= Canton of Caudebec-en-Caux =

Coordinates: 49°31′25″N 0°41′57″E

Caudebec-en-Caux
- Former canton
- Interactive map of Caudebec-en-Caux
- Country: France
- Region: Normandy
- Department: Seine-Maritime
- No. of communes: {{{nbcomm}}}
- Disbanded: 2015
- Area: 213.47 km^{2} (82.42 sq mi)
- Population (2012): 14,128
  - Density: 66.183/km^{2} (171.41/sq mi)

The Canton of Caudebec-en-Caux is a former canton situated in the Seine-Maritime département and in the Haute-Normandie region of northern France. It was disbanded following the French canton reorganisation which came into effect in March 2015. It consisted of 16 communes, which joined the canton of Notre-Dame-de-Gravenchon in 2015. It had a total of 14,128 inhabitants (2012).

== Geography ==
An area of farming, forestry and light industry in the arrondissement of Rouen, centred on the small town of Caudebec-en-Caux. The altitude varies from 0m (Heurteauville) to 154m (Saint-Aubin-de-Crétot) with an average altitude of 43m.

The canton comprised 16 communes:

- Anquetierville
- Caudebec-en-Caux
- Heurteauville
- Louvetot
- La Mailleraye-sur-Seine
- Maulévrier-Sainte-Gertrude
- Notre-Dame-de-Bliquetuit
- Saint-Arnoult
- Saint-Aubin-de-Crétot
- Saint-Gilles-de-Crétot
- Saint-Nicolas-de-Bliquetuit
- Saint-Nicolas-de-la-Haie
- Saint-Wandrille-Rançon
- Touffreville-la-Cable
- Vatteville-la-Rue
- Villequier

== Population ==
Historical population Canton of Caudebec-en-Caux
Year	1962	1968	1975	1982	1990	1999
Pop.	9,946	10,427	10,746	12,034	12,877	13,048
±%	—	+4.8%	+3.1%	+12.0%	+7.0%	+1.3%
From the year 1962 on: No double counting – residents of multiple communes (e.g. students and military personnel) are counted only once. Source: INSEE

== See also ==
- Arrondissements of the Seine-Maritime department
- Cantons of the Seine-Maritime department
- Communes of the Seine-Maritime department
