= Canton of Lillebonne =

Coordinates: 49°30′46″N 0°33′23″E

Lillebonne
- Former canton
- Interactive map of Lillebonne
- Country: France
- Region: Normandy
- Department: Seine-Maritime
- No. of communes: {{{nbcomm}}}
- Disbanded: 2015
- Area: 136.62 km^{2} (52.75 sq mi)
- Population (2012): 27,873
  - Density: 204.02/km^{2} (528.41/sq mi)

The Canton of Lillebonne is a former canton situated in the Seine-Maritime département and in the Haute-Normandie region of northern France. It was disbanded following the French canton reorganisation which came into effect in March 2015. It had a total of 27,873 inhabitants (2012).

== Geography ==
An area of farming, light industry and oil refineries in the arrondissement of Le Havre, centred on the town of Lillebonne. The altitude varies from 0m (Lillebonne) to 154m (Auberville-la-Campagne) with an average altitude of 69m.

The canton comprised 14 communes:

- Auberville-la-Campagne
- La Frénaye
- Grand-Camp
- Lillebonne
- Mélamare
- Norville
- Notre-Dame-de-Gravenchon
- Petiville
- Saint-Antoine-la-Forêt
- Saint-Jean-de-Folleville
- Saint-Maurice-d'Ételan
- Saint-Nicolas-de-la-Taille
- La Trinité-du-Mont
- Triquerville

== Population ==
Historical population Canton of Lillebonne
Year	1962	1968	1975	1982	1990	1999
Pop.	18,378	21,521	25,349	26,501	27,276	27,596
±%	—	+17.1%	+17.8%	+4.5%	+2.9%	+1.2%
From the year 1962 on: No double counting – residents of multiple communes (e.g. students and military personnel) are counted only once. Source: INSEE

== See also ==
- Arrondissements of the Seine-Maritime department
- Cantons of the Seine-Maritime department
- Communes of the Seine-Maritime department
