= Touffreville-la-Cable =

- Part of Port-Jérôme-sur-Seine
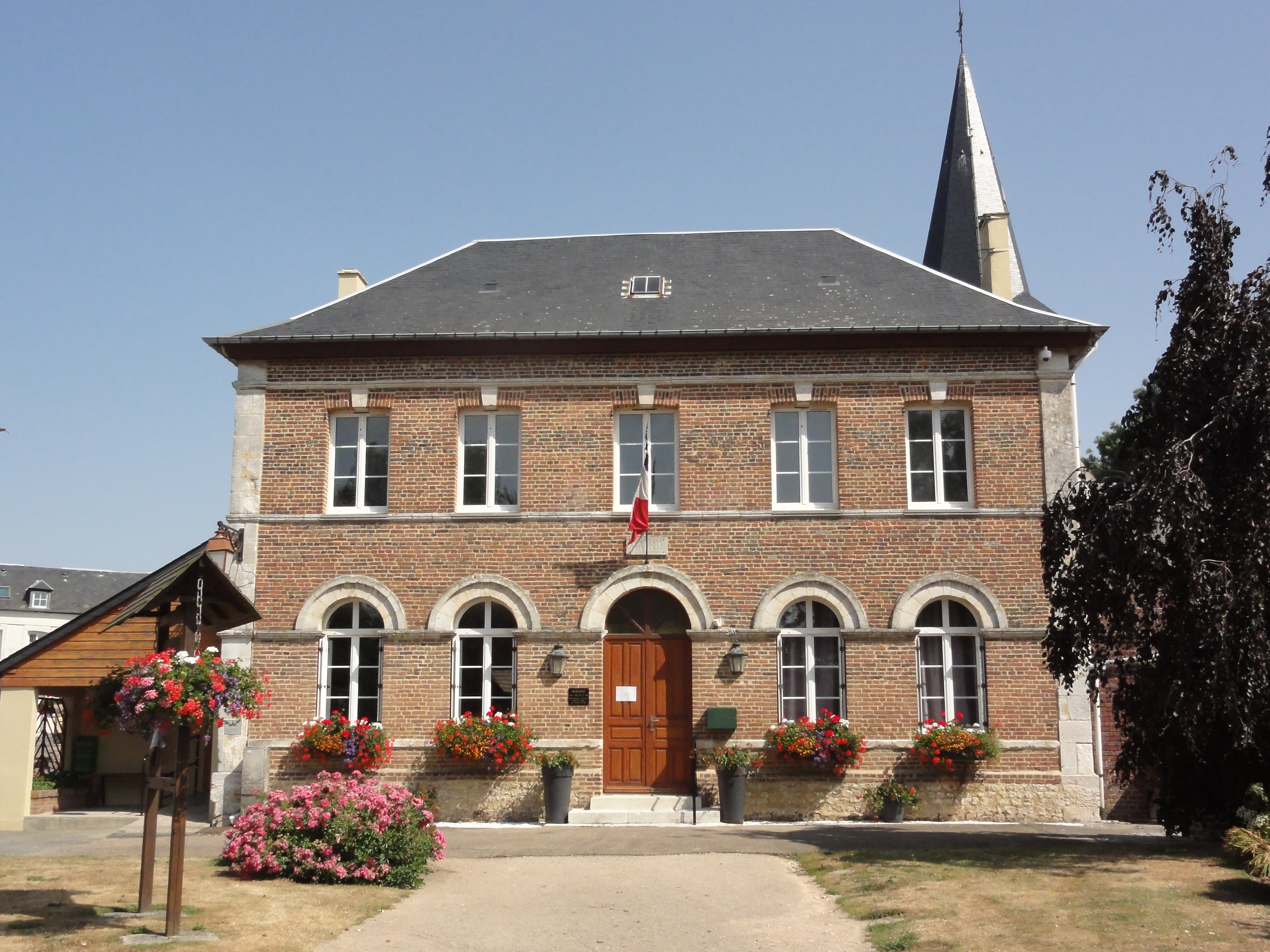
- Location of Touffreville-la-Cable
- Location within France Location within Normandy
- Coordinates: 49°31′21″N 0°37′08″E
- Country: France
- Region: Normandy
- Department: Seine-Maritime
- Arrondissement: Le Havre
- Canton: Notre-Dame-de-Gravenchon
- Commune: Port-Jérôme-sur-Seine
- Area^{1}: 3.97 km^{2} (1.53 sq mi)
- Elevation: 145 m (476 ft)
- Highest elevation: 149 m (489 ft)
- Lowest elevation: 65 m (213 ft)
- Population (2022): 453
  - Density: 114/km^{2} (296/sq mi)
- Time zone: UTC+01:00 (CET)
  - Summer (DST): UTC+02:00 (CEST)
- Postal code: 76170
- ^{1} French Land Register data, which excludes lakes, ponds, glaciers > 1 km^{2} (0.386 sq mi or 247 acres) and river estuaries.

Touffreville-la-Cable (French pronunciation: [tufʁəvil la kabl]) is a former commune in the Seine-Maritime department in the Normandy region in northern France. On 1 January 2016, it was merged into the new commune of Port-Jérôme-sur-Seine.

== Geography ==
A farming village situated in the Pays de Caux, some 25 miles (40 km) west of Rouen at the junction of the D28 and the D982 roads.

== Heraldry ==
Arms of Touffreville-la-Cable	The arms of Touffreville-la-Cable are blazoned : Or, on a saltire gules between in pale 2 mullets of 5 azure, and in fess 2 roosters gules, the dexter one contourny, 4 mallets argent at the extremities of the saltire.

== Population ==
Historical population
Year	Pop.	±% p.a.
1962	125	—
1968	130	+0.66%
1975	188	+5.41%
1982	269	+5.25%
1990	335	+2.78%
1999	354	+0.61%
2022	453	+1.08%
Source: EHESS and INSEE

== Places of interest ==
- The church of St. Ouen and St. Madeleine, dating from the thirteenth century.

== See also ==
- Communes of the Seine-Maritime department
