= Triquerville =

- Part of Port-Jérôme-sur-Seine
- Location of Triquerville
- Location within France Location within Normandy
- Coordinates: 49°30′16″N 0°37′43″E
- Country: France
- Region: Normandy
- Department: Seine-Maritime
- Arrondissement: Le Havre
- Canton: Notre-Dame-de-Gravenchon
- Commune: Port-Jérôme-sur-Seine
- Area^{1}: 3.01 km^{2} (1.16 sq mi)
- Elevation: 125 m (410 ft)
- Highest elevation: 143 m (469 ft)
- Lowest elevation: 90 m (300 ft)
- Population (2023): 408
  - Density: 136/km^{2} (351/sq mi)
- Time zone: UTC+01:00 (CET)
  - Summer (DST): UTC+02:00 (CEST)
- Postal code: 76170
- ^{1} French Land Register data, which excludes lakes, ponds, glaciers > 1 km^{2} (0.386 sq mi or 247 acres) and river estuaries.

Triquerville (French pronunciation: [tʁikɛʁvil]) is a former commune in the Seine-Maritime department in the Normandy region in northern France. On 1 January 2016, it was merged into the new commune of Port-Jérôme-sur-Seine.

== Geography ==
A farming village in the Pays de Caux, situated some 25 miles (40 km) east of Le Havre, on the D28 road.

== Places of interest ==
- The church dating from the nineteenth century.
- The seventeenth-century chateau.

== See also ==
- Communes of the Seine-Maritime department
