= Alvimare =

- Commune
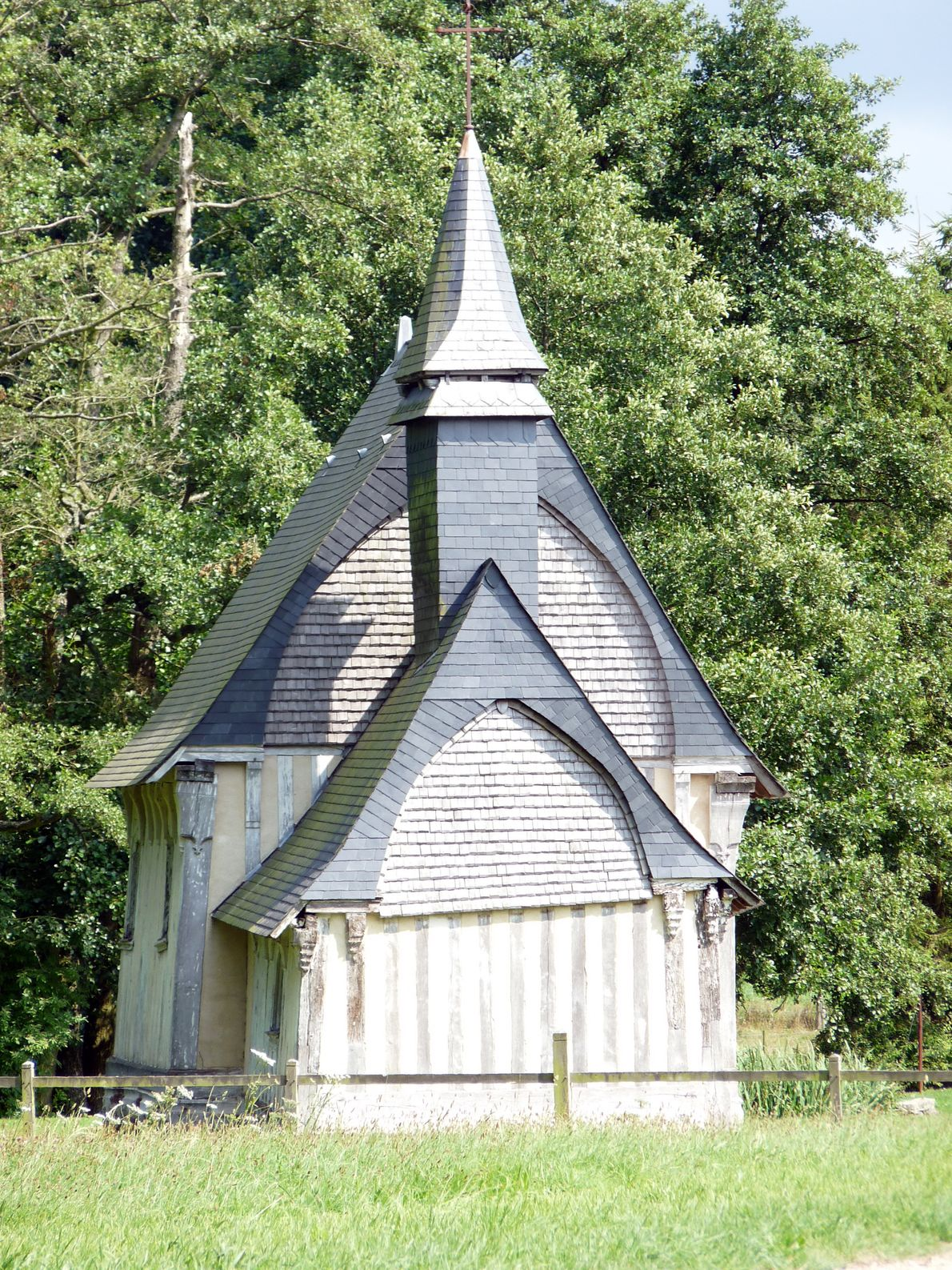
- The Chapelle des Blanques
- Location of Alvimare
- Location within France Location within Normandy
- Coordinates: 49°36′23″N 0°37′57″E
- Country: France
- Region: Normandy
- Department: Seine-Maritime
- Arrondissement: Le Havre
- Canton: Saint-Valery-en-Caux
- Intercommunality: Caux Seine Agglo

Government
  - Mayor (2026–32): Sylvain Truptil
- Area^{1}: 6.73 km^{2} (2.60 sq mi)
- Elevation: 140 m (460 ft)
- Highest elevation: 153 m (502 ft)
- Lowest elevation: 129 m (423 ft)
- Population (2023): 584
  - Density: 86.8/km^{2} (225/sq mi)
- Time zone: UTC+01:00 (CET)
  - Summer (DST): UTC+02:00 (CEST)
- INSEE/Postal code: 76002 /76640
- ^{1} French Land Register data, which excludes lakes, ponds, glaciers > 1 km^{2} (0.386 sq mi or 247 acres) and river estuaries.

Alvimare (French pronunciation: [alvimaʁ]) is a commune in the Seine-Maritime department in the Normandy region in northern France.

== Geography ==
A farming village situated some 23 miles (37 km) east of Le Havre, at the junction of the N15 and the D104.

== Population ==
Historical population
Year	Pop.	±% p.a.
1968	330	—
1975	294	−1.64%
1982	360	+2.94%
1990	486	+3.82%
1999	462	−0.56%
2007	501	+1.02%
2012	601	+3.71%
2017	615	+0.46%
2023	584	−0.86%
Source: INSEE

== Places of interest ==
- The wooden chapel dating from the sixteenth century.
- A sixteenth-century manorhouse
- The church of Notre-Dame, dating from the nineteenth century
- A fifteenth-century stone cross.

== See also ==
- Communes of the Seine-Maritime department
