= Notre-Dame-de-Gravenchon =

- Part of Port-Jérôme-sur-Seine
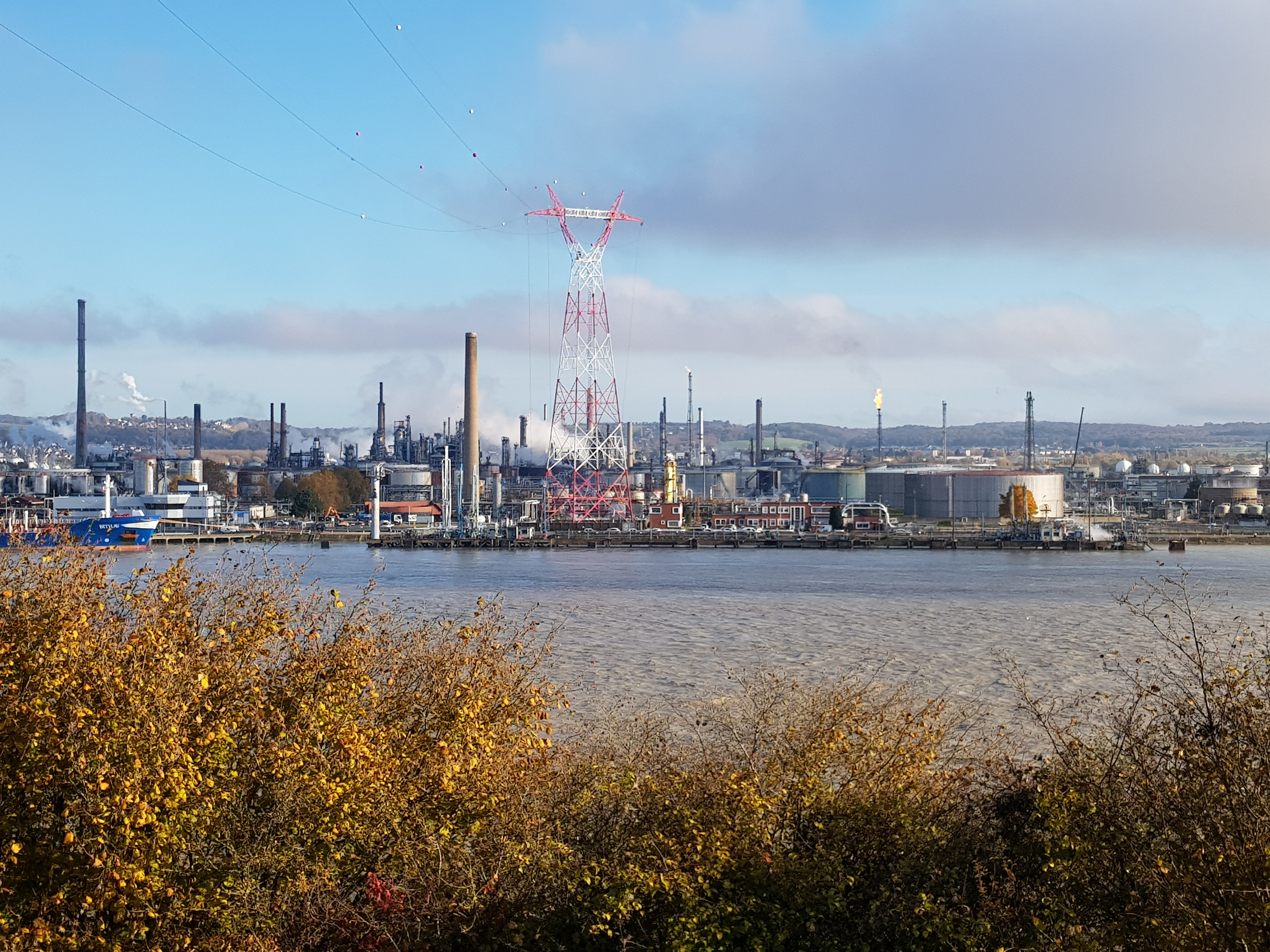
- Port-Jérôme-Gravenchon Refinery on the bank of the Seine
- Location of Notre-Dame-de-Gravenchon
- Location within France Location within Normandy
- Coordinates: 49°29′24″N 0°34′19″E
- Country: France
- Region: Normandy
- Department: Seine-Maritime
- Arrondissement: Le Havre
- Canton: Notre-Dame-de-Gravenchon
- Commune: Port-Jérôme-sur-Seine
- Area^{1}: 18.74 km^{2} (7.24 sq mi)
- Elevation: 35 m (115 ft)
- Highest elevation: 138 m (453 ft)
- Lowest elevation: 0 m (0 ft)
- Population (2022): 8,892
  - Density: 474.5/km^{2} (1,229/sq mi)
- Time zone: UTC+01:00 (CET)
  - Summer (DST): UTC+02:00 (CEST)
- Postal code: 76330
- ^{1} French Land Register data, which excludes lakes, ponds, glaciers > 1 km^{2} (0.386 sq mi or 247 acres) and river estuaries.

Notre-Dame-de-Gravenchon (French pronunciation: [nɔtʁə dam də ɡʁavɑ̃ʃɔ̃]) is a former commune in the Seine-Maritime department in the Normandy region in northern France. On 1 January 2016, it was merged into the new commune of Port-Jérôme-sur-Seine.

== Geography ==
A small town with a huge industrial area (Port-Jérome) to the southwest with farming and woodland to the north and east, in the Pays de Caux, situated by the banks of the river Seine, some 20 miles (32 km) east of Le Havre, at the junction of the D81, D373 and D110 roads.

== History ==
- The parishes of Saint-Georges-de-Gravenchon and Notre Dame were part of the royal domain of Lillebonne. The Counts of Évreux built the medieval castle of Fontaine-Saint-Denis. The two parishes were joined as one commune in 1823 under the name of Notre-Dame-de-Gravenchon.
- Napoleon III opened the new industrial area of Port-Jérôme. A commemorative stone recalls his visit on May 28, 1861. Until then, the commune was an agricultural town.
- In 1930, two oil refineries with two separate housing districts were established. "Standard" (for Esso employees) and "Vacuum" (for Mobil Oil's workers).
- During World War II, the refineries were partly destroyed (1940) but rebuilt after 1945. Notre Dame de Gravenchon was occupied by the Germans on 12 June 1940 and liberated on 31 August 1944 jointly by the British and Belgian armies (Brigade Piron).

=== Heraldry ===
Arms of Notre-Dame-de-Gravenchon	The arms of Notre-Dame-de-Gravenchon are blazoned : Per fess 1: per pale A: gules, a demi-lion issuant from the per pale line and B: Azure, the outline of a drakkar on waves argent; and 2: Vert, 2 stalks of wheat in saltire argent and in chief 3 chemical flasks outlined, and half full argent, middle one largest; all the lines of division fimbriated.

== Population ==
Historical population
Year	Pop.	±% p.a.
1962	5,488	—
1968	6,273	+2.25%
1975	8,335	+4.14%
1982	8,963	+1.04%
1990	8,901	−0.09%
1999	8,618	−0.36%
2013	8,138	−0.41%
2022	8,892	+0.99%
Source: EHESS and INSEE

== Economy ==
Notre-Dame-de-Gravenchon features a large industrial complex centered around the Seine river. The industrial area is dominated by Port-Jérôme-Gravenchon Refinery run by Esso.

== Places of interest ==
- The church of Notre-Dame, dating from the twelfth century.
- The church of St. Georges, dating from the twentieth century.
- A seventeenth century public washhouse.
- Vestiges of the medieval castle and chapel at La Fontaine-Saint-Denis.

== Twinning ==
Notre Dame de Gravenchon is twinned with Street, a village in Somerset, a county in the south west of England and Isny im Allgäu, a city in the South of Baden-Württemberg, Germany and also Rubano in Northern Italy.

== See also ==
- Communes of the Seine-Maritime department
