= Lintot =

- Commune
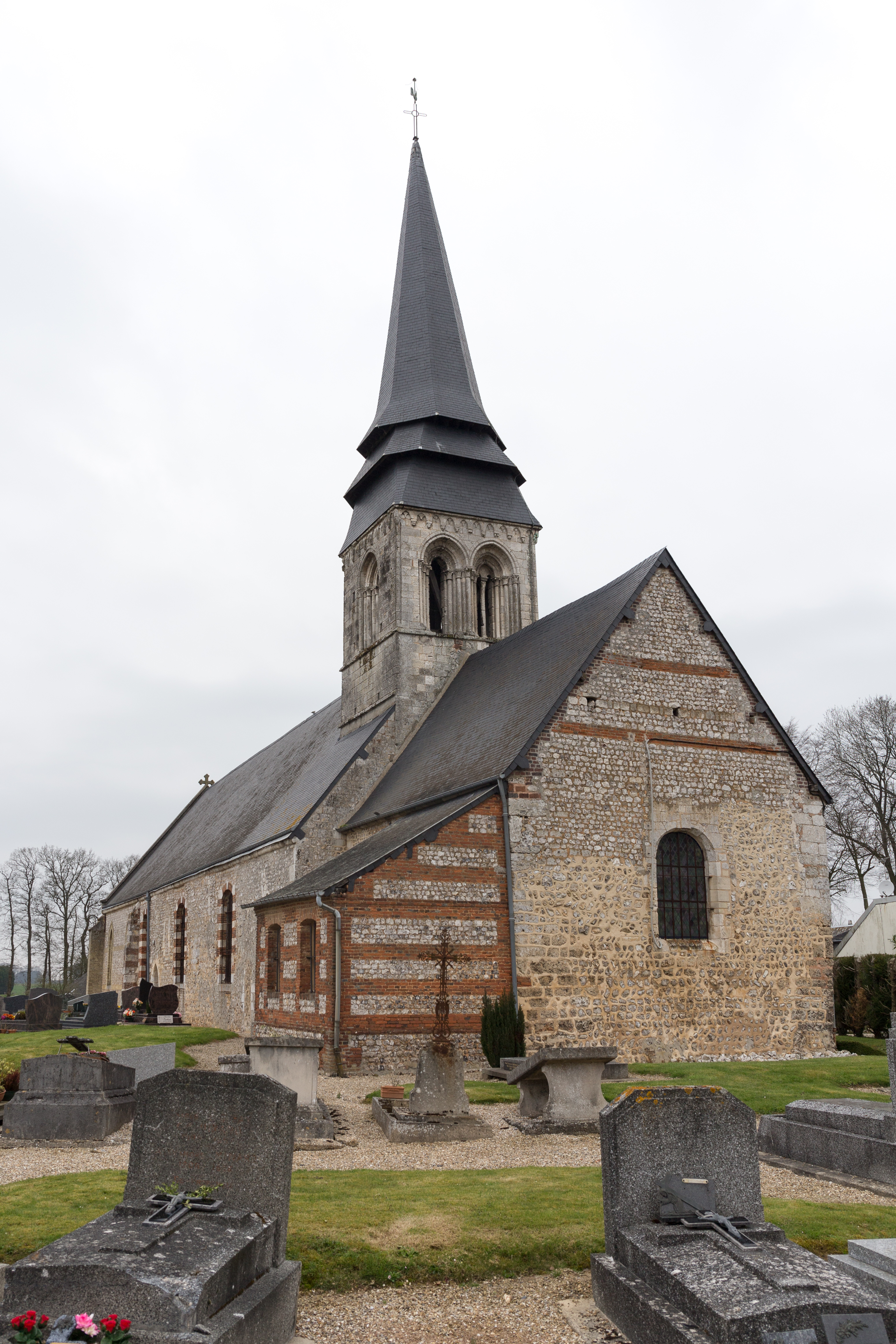
- Saint-Samson church

- Coat of arms
- Location of Lintot
- Location within France Location within Normandy
- Coordinates: 49°33′50″N 0°34′09″E
- Country: France
- Region: Normandy
- Department: Seine-Maritime
- Arrondissement: Le Havre
- Canton: Port-Jérôme-sur-Seine
- Intercommunality: Caux Seine Agglo

Government
  - Mayor (2026–32): Dominique Morand
- Area^{1}: 8 km^{2} (3.1 sq mi)
- Elevation: 150 m (490 ft)
- Highest elevation: 154 m (505 ft)
- Lowest elevation: 50 m (160 ft)
- Population (2023): 472
  - Density: 59/km^{2} (150/sq mi)
- Time zone: UTC+01:00 (CET)
  - Summer (DST): UTC+02:00 (CEST)
- INSEE/Postal code: 76388 /76210
- ^{1} French Land Register data, which excludes lakes, ponds, glaciers > 1 km^{2} (0.386 sq mi or 247 acres) and river estuaries.

Lintot (French pronunciation: [lɛ̃to]) is a commune in the Seine-Maritime department in the Normandy region in northern France.

== Geography ==
A farming village in the Pays de Caux, some 21 miles (34 km) east of Le Havre, at the junction of the D30 and D34 roads.

== Heraldry ==
Arms of Lintot	The arms of Lintot are blazoned : Argent, on a chevron azure between 2 leopards gules and an eagle azure, a martlet Or.

== Population ==
Historical population
Year	Pop.	±% p.a.
1968	288	—
1975	390	+4.43%
1982	442	+1.80%
1990	451	+0.25%
1999	413	−0.97%
2007	459	+1.33%
2012	453	−0.26%
2017	449	−0.18%
2023	472	+0.84%
Source: INSEE

== Places of interest ==
- The church of St.Samson, dating from the twelfth century.
- The sixteenth-century château.

== See also ==
- Communes of the Seine-Maritime department
