= Trouville-Alliquerville =

- Commune
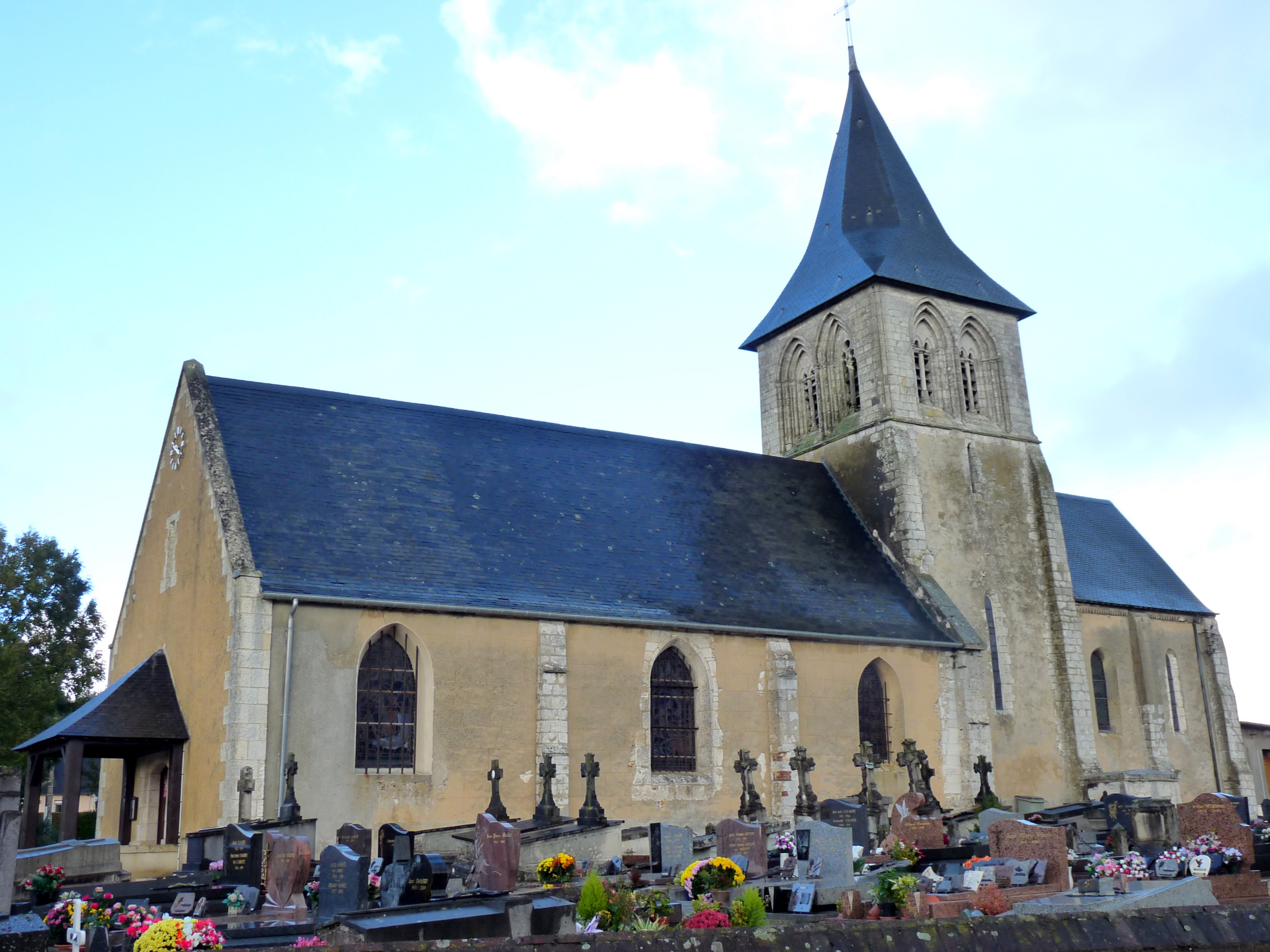
- The church in Trouville

- Coat of arms
- Location of Trouville-Alliquerville
- Location within France Location within Normandy
- Coordinates: 49°34′28″N 0°36′05″E
- Country: France
- Region: Normandy
- Department: Seine-Maritime
- Arrondissement: Le Havre
- Canton: Port-Jérôme-sur-Seine
- Intercommunality: Caux Seine Agglo

Government
  - Mayor (2026–32): Christian Paris
- Area^{1}: 10.38 km^{2} (4.01 sq mi)
- Elevation: 135 m (443 ft)
- Highest elevation: 154 m (505 ft)
- Lowest elevation: 135 m (443 ft)
- Population (2023): 608
  - Density: 58.6/km^{2} (152/sq mi)
- Time zone: UTC+01:00 (CET)
  - Summer (DST): UTC+02:00 (CEST)
- INSEE/Postal code: 76715 /76210
- ^{1} French Land Register data, which excludes lakes, ponds, glaciers > 1 km^{2} (0.386 sq mi or 247 acres) and river estuaries.

Trouville-Alliquerville (before 2026: Trouville, French pronunciation: [tʁuvil]) is a commune in the Seine-Maritime department in the Normandy region in northern France.

== Geography ==
The commune mainly consists of a farming village situated some 22 miles (35 km) northeast of Le Havre, at the junction of the D28, D34 and the D40.

== Heraldry ==
Arms of Trouville	The arms of the commune of Trouville are blazoned : Gules, a fan of 5 stalks of wheat Or, on a chief azure 3 mullets [of 5] Or.

== Population ==
Historical population
Year	Pop.	±% p.a.
1968	404	—
1975	415	+0.38%
1982	501	+2.73%
1990	537	+0.87%
1999	563	+0.53%
2007	597	+0.74%
2012	633	+1.18%
2017	632	−0.03%
2023	608	−0.64%
Source: INSEE

== Places of interest ==
- The church of St. Pierre, dating from the sixteenth century.
- A fifteenth-century manorhouse
- The church of Notre-Dame, dating from the thirteenth century
- A seventeenth-century stone cross in the cemetery.

== See also ==
- Communes of the Seine-Maritime department
