= Bolleville, Seine-Maritime =

Bolleville
- Commune
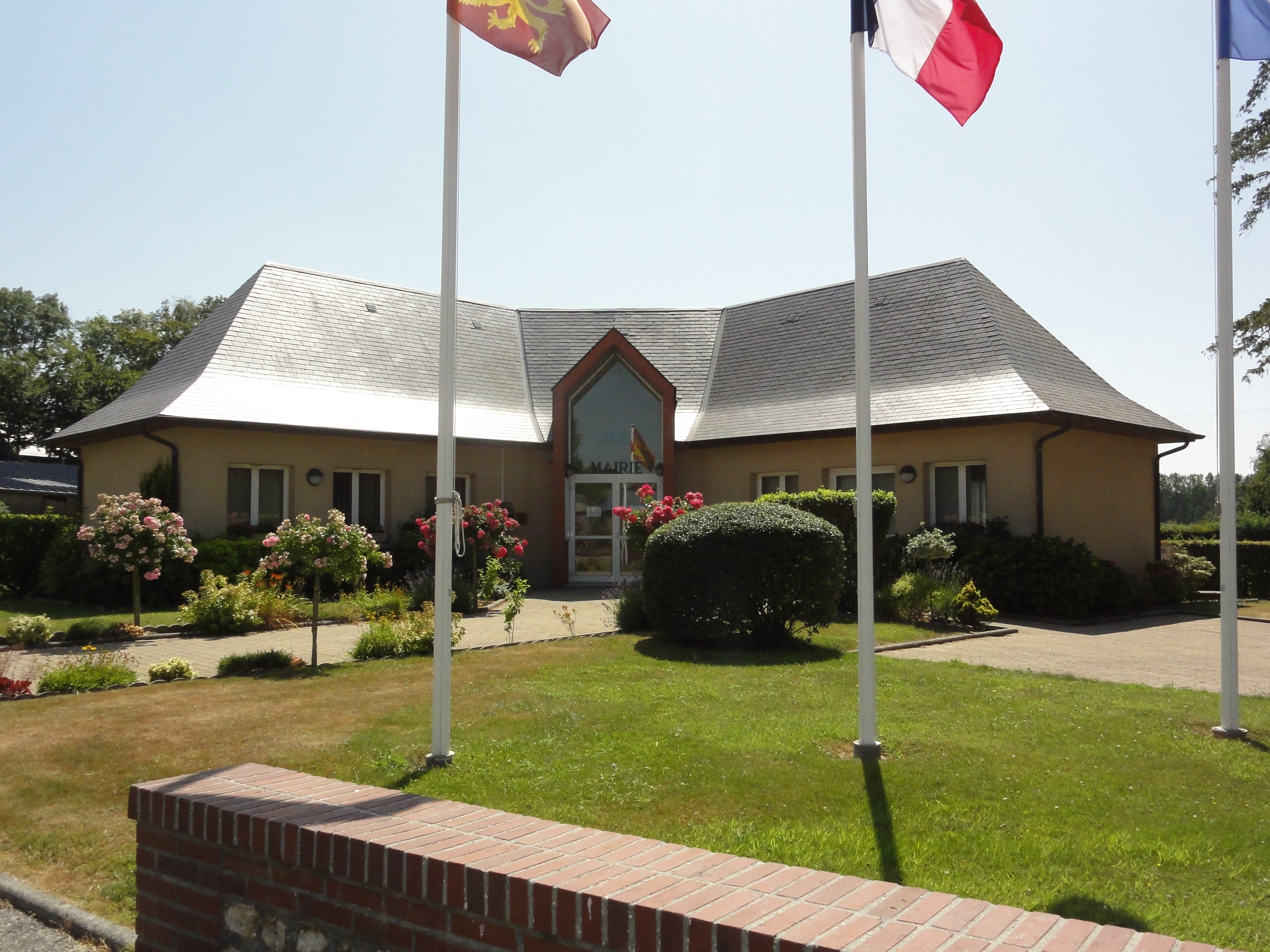
- Bolleville Town hall
- Location of Bolleville
- Location within France Location within Normandy
- Coordinates: 49°36′00″N 0°33′57″E
- Country: France
- Region: Normandy
- Department: Seine-Maritime
- Arrondissement: Le Havre
- Canton: Port-Jérôme-sur-Seine
- Intercommunality: Caux Seine Agglo

Government
  - Mayor (2020–2026): Chantal Lelievre
- Area^{1}: 9.73 km^{2} (3.76 sq mi)
- Elevation: 141 m (463 ft)
- Highest elevation: 153 m (502 ft)
- Lowest elevation: 128 m (420 ft)
- Population (2023): 596
  - Density: 61.3/km^{2} (159/sq mi)
- Time zone: UTC+01:00 (CET)
  - Summer (DST): UTC+02:00 (CEST)
- INSEE/Postal code: 76115 /76210
- ^{1} French Land Register data, which excludes lakes, ponds, glaciers > 1 km^{2} (0.386 sq mi or 247 acres) and river estuaries.

Bolleville (French pronunciation: [bɔlvil]) is a commune in the Seine-Maritime department in the Normandy region in northern France.

== Geography ==
A farming village situated in the Pays de Caux, some 22 miles (35 km) northeast of Le Havre, served by the D28, D109 and D6015 roads. The A29 autoroute passes by on the northern border of the village.

== Population ==
Historical population
Year	Pop.	±% p.a.
1968	408	—
1975	412	+0.14%
1982	447	+1.17%
1990	504	+1.51%
1999	506	+0.04%
2007	527	+0.51%
2012	592	+2.35%
2017	580	−0.41%
2023	596	+0.45%
Source: INSEE

== Places of interest ==
- The church of St.Pierre and St.Paul, dating from the thirteenth century.
- Two seventeenth century châteaux, at Beaunay and Calménil

== See also ==
- Communes of the Seine-Maritime department
