= Auberville-la-Campagne =

- Part of Port-Jérôme-sur-Seine
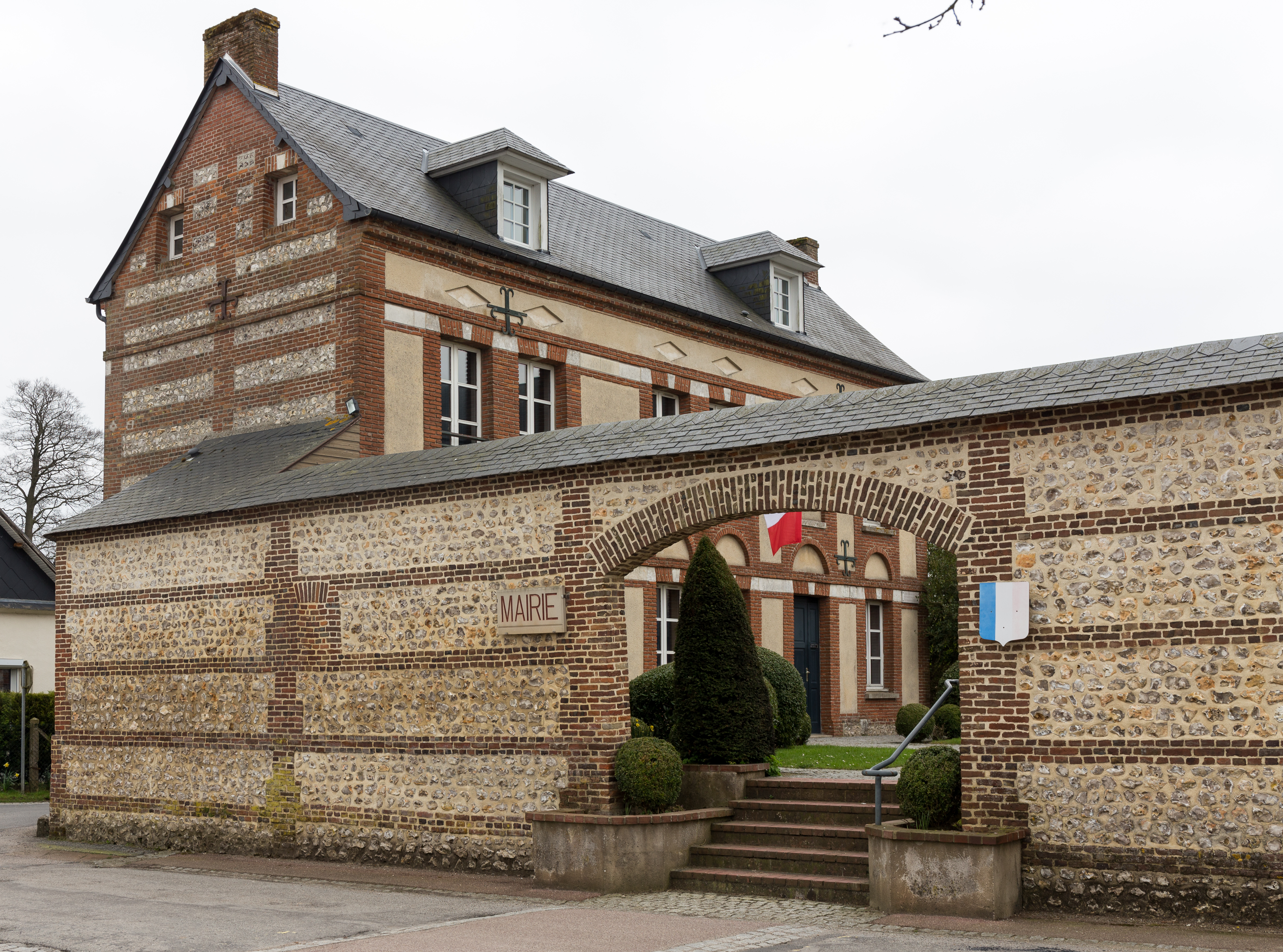
- The town hall
- Location of Auberville-la-Campagne
- Location within France Location within Normandy
- Coordinates: 49°32′02″N 0°36′06″E
- Country: France
- Region: Normandy
- Department: Seine-Maritime
- Arrondissement: Le Havre
- Canton: Notre-Dame-de-Gravenchon
- Commune: Port-Jérôme-sur-Seine
- Area^{1}: 4.78 km^{2} (1.85 sq mi)
- Elevation: 100 m (330 ft)
- Highest elevation: 154 m (505 ft)
- Lowest elevation: 103 m (338 ft)
- Population (2023): 672
  - Density: 141/km^{2} (364/sq mi)
- Time zone: UTC+01:00 (CET)
  - Summer (DST): UTC+02:00 (CEST)
- Postal code: 76170
- ^{1} French Land Register data, which excludes lakes, ponds, glaciers > 1 km^{2} (0.386 sq mi or 247 acres) and river estuaries.

Auberville-la-Campagne (French pronunciation: [obɛʁvil la kɑ̃paɲ]) is a former commune in the Seine-Maritime department in the Normandy region in northern France. On 1 January 2016, it was merged into the new commune of Port-Jérôme-sur-Seine.

== Geography ==
A farming village situated in the Pays de Caux, some 20 miles (32 km) east of Le Havre, at the junction of the D110 and the D982.

== Places of interest ==
- The church of St.Jean-Baptiste, dating from the thirteenth century.
- Ruins of a medieval castle donjon.
- The Château du Carouge.

== See also ==
- Communes of the Seine-Maritime department
