= Foucart =

- Commune
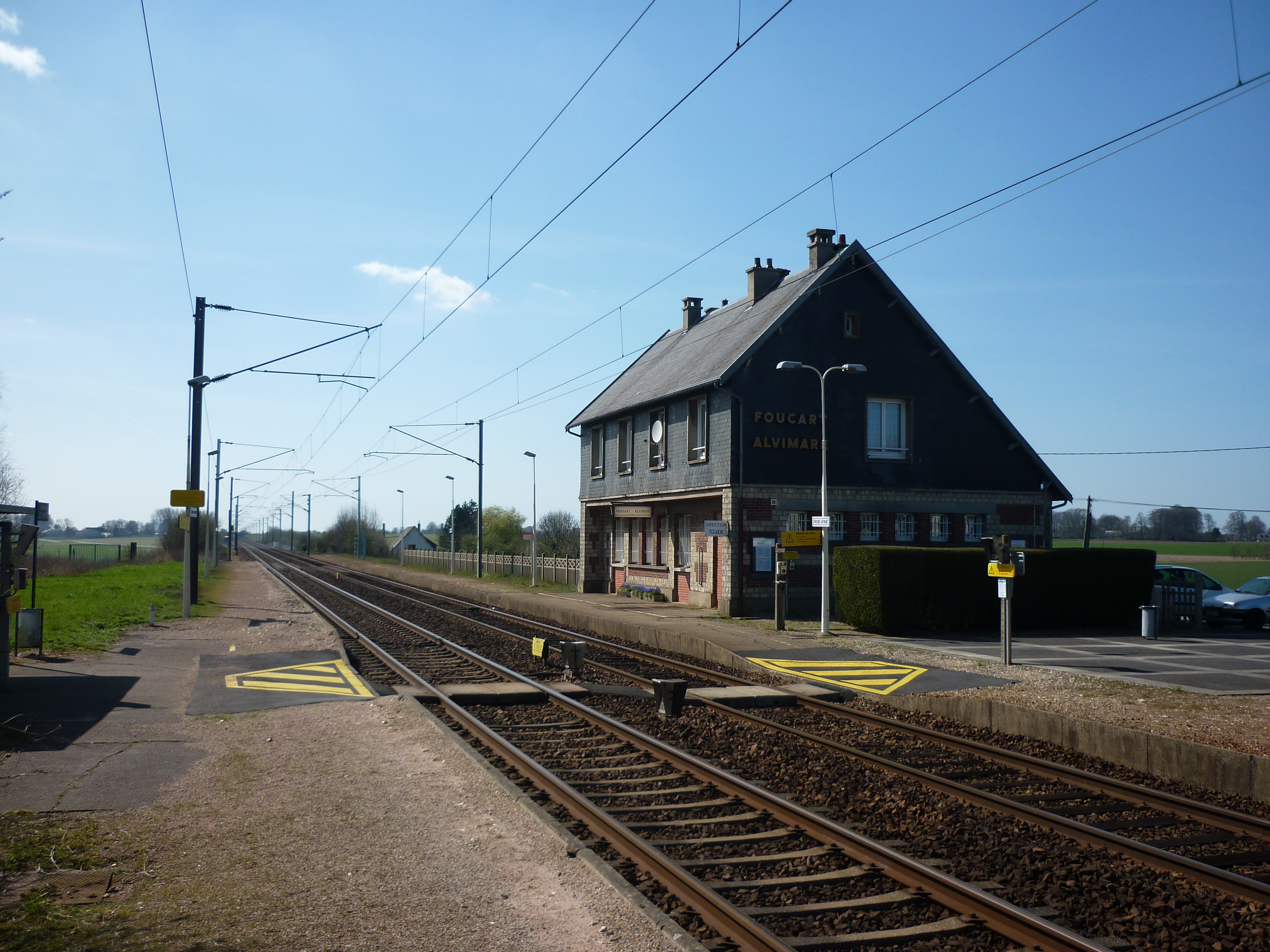
- The railway station in Foucart
- Location of Foucart
- Location within France Location within Normandy
- Coordinates: 49°36′52″N 0°35′46″E
- Country: France
- Region: Normandy
- Department: Seine-Maritime
- Arrondissement: Le Havre
- Canton: Saint-Valery-en-Caux
- Intercommunality: Caux Seine Agglo

Government
  - Mayor (2020–2026): Antoine Servain
- Area^{1}: 4.28 km^{2} (1.65 sq mi)
- Elevation: 140 m (460 ft)
- Highest elevation: 149 m (489 ft)
- Lowest elevation: 128 m (420 ft)
- Population (2023): 329
  - Density: 76.9/km^{2} (199/sq mi)
- Time zone: UTC+01:00 (CET)
  - Summer (DST): UTC+02:00 (CEST)
- INSEE/Postal code: 76279 /76640
- ^{1} French Land Register data, which excludes lakes, ponds, glaciers > 1 km^{2} (0.386 sq mi or 247 acres) and river estuaries.

Foucart (French pronunciation: [fukaʁ]) is a commune in the Seine-Maritime department in the Normandy region in northern France.

== Geography ==
A farming village situated in the Pays de Caux, some 21 miles (34 km) northeast of Le Havre, at the junction of the D40, D104 and D29 roads. The A29 autoroute pass through the northern sector of the commune.

== Population ==
Historical population
Year	Pop.	±% p.a.
1968	264	—
1975	273	+0.48%
1982	301	+1.40%
1990	306	+0.21%
1999	318	+0.43%
2007	356	+1.42%
2012	352	−0.23%
2017	354	+0.11%
2023	329	−1.21%
Source: INSEE

== Places of interest ==
- The church of St.Martin, dating from the sixteenth century.

== See also ==
- Communes of the Seine-Maritime department
