= Caux Seine Agglo =

Coordinates: 49.5167°N 0.5500°E

- Communauté d'agglomération
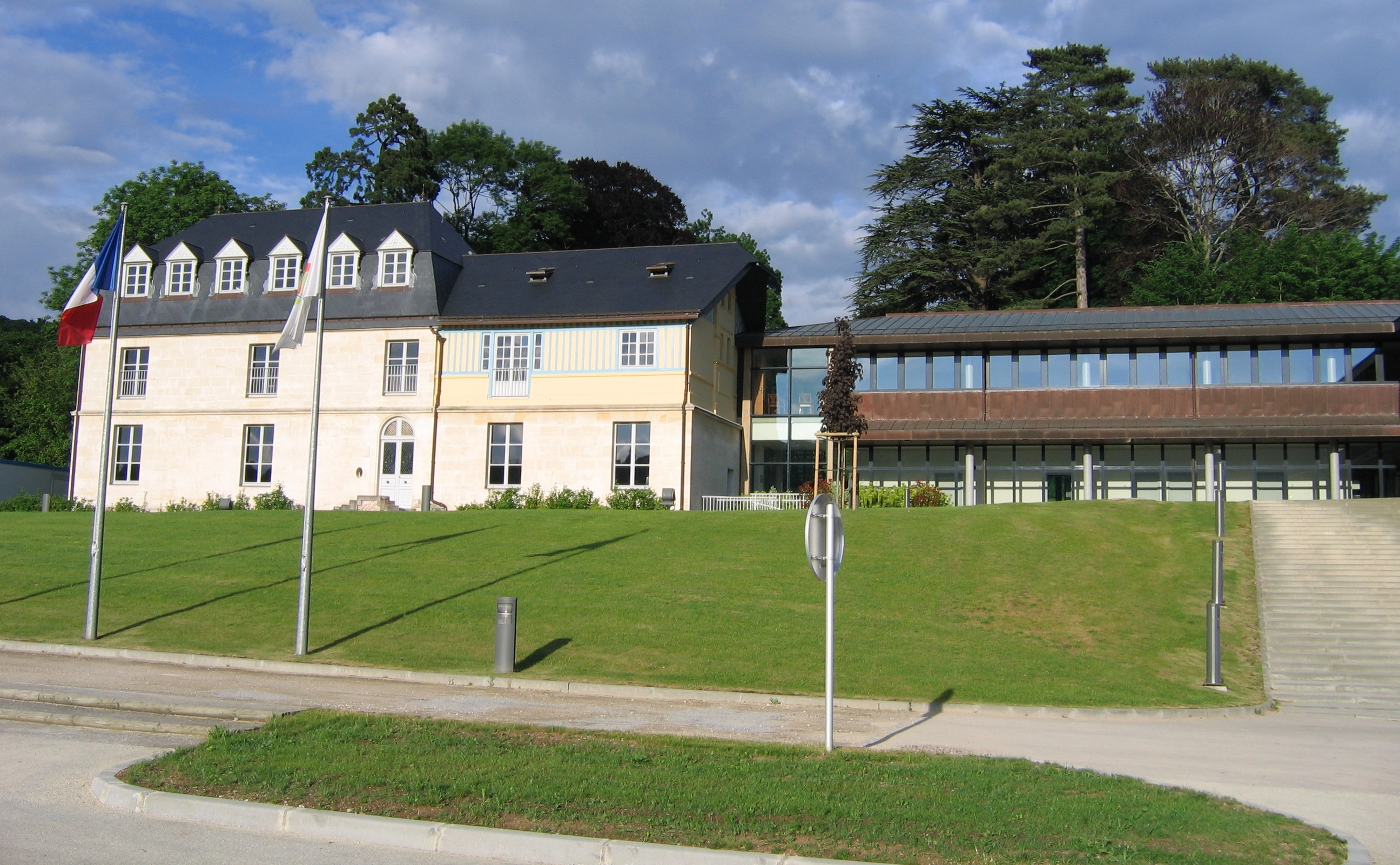
- Country: France
- Region: Normandy
- Department: Seine-Maritime
- No. of communes: {{{nbcomm}}}
- Established: 1 January 2008

Government
  - President (2020–2026): Virginie Lutrot
- Area: 574.27 km^{2} (221.73 sq mi)
- Population (2018): 77,906
  - Density: 135.66/km^{2} (351.36/sq mi)
- Website: Official website

Caux Seine Agglo (before November 2017: Communauté d'agglomération Caux vallée de Seine) is a communauté d'agglomération in the Seine-Maritime department of the Normandy region of northern France. It was created as a communauté de communes on January 1, 2008. It is a communauté d'agglomération since January 2017. It evolved from an amalgamation of three earlier communautés de communes - Port-Jérôme, Caudebec-en-Caux and Canton of Bolbec. Its area is 574.3 km^{2}. Its population was 77,906 in 2018.

== Participants ==
Since 1 January 2017, the communauté comprises the following 50 communes (with their INSEE codes):

1. Alvimare (76002)
2. Anquetierville (76022)
3. Arelaune-en-Seine (76401)
4. Bernières (76082)
5. Beuzeville-la-Grenier (76090)
6. Beuzevillette (76092)
7. Bolbec (76114)
8. Bolleville (76115)
9. Cléville (76181)
10. Cliponville (76182)
11. Envronville (76236)
12. Foucart (76279)
13. La Frénaye (76281)
14. Grand-Camp (76318)
15. Gruchet-le-Valasse (76329)
16. Hattenville (76342)
17. Heurteauville (76362)
18. Lanquetot (76382)
19. Lillebonne (76384)
20. Lintot (76388)
21. Louvetot (76398)
22. Maulévrier-Sainte-Gertrude (76418)
23. Mélamare (76421)
24. Mirville (76439)
25. Nointot (76468)
26. Norville (76471)
27. Notre-Dame-de-Bliquetuit (76473)
28. Parc-d'Anxtot (76494)
29. Petiville (76499)
30. Port-Jérôme-sur-Seine (76476)
31. Raffetot (76518)
32. Rives-en-Seine (76164)
33. Rouville (76543)
34. Saint-Antoine-la-Forêt (76556)
35. Saint-Arnoult (76557)
36. Saint-Aubin-de-Crétot (76559)
37. Saint-Eustache-la-Forêt (76576)
38. Saint-Gilles-de-Crétot (76585)
39. Saint-Jean-de-Folleville (76592)
40. Saint-Jean-de-la-Neuville (76593)
41. Saint-Maurice-d'Ételan (76622)
42. Saint-Nicolas-de-la-Haie (76626)
43. Saint-Nicolas-de-la-Taille (76627)
44. Tancarville (76684)
45. Terres-de-Caux (76258)
46. Trémauville (76710)
47. La Trinité-du-Mont (76712)
48. Trouville-Alliquerville (76715)
49. Vatteville-la-Rue (76727)
50. Yébleron (76751)

== See also ==
- Communes of the Seine-Maritime department
