= Cléville, Seine-Maritime =

Cléville
- Commune
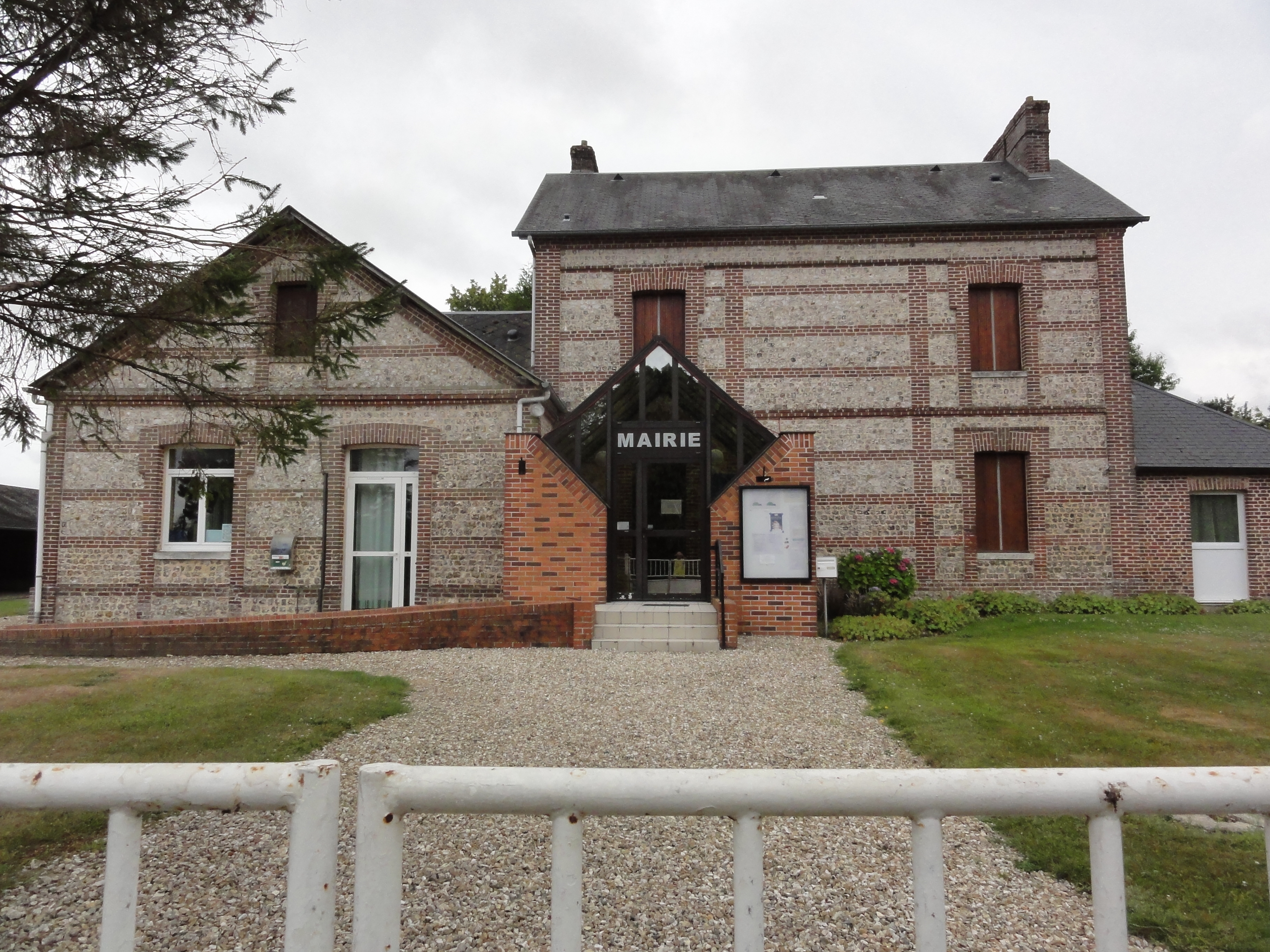
- Cléville Town hall
- Location of Cléville
- Location within France Location within Normandy
- Coordinates: 49°37′18″N 0°37′00″E
- Country: France
- Region: Normandy
- Department: Seine-Maritime
- Arrondissement: Le Havre
- Canton: Saint-Valery-en-Caux
- Intercommunality: Caux Seine Agglo

Government
  - Mayor (2026–32): Didier Duboc
- Area^{1}: 5.47 km^{2} (2.11 sq mi)
- Elevation: 126 m (413 ft)
- Highest elevation: 144 m (472 ft)
- Lowest elevation: 124 m (407 ft)
- Population (2023): 136
  - Density: 24.9/km^{2} (64.4/sq mi)
- Time zone: UTC+01:00 (CET)
  - Summer (DST): UTC+02:00 (CEST)
- INSEE/Postal code: 76181 /76640
- ^{1} French Land Register data, which excludes lakes, ponds, glaciers > 1 km^{2} (0.386 sq mi or 247 acres) and river estuaries.

Cléville (French pronunciation: [klevil]) is a commune in the Seine-Maritime department in the Normandy region in northern France.

== Geography ==
A small farming village situated in the Pays de Caux, some 22 miles (35 km) northeast of Le Havre, at the junction of the D29 and D228 roads. The A29 autoroute passes by the village in the northern part of the commune.

== Population ==
Historical population
Year	Pop.	±% p.a.
1968	141	—
1975	152	+1.08%
1982	156	+0.37%
1990	164	+0.63%
1999	169	+0.33%
2007	160	−0.68%
2012	162	+0.25%
2017	159	−0.37%
2023	136	−2.57%
Source: INSEE

== Places of interest ==
- The church of St. Benoit, dating from the eleventh century.
- Some thirteenth century walls of the old priory buildings.

== See also ==
- Communes of the Seine-Maritime department
