= Port-Jérôme-sur-Seine =

- Commune
- Location of Port-Jérôme-sur-Seine
- Location within France Location within Normandy
- Coordinates: 49°29′20″N 0°34′01″E
- Country: France
- Region: Normandy
- Department: Seine-Maritime
- Arrondissement: Le Havre
- Canton: Port-Jérôme-sur-Seine
- Intercommunality: Caux Seine Agglo

Government
  - Mayor (2026–32): Virginie Lutrot
- Area^{1}: 30.50 km^{2} (11.78 sq mi)
- Population (2023): 10,617
  - Density: 348.1/km^{2} (901.6/sq mi)
- Time zone: UTC+01:00 (CET)
  - Summer (DST): UTC+02:00 (CEST)
- INSEE/Postal code: 76476 /76330, 76170
- ^{1} French Land Register data, which excludes lakes, ponds, glaciers > 1 km^{2} (0.386 sq mi or 247 acres) and river estuaries.

Port-Jérôme-sur-Seine (French pronunciation: [pɔʁ ʒeʁom syʁ sɛn]) is a commune in the department of Seine-Maritime, northern France. The municipality was established on 1 January 2016 by merger of the former communes of Notre-Dame-de-Gravenchon, Auberville-la-Campagne, Touffreville-la-Cable and Triquerville.

== Population ==
Population data refer to the area corresponding with the commune as of January 2025.

Historical population
Year	Pop.	±% p.a.
1968	6,909	—
1975	9,051	+3.93%
1982	9,940	+1.35%
1990	10,117	+0.22%
1999	9,875	−0.27%
2007	9,639	−0.30%
2012	9,531	−0.23%
2017	10,030	+1.03%
2023	10,617	+0.95%
Source: INSEE

== See also ==
- Communes of the Seine-Maritime department
