= Saint-Gilles-de-Crétot =

- Commune
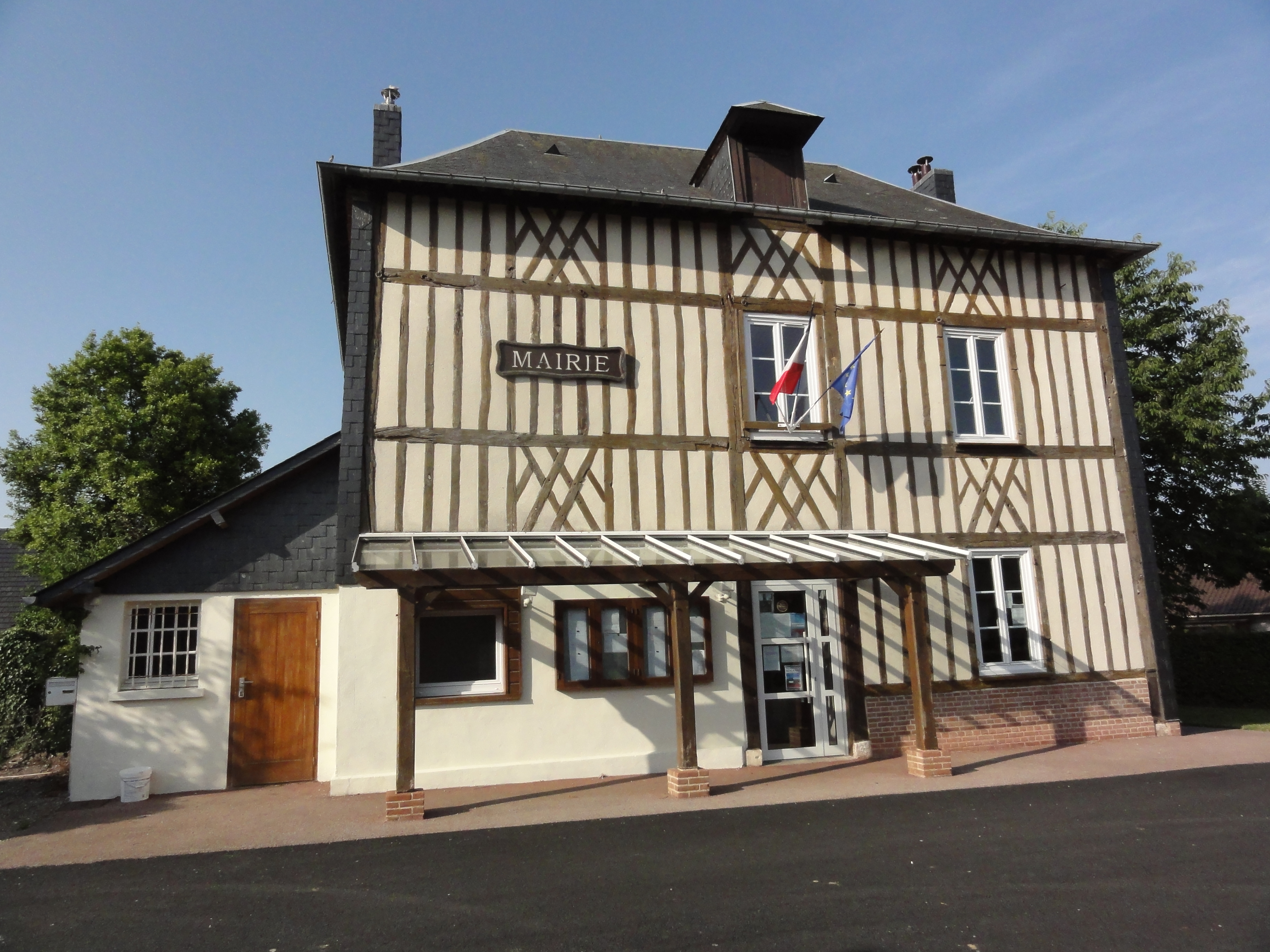
- Town hall

- Coat of arms
- Location of Saint-Gilles-de-Crétot
- Location within France Location within Normandy
- Coordinates: 49°33′33″N 0°38′43″E
- Country: France
- Region: Normandy
- Department: Seine-Maritime
- Arrondissement: Rouen
- Canton: Port-Jérôme-sur-Seine
- Intercommunality: Caux Seine Agglo

Government
  - Mayor (2026–32): Didier Bénard
- Area^{1}: 6.02 km^{2} (2.32 sq mi)
- Elevation: 135 m (443 ft)
- Highest elevation: 141 m (463 ft)
- Lowest elevation: 32 m (105 ft)
- Population (2023): 377
  - Density: 62.6/km^{2} (162/sq mi)
- Time zone: UTC+01:00 (CET)
  - Summer (DST): UTC+02:00 (CEST)
- INSEE/Postal code: 76585 /76490
- ^{1} French Land Register data, which excludes lakes, ponds, glaciers > 1 km^{2} (0.386 sq mi or 247 acres) and river estuaries.

Saint-Gilles-de-Crétot (French pronunciation: [sɛ̃ ʒil də kʁeto]) is a commune in the Seine-Maritime department in the Normandy region in northern France.

== Geography ==
A small farming village situated in the Pays de Caux, some 25 miles (40 km) northwest of Rouen near the junction of the D40 with the D440 road.

== Heraldry ==
Arms of Saint-Gilles-de-Crétot	The arms of Saint-Gilles-de-Crétot are blazoned : Azure, an armed senestrochere argent holding a lance palewise Or, from which a banner argent a bend wavy gules.

== Population ==
Historical population
Year	Pop.	±% p.a.
1968	188	—
1975	182	−0.46%
1982	194	+0.92%
1990	253	+3.37%
1999	268	+0.64%
2007	336	+2.87%
2012	437	+5.40%
2017	434	−0.14%
2023	377	−2.32%
Source: INSEE

== Places of interest ==
- The church of St. Gilles, dating from the sixteenth century.
- Two châteaux, de La Viézaire and de La Picottière.

== See also ==
- Communes of the Seine-Maritime department
