= Saint-Nicolas-de-la-Haie =

- Commune
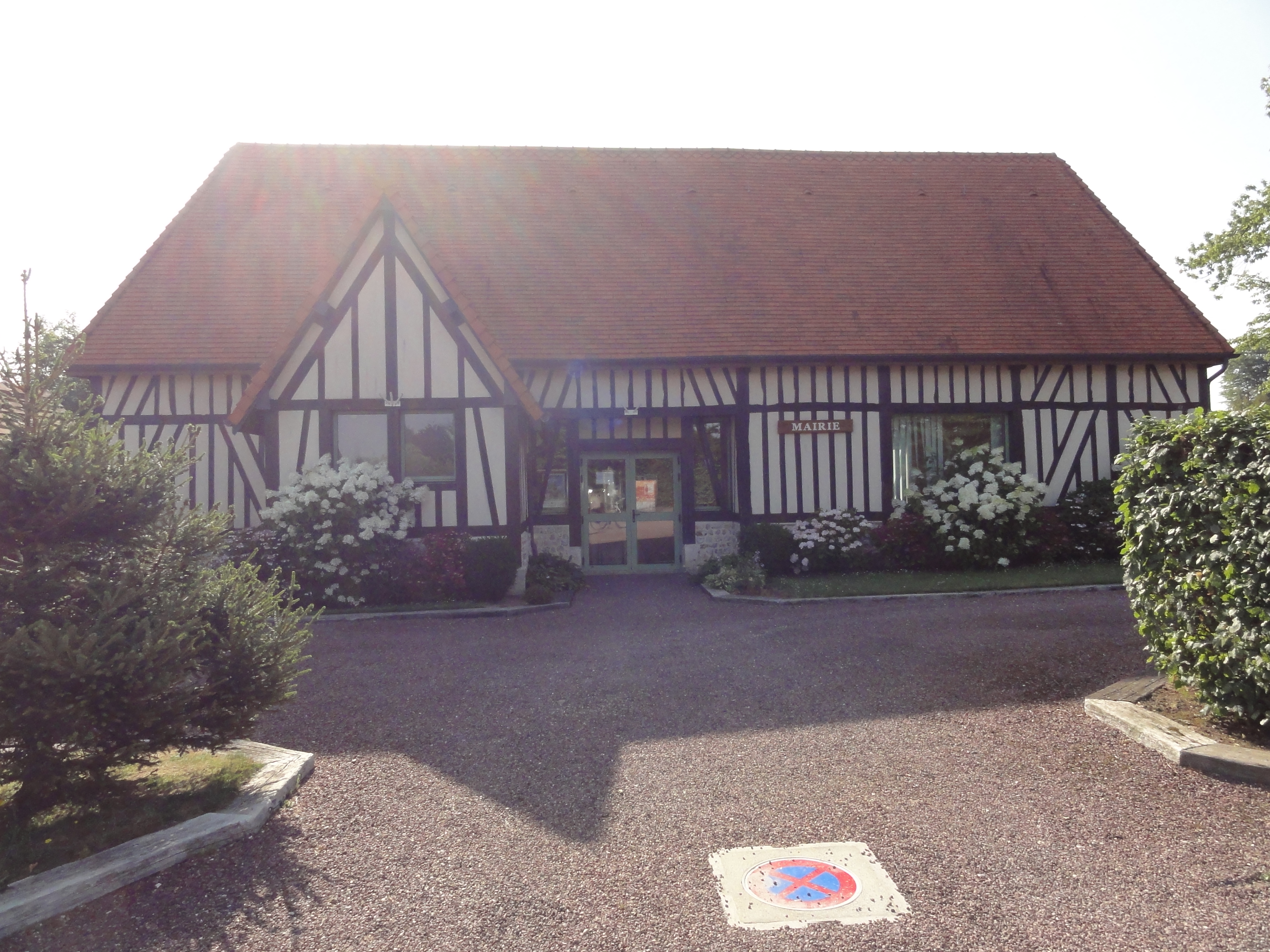
- Town hall

- Coat of arms
- Location of Saint-Nicolas-de-la-Haie
- Location within France Location within Normandy
- Coordinates: 49°33′25″N 0°37′26″E
- Country: France
- Region: Normandy
- Department: Seine-Maritime
- Arrondissement: Rouen
- Canton: Port-Jérôme-sur-Seine
- Intercommunality: Caux Seine Agglo

Government
  - Mayor (2026–32): Franck Isaac
- Area^{1}: 3.15 km^{2} (1.22 sq mi)
- Elevation: 120 m (390 ft)
- Highest elevation: 150 m (490 ft)
- Lowest elevation: 77 m (253 ft)
- Population (2023): 408
  - Density: 130/km^{2} (335/sq mi)
- Time zone: UTC+01:00 (CET)
  - Summer (DST): UTC+02:00 (CEST)
- INSEE/Postal code: 76626 /76490
- ^{1} French Land Register data, which excludes lakes, ponds, glaciers > 1 km^{2} (0.386 sq mi or 247 acres) and river estuaries.

Saint-Nicolas-de-la-Haie (French pronunciation: [sɛ̃ nikɔla də la ɛ]) is a commune in the Seine-Maritime department in the Normandy region in northern France.

== Geography ==
A farming village situated in the Pays de Caux, some 26 miles (42 km) northwest of Rouen on the D34 and the D30.

== Heraldry ==
Arms of Saint-Nicolas-de-la-Haie	The arms of Saint-Nicolas-de-la-Haie are blazoned : Azure, on a pale Or between in bend 2 diamonds and in bend sinister 2 boars' heads argent, an abbatial crozier gules.

== Population ==
Historical population
Year	Pop.	±% p.a.
1968	178	—
1975	176	−0.16%
1982	268	+6.19%
1990	348	+3.32%
1999	379	+0.95%
2007	397	+0.58%
2012	404	+0.35%
2017	413	+0.44%
2023	408	−0.20%
Source: INSEE

== Places of interest ==
- The church of St. Nicholas, dating from the twelfth century.

== See also ==
- Communes of the Seine-Maritime department
