= Heurteauville =

- Commune
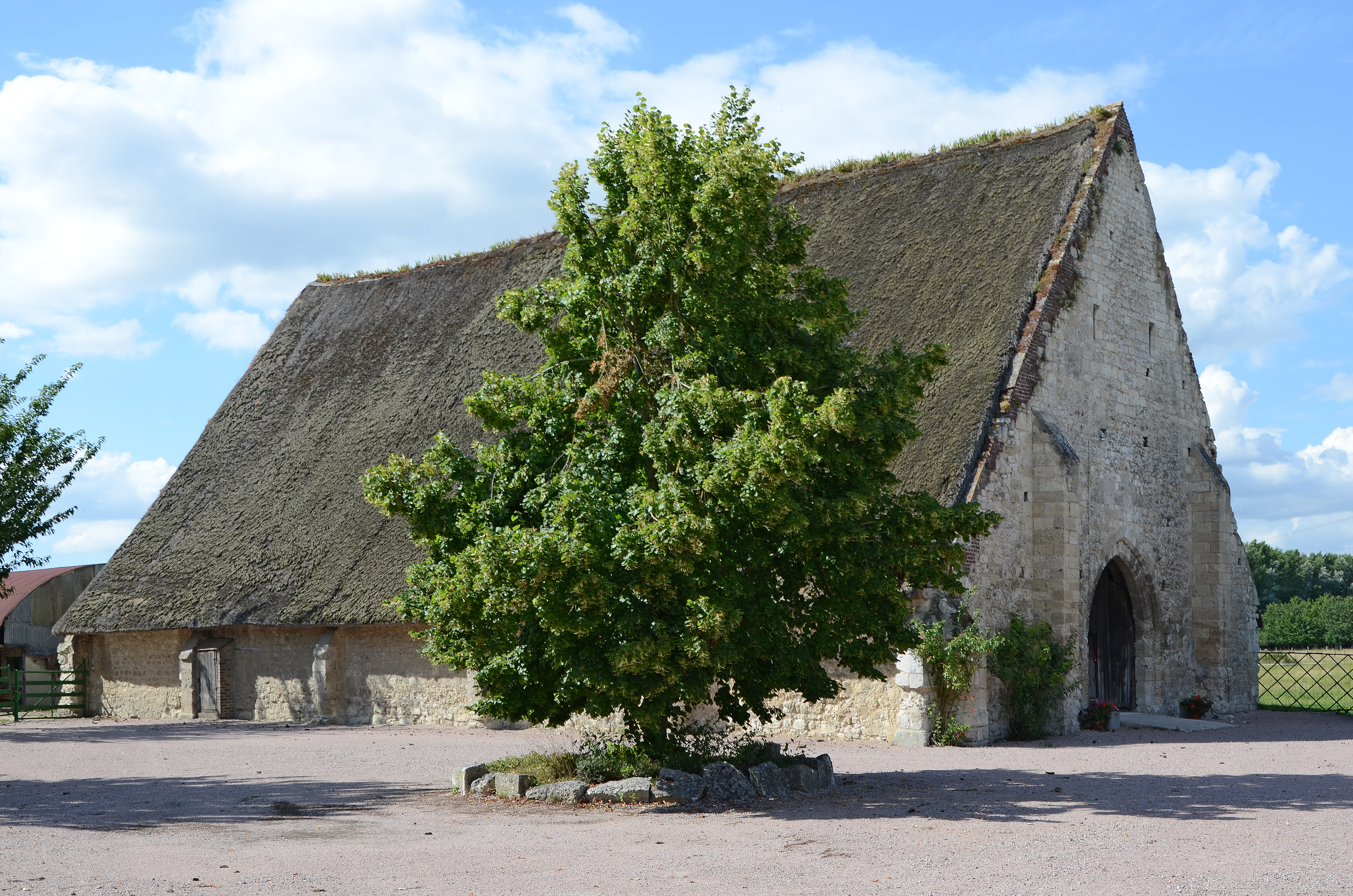
- A tithe barn in Heurteauville

- Coat of arms
- Location of Heurteauville
- Location within France Location within Normandy
- Coordinates: 49°26′43″N 0°48′51″E
- Country: France
- Region: Normandy
- Department: Seine-Maritime
- Arrondissement: Rouen
- Canton: Port-Jérôme-sur-Seine
- Intercommunality: Caux Seine Agglo

Government
  - Mayor (2026–32): Gérard Lenormand
- Area^{1}: 7.26 km^{2} (2.80 sq mi)
- Elevation: 4 m (13 ft)
- Highest elevation: 80 m (260 ft)
- Lowest elevation: 0 m (0 ft)
- Population (2023): 284
  - Density: 39.1/km^{2} (101/sq mi)
- Time zone: UTC+01:00 (CET)
  - Summer (DST): UTC+02:00 (CEST)
- INSEE/Postal code: 76362 /76940
- ^{1} French Land Register data, which excludes lakes, ponds, glaciers > 1 km^{2} (0.386 sq mi or 247 acres) and river estuaries.

Heurteauville (French pronunciation: [œʁtovil]) is a commune in the Seine-Maritime department in the Normandy region in north-western France. The commune was created in 1868 from part of the commune Jumièges.

== Geography ==
A farming village is situated in a meander of the river Seine, some 12 miles (19 km) west of Rouen, on the D65 road. Old peat bogs have been preserved as a nature reserve alongside the forest. The commune is thought to be unique in France for having two separate ferry services over the river.

== Population ==
Historical population

Year	Pop.	±% p.a.
1872	542	—
1901	352	−1.48%
1926	346	−0.07%
1946	402	+0.75%
1962	377	−0.40%
1968	309	−3.26%
1975	288	−1.00%

Year	Pop.	±% p.a.
1982	286	−0.10%
1990	269	−0.76%
1999	304	+1.37%
2007	307	+0.12%
2012	345	+2.36%
2017	310	−2.12%
2023	284	−1.45%

Source: EHESS and INSEE (1968-2023)

== Places of interest ==
- The church of Saint-Simon-and-Saint-Jude, dating from the eighteenth century.
- The vestiges of the chapel of Sainte-Austreberthe at Port-Jumièges.
- A twelfth century barn dimière.
- A lime kiln.
- A Sundial
- 2 ferryboats to Yainville and Jumièges
- the sundial

== See also ==
- Communes of the Seine-Maritime department
