= Petiville, Seine-Maritime =

Petiville
- Commune
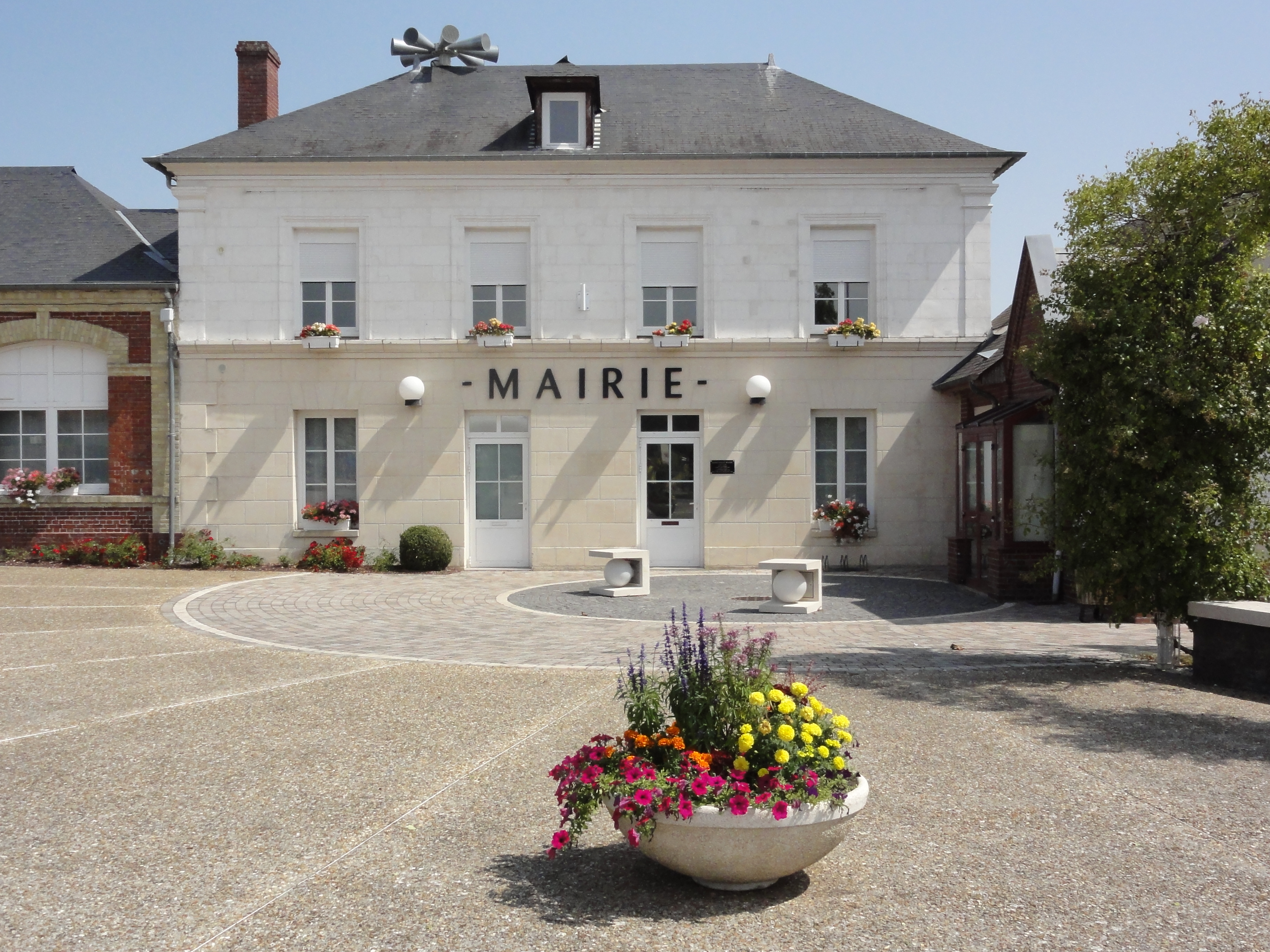
- Petiville (Seine-Mar.) Town hall

- Coat of arms
- Location of Petiville
- Location within France Location within Normandy
- Coordinates: 49°27′40″N 0°35′18″E
- Country: France
- Region: Normandy
- Department: Seine-Maritime
- Arrondissement: Le Havre
- Canton: Port-Jérôme-sur-Seine
- Intercommunality: Caux Seine Agglo

Government
  - Mayor (2026–32): Moïse Moreira
- Area^{1}: 16.74 km^{2} (6.46 sq mi)
- Elevation: 15 m (49 ft)
- Highest elevation: 38 m (125 ft)
- Lowest elevation: 0 m (0 ft)
- Population (2023): 1,211
  - Density: 72.34/km^{2} (187.4/sq mi)
- Time zone: UTC+01:00 (CET)
  - Summer (DST): UTC+02:00 (CEST)
- INSEE/Postal code: 76499 /76330
- ^{1} French Land Register data, which excludes lakes, ponds, glaciers > 1 km^{2} (0.386 sq mi or 247 acres) and river estuaries.

Petiville (French pronunciation: [pətivil]) is a commune in the Seine-Maritime department in the Normandy region in northern France.

== Geography ==
A farming and quarrying village in the Pays de Caux, situated some 22 miles (35 km) east of Le Havre, at the junction of the D28 and the D281 roads. The meandering river Seine forms the commune's southern and western borders.

== Heraldry ==
Arms of Petiville	The arms of Petiville are blazoned : Argent, on a bend wavy azure between a leopard and a buckle reversed gules, a sword Or.

== Population ==
Historical population
Year	Pop.	±% p.a.
1968	765	—
1975	980	+3.60%
1982	922	−0.87%
1990	970	+0.64%
1999	982	+0.14%
2007	1,040	+0.72%
2012	1,066	+0.50%
2017	1,125	+1.08%
2023	1,211	+1.24%
Source: INSEE

== Places of interest ==
- The church of St. Martin, dating from the nineteenth century.

== See also ==
- Communes of the Seine-Maritime department
