= Norville =

- Commune
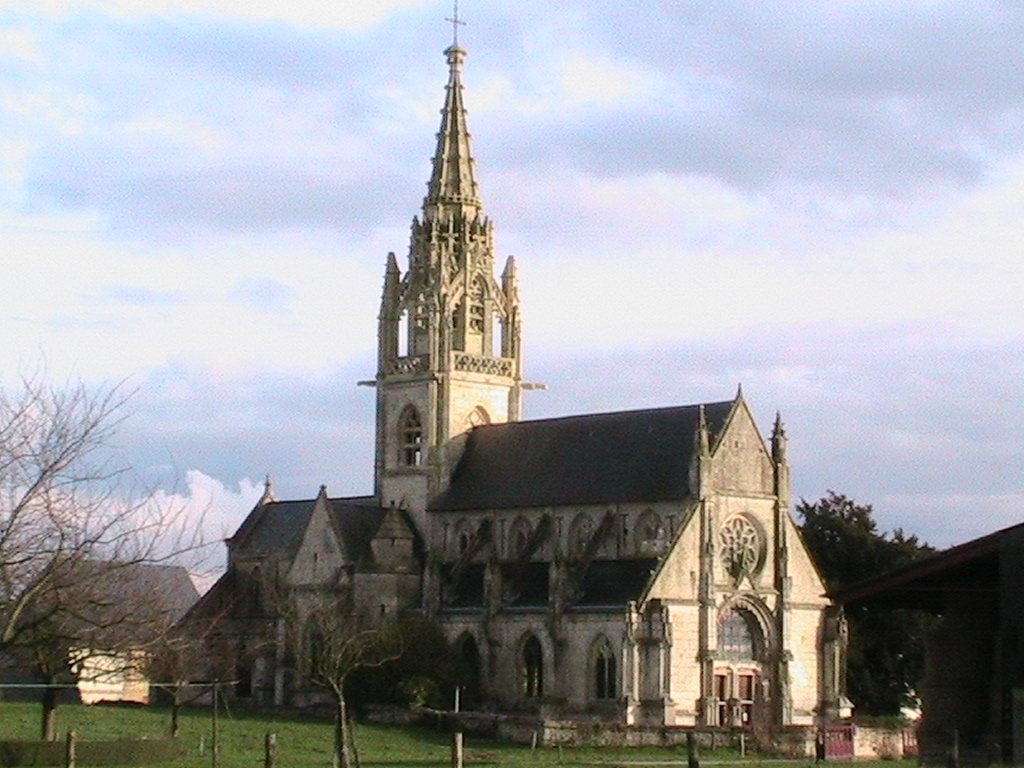
- The church in Norville
- Location of Norville
- Location within France Location within Normandy
- Coordinates: 49°28′35″N 0°38′23″E
- Country: France
- Region: Normandy
- Department: Seine-Maritime
- Arrondissement: Le Havre
- Canton: Port-Jérôme-sur-Seine
- Intercommunality: Caux Seine Agglo

Government
  - Mayor (2026–32): Reynald Hauchard
- Area^{1}: 11.69 km^{2} (4.51 sq mi)
- Elevation: 50 m (160 ft)
- Highest elevation: 131 m (430 ft)
- Lowest elevation: 0 m (0 ft)
- Population (2023): 996
  - Density: 85.2/km^{2} (221/sq mi)
- Time zone: UTC+01:00 (CET)
  - Summer (DST): UTC+02:00 (CEST)
- INSEE/Postal code: 76471 /76330
- ^{1} French Land Register data, which excludes lakes, ponds, glaciers > 1 km^{2} (0.386 sq mi or 247 acres) and river estuaries.

Norville (French pronunciation: [nɔʁvil]) is a commune in the Seine-Maritime department in the Normandy region in northern France.

== Geography ==
A farming village in the Pays de Caux, situated by the banks of the river Seine, some 23 miles (37 km) east yof Le Havre, at the junction of the D81 and D281 roads.

== Population ==
Historical population
Year	Pop.	±% p.a.
1968	674	—
1975	825	+2.93%
1982	836	+0.19%
1990	827	−0.14%
1999	807	−0.27%
2007	886	+1.17%
2012	902	+0.36%
2017	987	+1.82%
2023	996	+0.15%
Source: INSEE

== Places of interest ==
- The church of St. Martin, dating from the thirteenth century.
- A fifteenth century manorhouse .

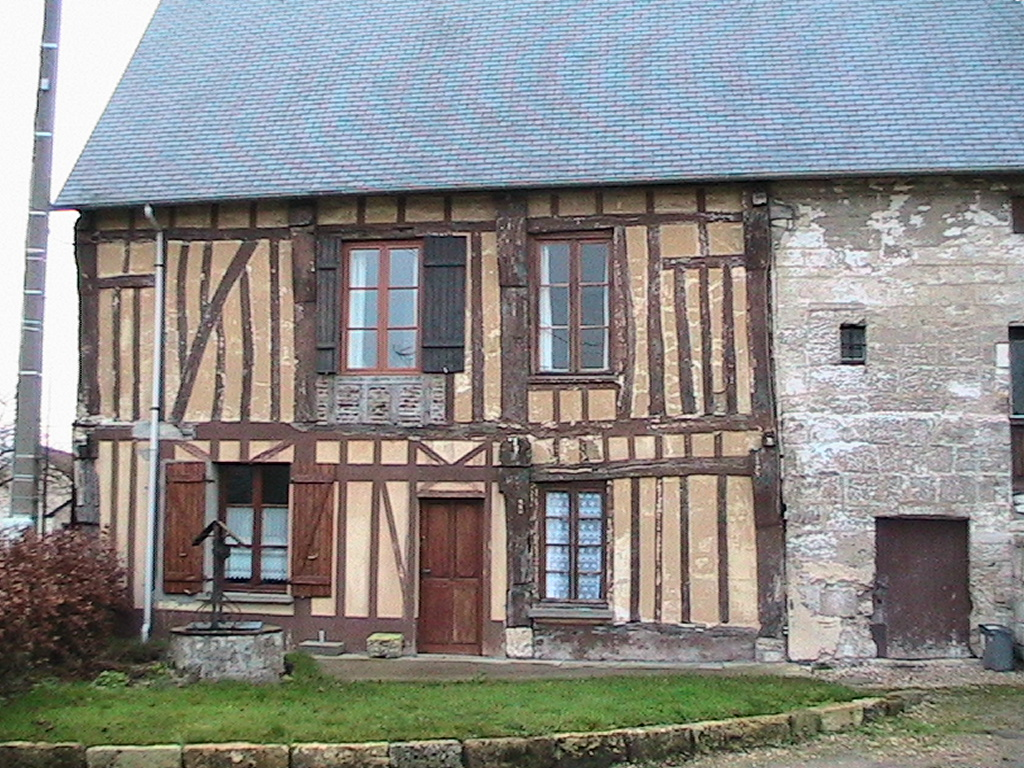
The manor

== See also ==
- Communes of the Seine-Maritime department
