= Maulévrier-Sainte-Gertrude =

- Commune
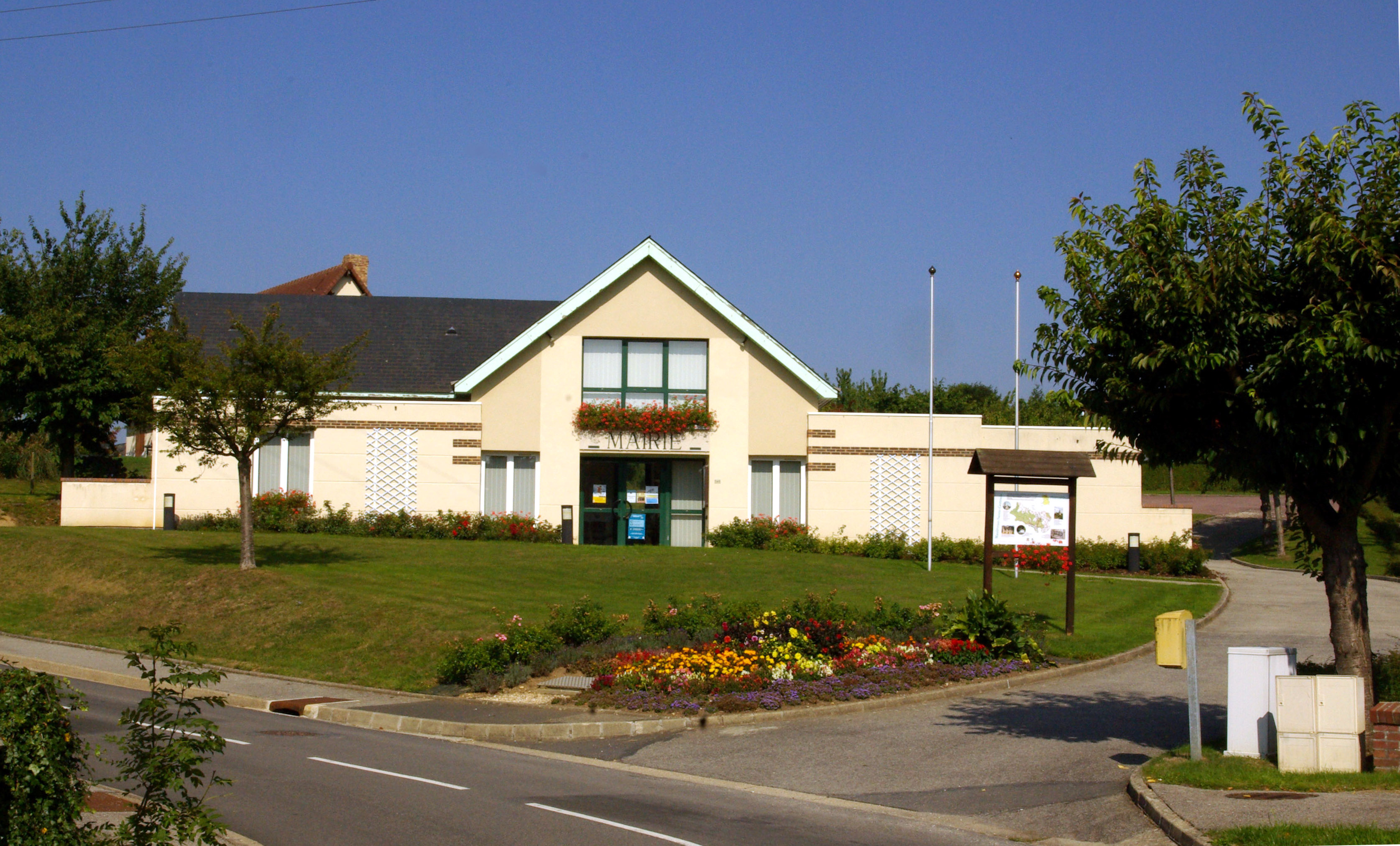
- The town hall in Maulévrier-Sainte-Gertrude

- Coat of arms
- Location of Maulévrier-Sainte-Gertrude
- Location within France Location within Normandy
- Coordinates: 49°33′20″N 0°43′18″E
- Country: France
- Region: Normandy
- Department: Seine-Maritime
- Arrondissement: Rouen
- Canton: Port-Jérôme-sur-Seine
- Intercommunality: Caux Seine Agglo

Government
  - Mayor (2026–32): David Malandain
- Area^{1}: 14.16 km^{2} (5.47 sq mi)
- Elevation: 120 m (390 ft)
- Highest elevation: 144 m (472 ft)
- Lowest elevation: 7 m (23 ft)
- Population (2023): 1,053
  - Density: 74.36/km^{2} (192.6/sq mi)
- Time zone: UTC+01:00 (CET)
  - Summer (DST): UTC+02:00 (CEST)
- INSEE/Postal code: 76418 /76490
- ^{1} French Land Register data, which excludes lakes, ponds, glaciers > 1 km^{2} (0.386 sq mi or 247 acres) and river estuaries.

Maulévrier-Sainte-Gertrude (French pronunciation: [molevʁije sɛ̃t ʒɛʁtʁyd]) is a commune in the Seine-Maritime department in the Normandy region in northern France.

== Geography ==
A farming village situated in the Pays de Caux, it is located some 24 miles (39 km) northwest of Rouen at the junction of the D40 and D281 and also the D131 and D490 roads.

== Heraldry ==
Arms of Maulévrier-Sainte-Gertrude	The arms of Maulévrier-Sainte-Gertrude are blazoned : Quarterly 1: Argent, a tower sable open and pierced of the field; 2: Azure, a greyhound argent, collared gules; 3: Azure, a fess wavy argent, overall a crozier Or palewise; 4: Argent 3 millrinds gules.

== Population ==
Historical population
Year	Pop.	±% p.a.
1968	621	—
1975	685	+1.41%
1982	905	+4.06%
1990	922	+0.23%
1999	905	−0.21%
2007	912	+0.10%
2012	985	+1.55%
2017	987	+0.04%
2023	1,053	+1.08%
Source: INSEE

== Places of interest ==
- The church of St. Gertrude, dating from the sixteenth century.
- The church of St.Léonard, dating from the eleventh century.
- The thirteenth century donjon.
- Traces of another feudal castle.

== See also ==
- Communes of the Seine-Maritime department
