= Louvetot =

- Commune
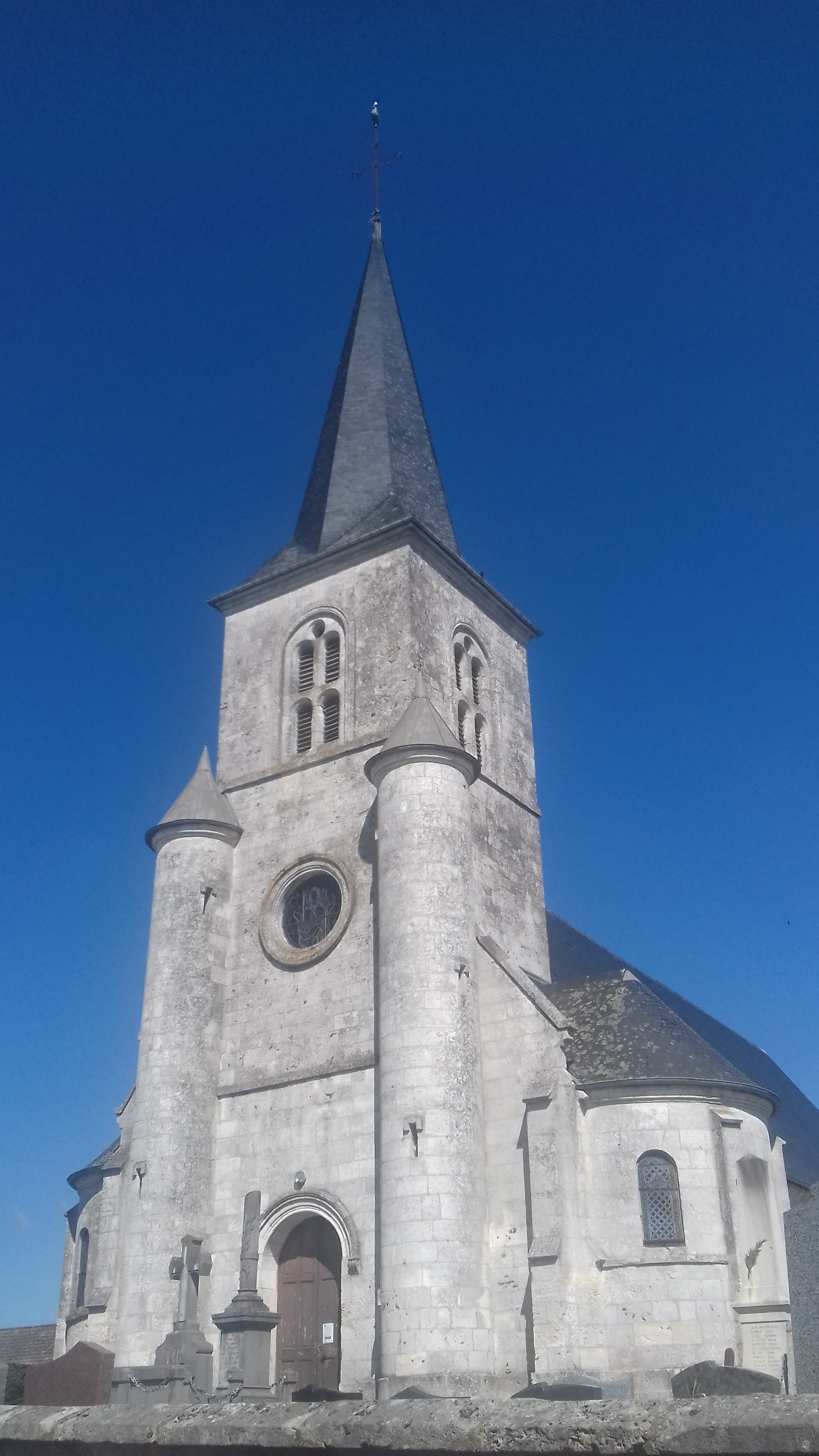

- Coat of arms
- Location of Louvetot
- Location within France Location within Normandy
- Coordinates: 49°34′21″N 0°42′50″E
- Country: France
- Region: Normandy
- Department: Seine-Maritime
- Arrondissement: Rouen
- Canton: Port-Jérôme-sur-Seine
- Intercommunality: Caux Seine Agglo

Government
  - Mayor (2020–2026): Alain Legrand
- Area^{1}: 7.37 km^{2} (2.85 sq mi)
- Elevation: 140 m (460 ft)
- Highest elevation: 152 m (499 ft)
- Lowest elevation: 37 m (121 ft)
- Population (2023): 783
  - Density: 106/km^{2} (275/sq mi)
- Time zone: UTC+01:00 (CET)
  - Summer (DST): UTC+02:00 (CEST)
- INSEE/Postal code: 76398 /76490
- ^{1} French Land Register data, which excludes lakes, ponds, glaciers > 1 km^{2} (0.386 sq mi or 247 acres) and river estuaries.

Louvetot is a commune in the Seine-Maritime department in the Normandy region in northern France.

== Geography ==
A farming village situated in the Pays de Caux, some 20 miles (32 km) northwest of Rouen, at the junction of the D33 and the D131 roads.

== Heraldry ==
Arms of Louvetot	The arms of Louvetot are blazoned : Azure, a chevron Or between an oaktree, an abbot's crozier and a barrow, and on a chief argent a wolf passant sable.

== Population ==
Historical population
Year	Pop.	±% p.a.
1968	417	—
1975	439	+0.74%
1982	500	+1.88%
1990	562	+1.47%
1999	575	+0.25%
2007	692	+2.34%
2012	658	−1.00%
2017	738	+2.32%
2023	783	+0.99%
Source: INSEE

== Places of interest ==
- The church of Notre-Dame, dating from the thirteenth century.
- An old manorhouse.

== See also ==
- Communes of the Seine-Maritime department
