= Saint-Aubin-de-Crétot =

- Commune
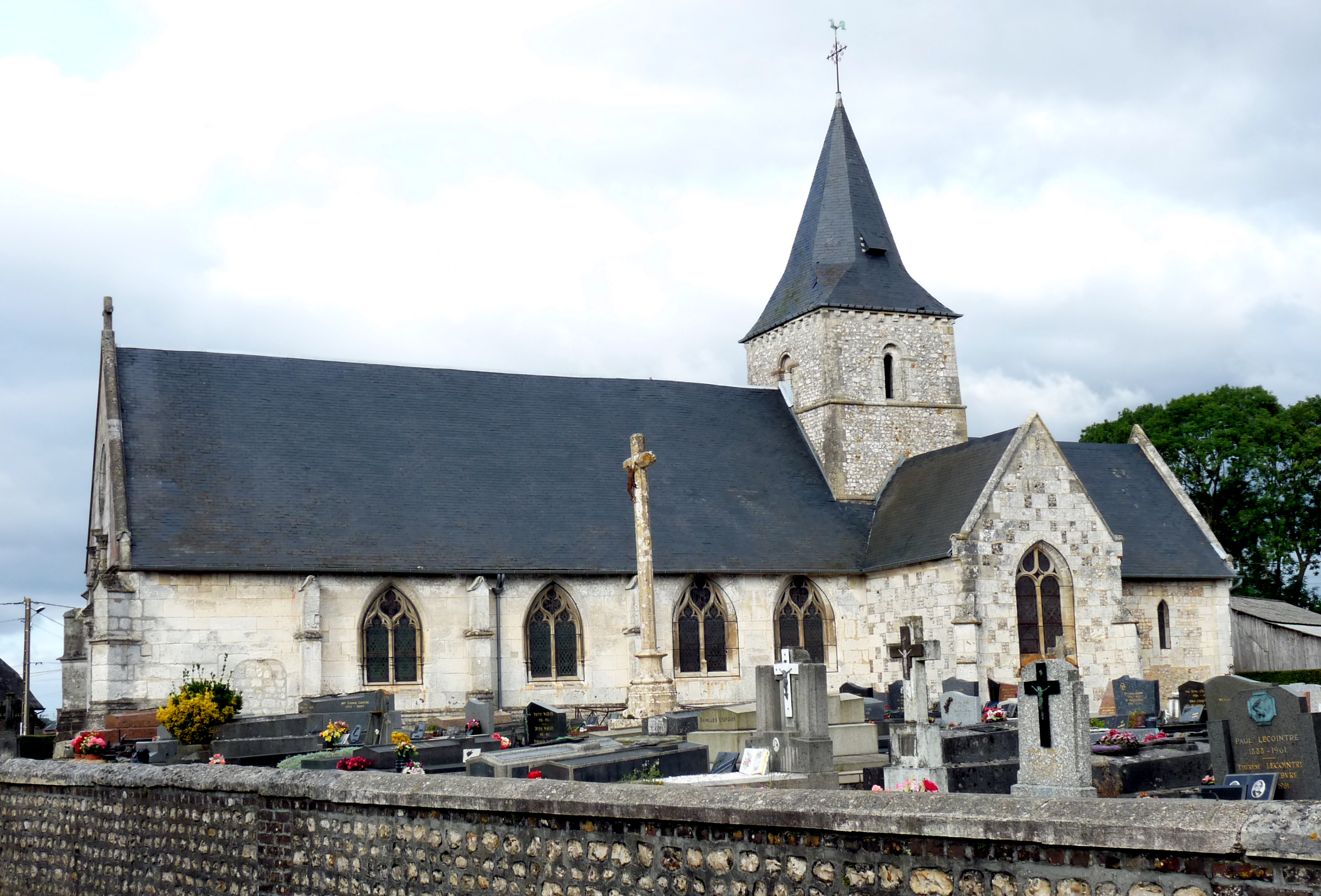
- The church in Saint-Aubin-de-Crétot

- Coat of arms
- Location of Saint-Aubin-de-Crétot
- Location within France Location within Normandy
- Coordinates: 49°34′12″N 0°38′22″E
- Country: France
- Region: Normandy
- Department: Seine-Maritime
- Arrondissement: Rouen
- Canton: Port-Jérôme-sur-Seine
- Intercommunality: Caux Seine Agglo

Government
  - Mayor (2026–32): Gilles Duval
- Area^{1}: 4.73 km^{2} (1.83 sq mi)
- Elevation: 147 m (482 ft)
- Highest elevation: 154 m (505 ft)
- Lowest elevation: 80 m (260 ft)
- Population (2023): 524
  - Density: 111/km^{2} (287/sq mi)
- Time zone: UTC+01:00 (CET)
  - Summer (DST): UTC+02:00 (CEST)
- INSEE/Postal code: 76559 /76190
- ^{1} French Land Register data, which excludes lakes, ponds, glaciers > 1 km^{2} (0.386 sq mi or 247 acres) and river estuaries.

Saint-Aubin-de-Crétot (French pronunciation: [sɛ̃.t‿obɛ̃ də kʁeto]) is a commune in the Seine-Maritime department in the Normandy region in northern France.

== Geography ==
A farming village situated in the Pays de Caux, some 25 miles (40 km) northwest of Rouen near the junction of the D34 and the D40 roads.

== Heraldry ==
Arms of Saint-Aubin-de-Crétot	The arms of Saint-Aubin-de-Crétot are blazoned : Argent, on a chevron azure between 2 mallets and a rose gules, an escallop Or.

== Population ==
Historical population
Year	Pop.	±% p.a.
1968	209	—
1975	211	+0.14%
1982	374	+8.52%
1990	465	+2.76%
1999	474	+0.21%
2007	516	+1.07%
2012	572	+2.08%
2017	522	−1.81%
2023	524	+0.06%
Source: INSEE

== Places of interest ==
- The church of St. Aubin, dating from the twelfth century.
- The seventeenth-century chateau.

== See also ==
- Communes of the Seine-Maritime department
