= Grand-Camp, Seine-Maritime =

Grand-Camp
- Commune
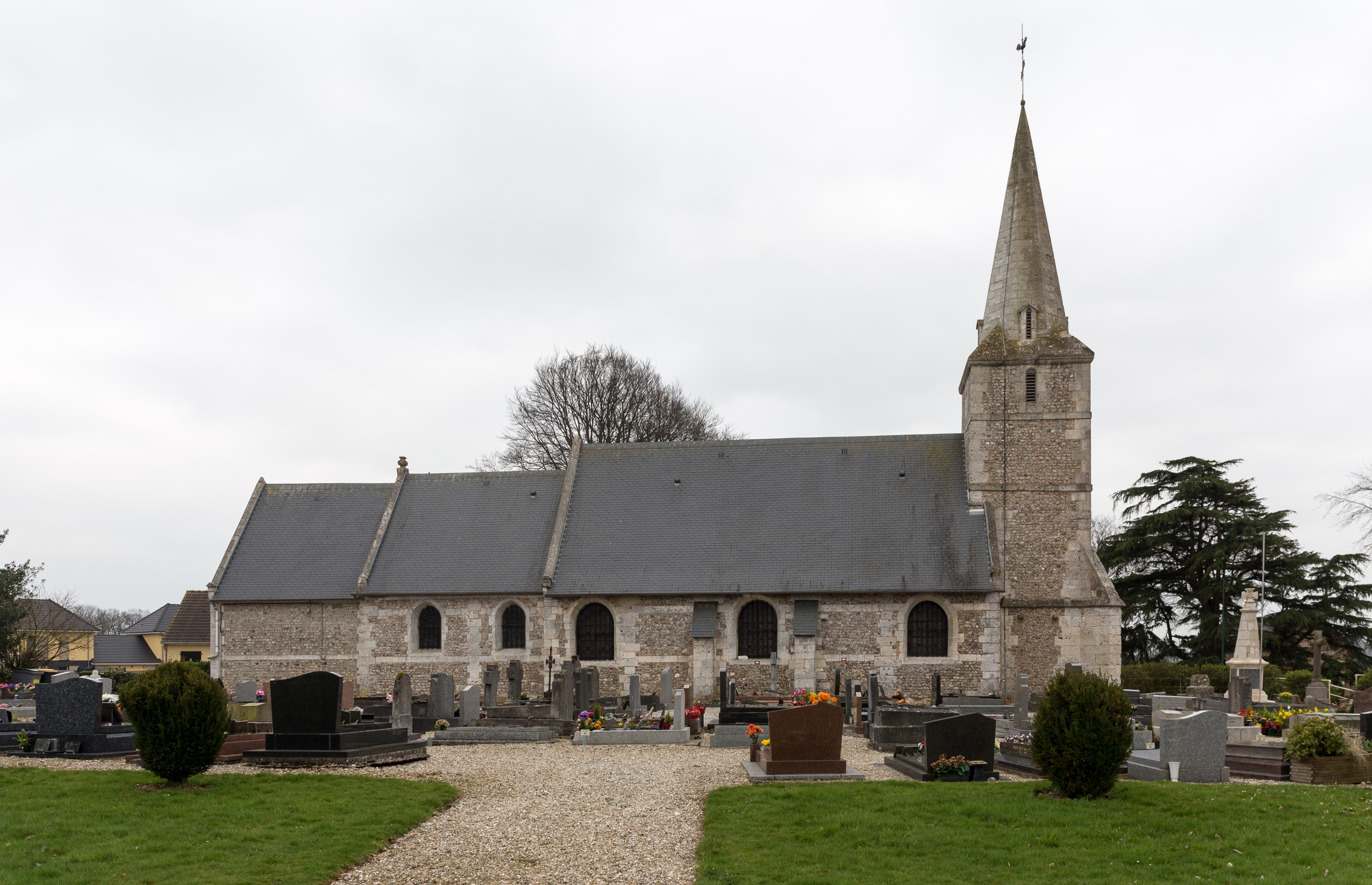
- The church in Grand-Camp

- Coat of arms
- Location of Grand-Camp
- Location within France Location within Normandy
- Coordinates: 49°33′33″N 0°35′40″E
- Country: France
- Region: Normandy
- Department: Seine-Maritime
- Arrondissement: Le Havre
- Canton: Port-Jérôme-sur-Seine
- Intercommunality: Caux Seine Agglo

Government
  - Mayor (2023–2026): Nadine Morisse
- Area^{1}: 4.91 km^{2} (1.90 sq mi)
- Elevation: 142 m (466 ft)
- Highest elevation: 154 m (505 ft)
- Lowest elevation: 100 m (330 ft)
- Population (2023): 763
  - Density: 155/km^{2} (402/sq mi)
- Time zone: UTC+01:00 (CET)
  - Summer (DST): UTC+02:00 (CEST)
- INSEE/Postal code: 76318 /76170
- ^{1} French Land Register data, which excludes lakes, ponds, glaciers > 1 km^{2} (0.386 sq mi or 247 acres) and river estuaries.

Grand-Camp (French pronunciation: [ɡʁɑ̃ kɑ̃]) is a commune in the Seine-Maritime department in the Normandy region in northern France.

== Geography ==
Grand-Camp is a farming village situated in the Pays de Caux, some 21 miles (34 km) east of Le Havre, at the junction of the D26 and D28 roads.

== Population ==
Historical population
| Year | Pop. | ±% p.a. |
|---|---|---|
| 1968 | 187 | — |
| 1975 | 253 | +4.41% |
| 1982 | 431 | +7.91% |
| 1990 | 579 | +3.76% |
| 1999 | 651 | +1.31% |
| 2007 | 695 | +0.82% |
| 2012 | 660 | −1.03% |
| 2017 | 708 | +1.41% |
| 2023 | 763 | +1.25% |
Source: INSEE

== Places of interest ==
- The church of St-Michel, dating from the seventeenth century.
- The eighteenth century chateau du Bouillon.

== See also ==
- Communes of the Seine-Maritime department
