= Notre-Dame-de-Bliquetuit =

- Commune
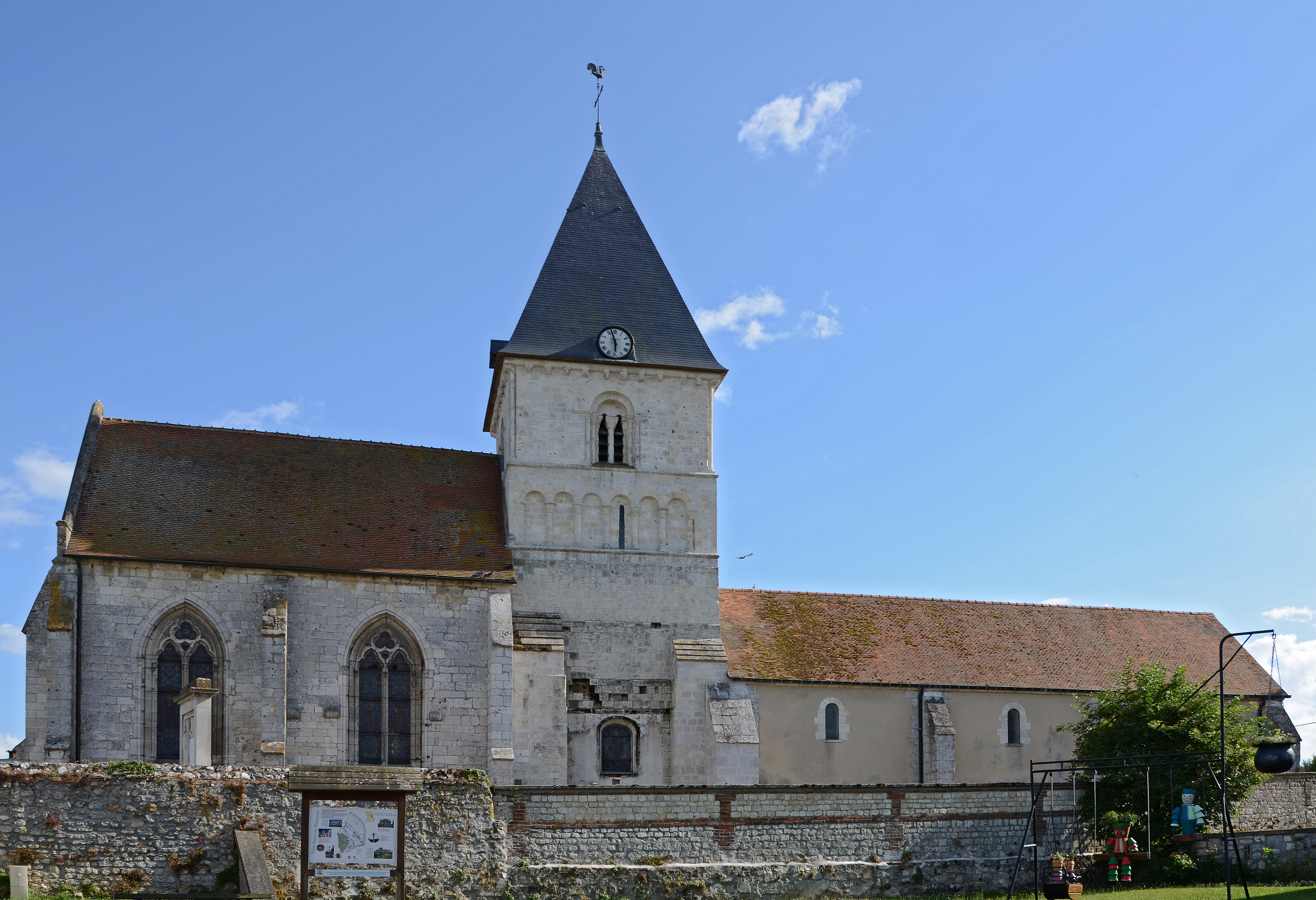
- The church in Notre-Dame-de-Bliquetuit
- Location of Notre-Dame-de-Bliquetuit
- Location within France Location within Normandy
- Coordinates: 49°29′38″N 0°45′48″E
- Country: France
- Region: Normandy
- Department: Seine-Maritime
- Arrondissement: Rouen
- Canton: Port-Jérôme-sur-Seine
- Intercommunality: Caux Seine Agglo

Government
  - Mayor (2020–2026): Fabienne Duparc
- Area^{1}: 9.78 km^{2} (3.78 sq mi)
- Elevation: 11 m (36 ft)
- Highest elevation: 53 m (174 ft)
- Lowest elevation: 1 m (3.3 ft)
- Population (2023): 826
  - Density: 84.5/km^{2} (219/sq mi)
- Time zone: UTC+01:00 (CET)
  - Summer (DST): UTC+02:00 (CEST)
- INSEE/Postal code: 76473 /76940
- ^{1} French Land Register data, which excludes lakes, ponds, glaciers > 1 km^{2} (0.386 sq mi or 247 acres) and river estuaries.

Notre-Dame-de-Bliquetuit (French pronunciation: [nɔtʁ dam də bliktɥi]) is a commune in the Seine-Maritime department in the Normandy region in northern France.

== Geography ==
A farming village situated in the Pays de Caux by the banks of the river Seine, some 16 miles (26 km) west of Rouen at the junction of the D490 and the D65 roads. The nearby Brotonne bridge was, until the late 20th century, the only bridge over the Seine downstream of Rouen.

The office of the Parc naturel régional des Boucles de la Seine Normande is located in Notre-Dame-de-Bliquetuit.

== Population ==
Historical population
Year	Pop.	±% p.a.
1968	393	—
1975	413	+0.71%
1982	469	+1.83%
1990	504	+0.90%
1999	559	+1.16%
2007	641	+1.73%
2012	733	+2.72%
2017	754	+0.57%
2023	826	+1.53%
Source: INSEE

== Places of interest ==
- The church of Notre-Dame, dating from the eleventh century.
- The Notre-Dame manorhouse.
- A sixteenth century dovecote.
- The Maison du Parc, an ancient farmhouse.

== See also ==
- Communes of the Seine-Maritime department
