= Anquetierville =

- Commune
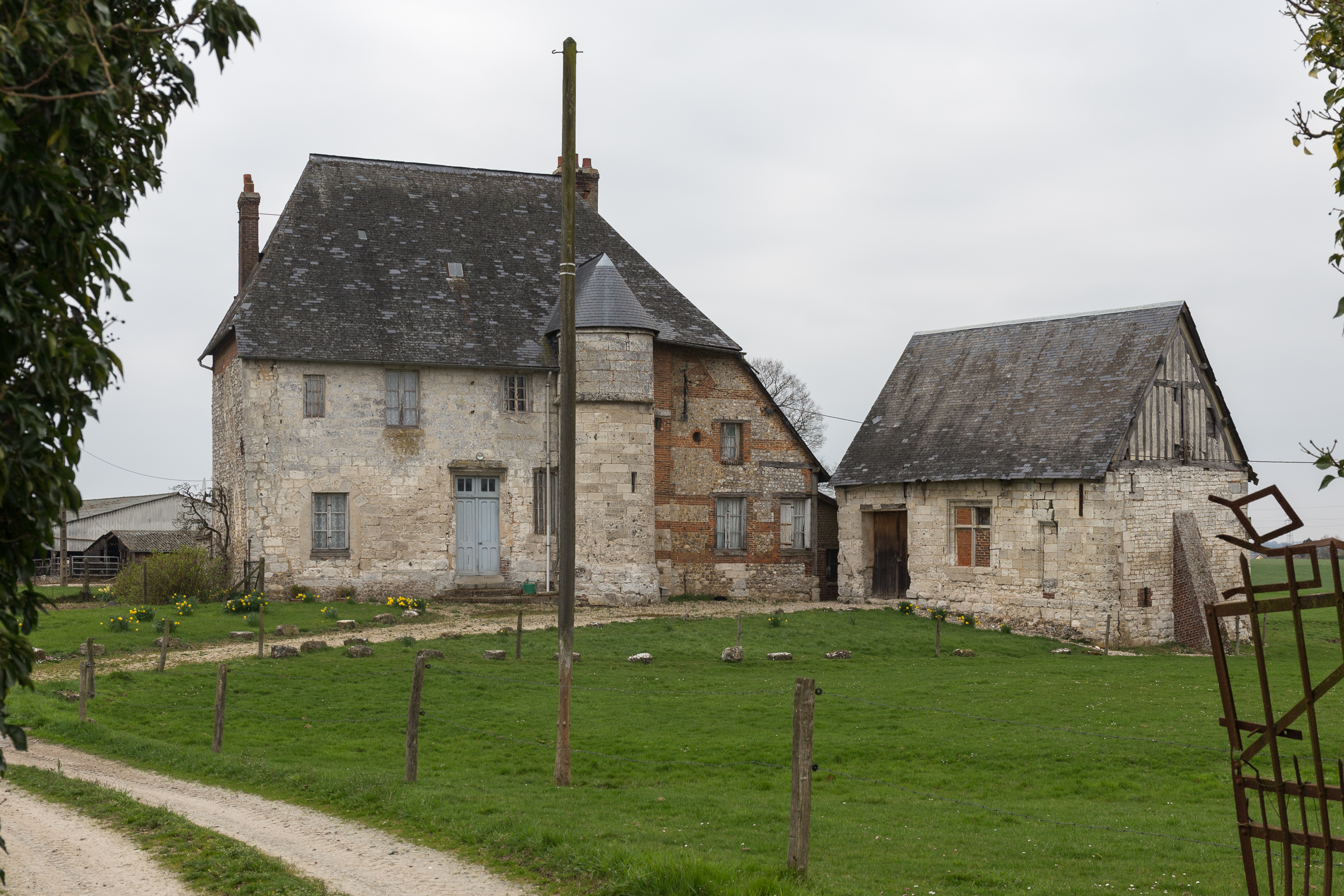
- 15th-century manor in Anquetierville
- Location of Anquetierville
- Location within France Location within Normandy
- Coordinates: 49°31′57″N 0°38′08″E
- Country: France
- Region: Normandy
- Department: Seine-Maritime
- Arrondissement: Rouen
- Canton: Port-Jérôme-sur-Seine
- Intercommunality: Caux Seine Agglo

Government
  - Mayor (2020–2026): Didier Feron
- Area^{1}: 4.08 km^{2} (1.58 sq mi)
- Elevation: 135 m (443 ft)
- Highest elevation: 153 m (502 ft)
- Lowest elevation: 98 m (322 ft)
- Population (2023): 329
  - Density: 80.6/km^{2} (209/sq mi)
- Time zone: UTC+01:00 (CET)
  - Summer (DST): UTC+02:00 (CEST)
- INSEE/Postal code: 76022 /76490
- ^{1} French Land Register data, which excludes lakes, ponds, glaciers > 1 km^{2} (0.386 sq mi or 247 acres) and river estuaries.

Anquetierville is a commune in the Seine-Maritime department in the Normandy region in northern France.

== Geography ==
A farming village situated in the Pays de Caux, some 24 miles (39 km) northwest of Rouen at the junction of the D440, D982 and the D28 roads.

== Population ==
Historical population
Year	Pop.	±% p.a.
1968	212	—
1975	215	+0.20%
1982	258	+2.64%
1990	361	+4.29%
1999	337	−0.76%
2007	362	+0.90%
2012	355	−0.39%
2017	341	−0.80%
2023	329	−0.60%
Source: INSEE

== Places of interest ==
- The church of Saint-Amand, dating from the thirteenth century.

== See also ==
- Communes of the Seine-Maritime department
