= Vatteville-la-Rue =

- Commune
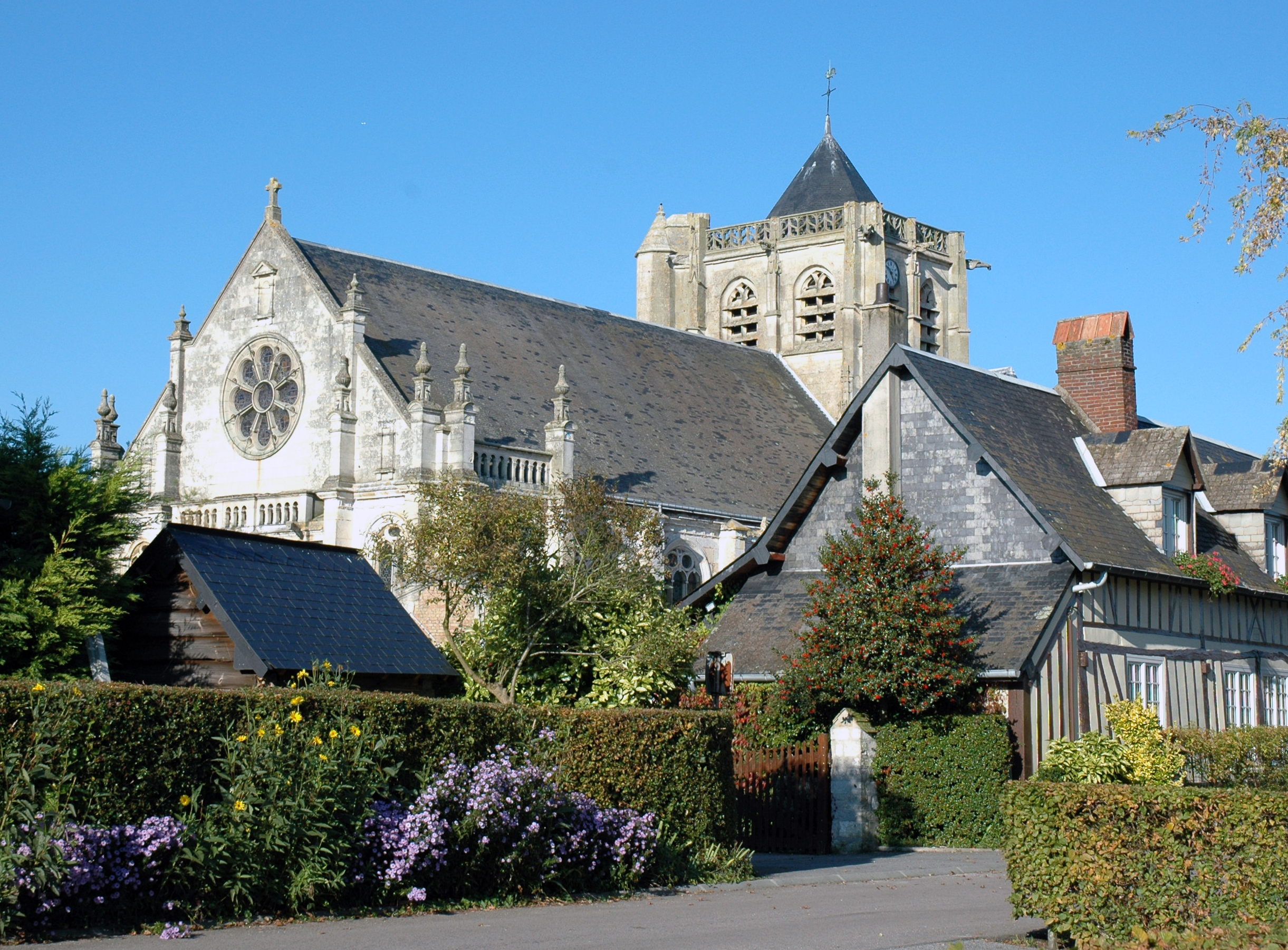
- The church in Vatteville-la-Rue

- Coat of arms
- Location of Vatteville-la-Rue
- Location within France Location within Normandy
- Coordinates: 49°29′21″N 0°41′11″E
- Country: France
- Region: Normandy
- Department: Seine-Maritime
- Arrondissement: Rouen
- Canton: Port-Jérôme-sur-Seine
- Intercommunality: Caux Seine Agglo

Government
  - Mayor (2026–32): Jacques Charron
- Area^{1}: 51.14 km^{2} (19.75 sq mi)
- Elevation: 15 m (49 ft)
- Highest elevation: 125 m (410 ft)
- Lowest elevation: 0 m (0 ft)
- Population (2023): 1,103
  - Density: 21.57/km^{2} (55.86/sq mi)
- Time zone: UTC+01:00 (CET)
  - Summer (DST): UTC+02:00 (CEST)
- INSEE/Postal code: 76727 /76940
- ^{1} French Land Register data, which excludes lakes, ponds, glaciers > 1 km^{2} (0.386 sq mi or 247 acres) and river estuaries.

Vatteville-la-Rue (French pronunciation: [vatvil la ʁy]) is a commune in the Seine-Maritime department in the Normandy region in northern France.

== Geography ==
A village of forestry and farming situated in a meander of the river Seine in the Pays de Caux, some 22 miles (35 km) west of Rouen on the D65 and D40. The area is popular for the hunting of boar and deer. There is also considerable sand and gravel extraction at the large quarries.

== Heraldry ==
Arms of Vatteville-la-Rue	The arms of the commune of Vatteville-la-Rue are blazoned : Gules, a 3-masted ship Or, and on a chief argent, a salamandre between an ash leaf and an oak leaf sable.

== Population ==
Historical population
Year	Pop.	±% p.a.
1968	694	—
1975	636	−1.24%
1982	746	+2.31%
1990	897	+2.33%
1999	890	−0.09%
2007	1,034	+1.89%
2012	1,107	+1.37%
2017	1,140	+0.59%
2023	1,103	−0.55%
Source: INSEE

== Places of interest ==
- The church of St. Martin, dating from the sixteenth century.
- The chapel of St. Maur, also dating from the sixteenth century.
- Traces of several Roman villas in the forest of Brotonne.
- The ruins of a castle destroyed in 1123.
- Vestiges of the chateau of Quesney.
- A seventeenth-century windmill, in ruins.

== People ==
- Philosopher Alain Etchegoyen (1951–2007) is buried here.

== See also ==
- Communes of the Seine-Maritime department
