= Saint-Arnoult, Seine-Maritime =

Saint-Arnoult
- Commune
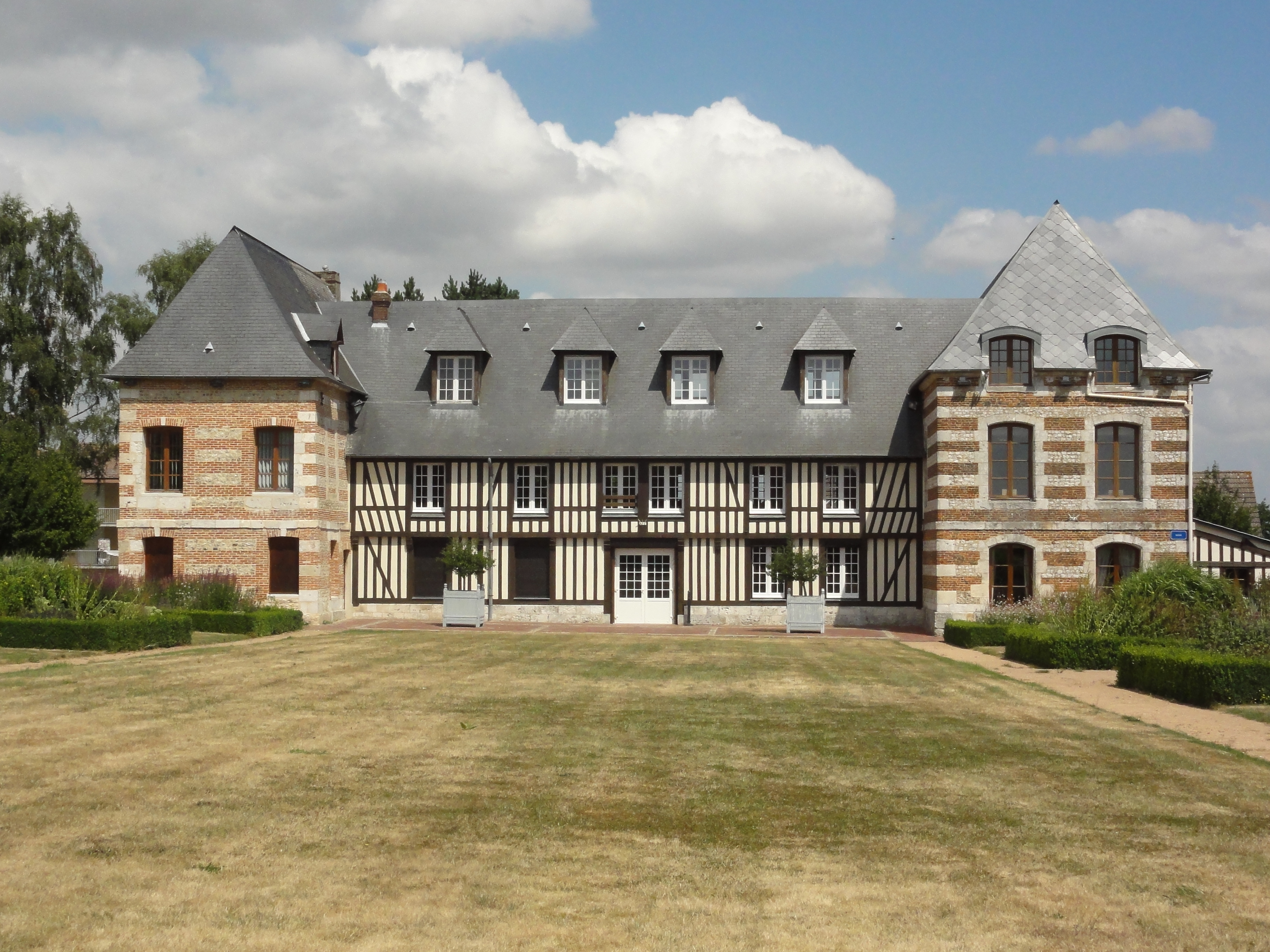
- Saint-Arnoult Town hall

- Coat of arms
- Location of Saint-Arnoult
- Location within France Location within Normandy
- Coordinates: 49°31′47″N 0°40′07″E
- Country: France
- Region: Normandy
- Department: Seine-Maritime
- Arrondissement: Rouen
- Canton: Port-Jérôme-sur-Seine
- Intercommunality: Caux Seine Agglo

Government
  - Mayor (2026–32): Boris Dubuc
- Area^{1}: 13.86 km^{2} (5.35 sq mi)
- Elevation: 130 m (430 ft)
- Highest elevation: 146 m (479 ft)
- Lowest elevation: 9 m (30 ft)
- Population (2023): 1,446
  - Density: 104.3/km^{2} (270.2/sq mi)
- Time zone: UTC+01:00 (CET)
  - Summer (DST): UTC+02:00 (CEST)
- INSEE/Postal code: 76557 /76490
- ^{1} French Land Register data, which excludes lakes, ponds, glaciers > 1 km^{2} (0.386 sq mi or 247 acres) and river estuaries.

Saint-Arnoult (French pronunciation: [sɛ̃.t‿aʁnu]) is a commune in the Seine-Maritime department in the Normandy region in northern France.

== Geography ==
A farming village situated by the banks of the Seine, some 23 miles (37 km) northwest of Rouen at the junction of the D982, D440 and the D281 roads.

== Heraldry ==
Arms of Saint-Arnoult	The arms of Saint-Arnoult are blazoned : Azure, in pale 3 sticks fesswise argent.

== Population ==
Historical population
Year	Pop.	±% p.a.
1968	477	—
1975	530	+1.52%
1982	1,165	+11.91%
1990	1,380	+2.14%
1999	1,356	−0.19%
2007	1,307	−0.46%
2012	1,325	+0.27%
2017	1,384	+0.88%
2023	1,446	+0.73%
Source: INSEE

== Places of interest ==
- The church of St. Arnoult, dating from the thirteenth century.
- A sixteenth-century stone cross.
- A manorhouse.
- Remnants of the château de la Pommeraye.

== See also ==
- Communes of the Seine-Maritime department
