= La Frénaye =

- Commune
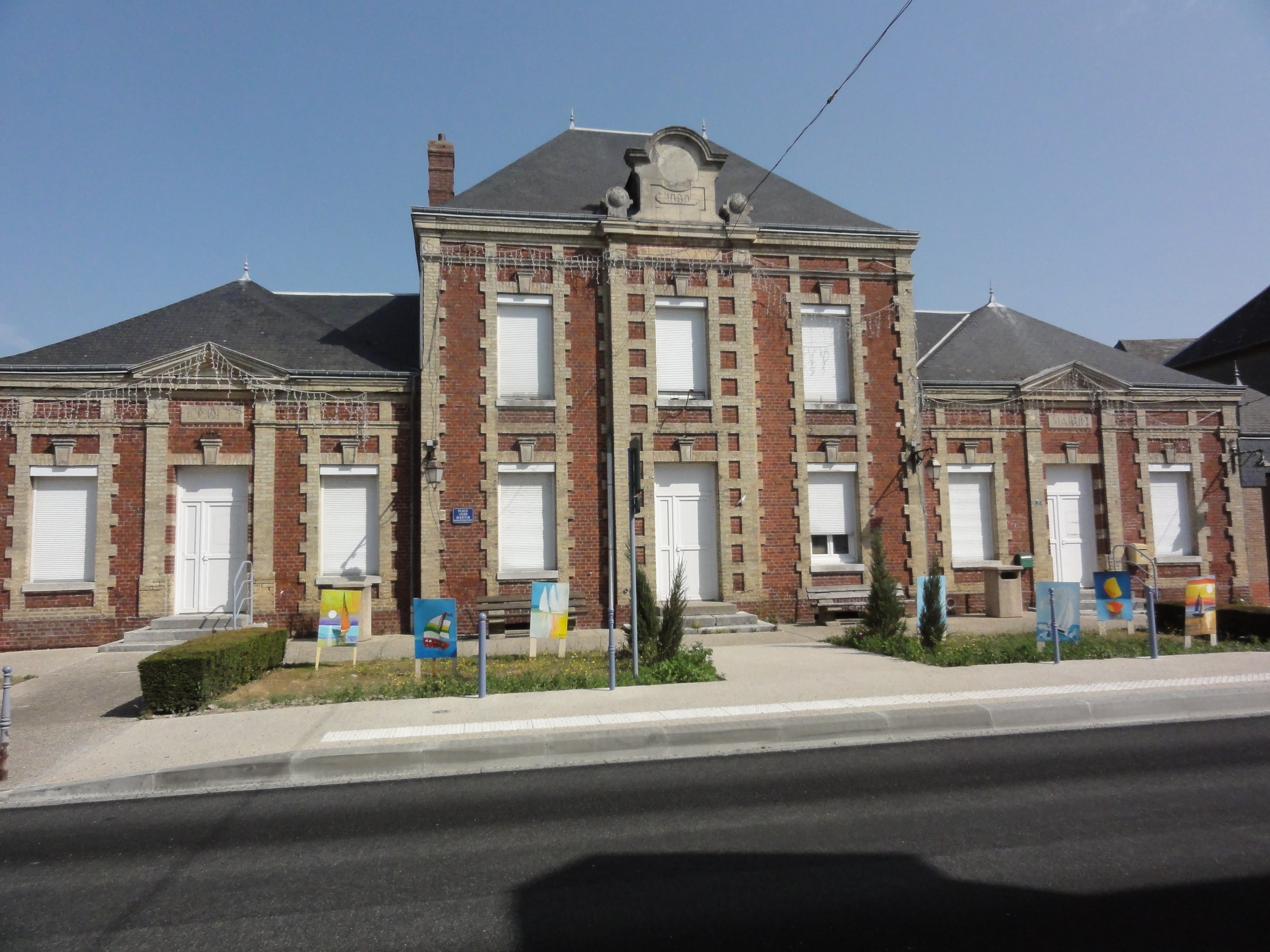
- La Frénaye Town hall

- Coat of arms
- Location of La Frénaye
- Location within France Location within Normandy
- Coordinates: 49°31′41″N 0°34′29″E
- Country: France
- Region: Normandy
- Department: Seine-Maritime
- Arrondissement: Le Havre
- Canton: Port-Jérôme-sur-Seine
- Intercommunality: Caux Seine Agglo

Government
  - Mayor (2026–32): Christophe Tetrel
- Area^{1}: 10.02 km^{2} (3.87 sq mi)
- Elevation: 130 m (430 ft)
- Highest elevation: 148 m (486 ft)
- Lowest elevation: 30 m (98 ft)
- Population (2023): 2,074
  - Density: 207.0/km^{2} (536.1/sq mi)
- Time zone: UTC+01:00 (CET)
  - Summer (DST): UTC+02:00 (CEST)
- INSEE/Postal code: 76281 /76170
- ^{1} French Land Register data, which excludes lakes, ponds, glaciers > 1 km^{2} (0.386 sq mi or 247 acres) and river estuaries.

La Frénaye is a commune in the Seine-Maritime department in the Normandy region in northern France.

== Geography ==
A village of forestry and farming in the Pays de Caux, some 20 miles (32 km) east of Le Havre, at the junction of the D484 and D982 roads.

== History ==
The village is located on an old Roman road which runs from "Juliobona" (Lillebonne) to "Rotomagus" (Rouen). Another Roman road linking "Breviodurum" (Brionne) to "Mediolanum" (Évreux), also crosses La Frenaye's borders.
The name comes from the Latin fracsinus, meaning "place of the ash trees".
The Gallo-Roman period is often mentioned in the history of the region, many relics having been found in excavations and having discovered the foundations of two military camps protecting the Roman roads. A farm still operates to this day, bearing the name of Lionnière, supposedly used to keep the lions and other wild animals during the celebrations organised in the amphitheatre at Lillebonne.
The 1 August 1914 saw the mobilisation of 60 men of the village. 30 were killed and five were missing by the end of World War I. In 1939, soldiers were again mobilised. In 1940 the exodus of Frenaysiens reached its peak, with rumours of German atrocities. During this period many Frenaysien soldiers were imprisoned in Germany or were requisitioned for compulsory labour. During the night of 7 August 1944, a Royal Air Force Lancaster crashed in La Frenaye. Three British airmen were killed and now rest in La Frenaye cemetery. On 30 August 1944 the Germans left La Frenaye.

== Population ==
Historical population
Year	Pop.	±% p.a.
1968	709	—
1975	1,080	+6.20%
1982	1,210	+1.64%
1990	1,536	+3.03%
1999	1,566	+0.22%
2007	1,779	+1.61%
2012	2,032	+2.70%
2017	2,134	+0.98%
2023	2,074	−0.47%
Source: INSEE

== Places of interest ==
- The church of St. Jacques, dating from the sixteenth century.
- The chateau de Freneuse.
- An ancient manorhouse.

== Twin towns ==
South Wonston in Hampshire, England. Rettenberg in Bavaria, Germany

== See also ==
- Communes of the Seine-Maritime department
