= Canton of Port-Jérôme-sur-Seine =

Coordinates: 49.49°N 0.57°E

- Canton
- Situation of the canton of Port-Jérôme-sur-Seine in the department of Seine-Maritime
- Country: France
- Region: Normandy
- Department: Seine-Maritime
- No. of communes: {{{nbcomm}}}
- Population (2023): 31,302
- INSEE code: 7625

The canton of Port-Jérôme-sur-Seine (before March 2020: canton of Notre-Dame-de-Gravenchon) is an administrative division of the Seine-Maritime department, in northern France. It was created at the French canton reorganisation which came into effect in March 2015. Its seat is in Port-Jérôme-sur-Seine.

It consists of the following communes:

1. Anquetierville
2. Arelaune-en-Seine
3. Bolleville
4. La Frénaye
5. Grand-Camp
6. Heurteauville
7. Lintot
8. Louvetot
9. Maulévrier-Sainte-Gertrude
10. Norville
11. Notre-Dame-de-Bliquetuit
12. Petiville
13. Port-Jérôme-sur-Seine
14. Rives-en-Seine
15. Saint-Arnoult
16. Saint-Aubin-de-Crétot
17. Saint-Gilles-de-Crétot
18. Saint-Maurice-d'Ételan
19. Saint-Nicolas-de-la-Haie
20. Trouville-Alliquerville
21. Vatteville-la-Rue
