= Saint-Aubin-Routot =

- Commune
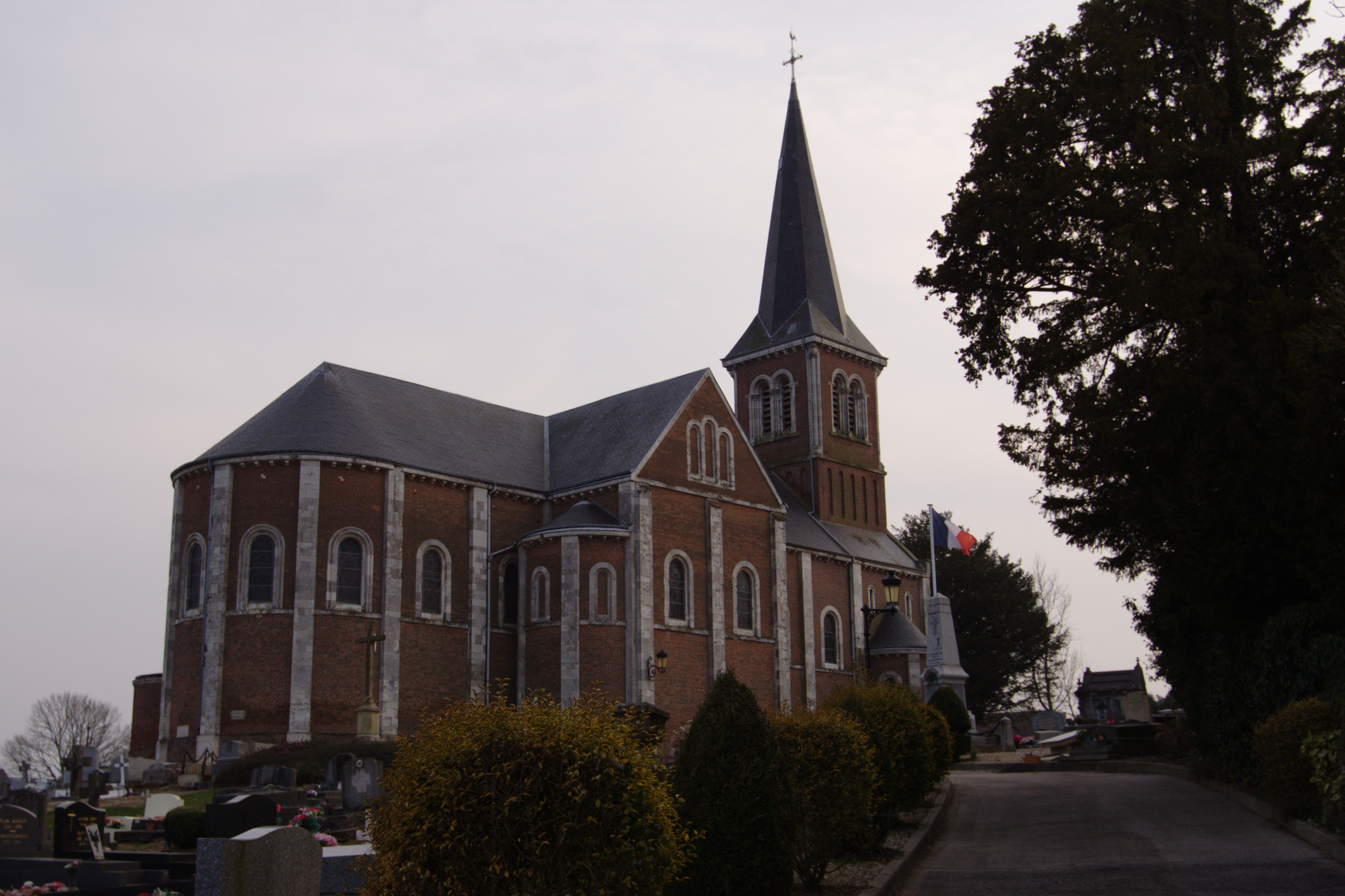
- The church in Saint-Aubin-Routot

- Coat of arms
- Location of Saint-Aubin-Routot
- Location within France Location within Normandy
- Coordinates: 49°31′26″N 0°19′36″E
- Country: France
- Region: Normandy
- Department: Seine-Maritime
- Arrondissement: Le Havre
- Canton: Saint-Romain-de-Colbosc
- Intercommunality: Le Havre Seine Métropole

Government
  - Mayor (2026–32): Anthony Guérout
- Area^{1}: 6.63 km^{2} (2.56 sq mi)
- Elevation: 110 m (360 ft)
- Highest elevation: 122 m (400 ft)
- Lowest elevation: 19 m (62 ft)
- Population (2023): 1,972
  - Density: 297/km^{2} (770/sq mi)
- Time zone: UTC+01:00 (CET)
  - Summer (DST): UTC+02:00 (CEST)
- INSEE/Postal code: 76563 /76430
- ^{1} French Land Register data, which excludes lakes, ponds, glaciers > 1 km^{2} (0.386 sq mi or 247 acres) and river estuaries.

Saint-Aubin-Routot (French pronunciation: [sɛ̃.t‿obɛ̃ ʁuto]) is a commune in the Seine-Maritime department in the Normandy region in northern France.

== Geography ==
It is a farming village in the Pays de Caux, situated some 12 miles (19 km) east of Le Havre, on the D01515 road, in the valley of the Bolbec river.

== Heraldry ==
Arms of Saint-Aubin-Routot	The arms of Saint-Aubin-Routot are blazoned : Vert, a dove holding in its beak an olive branch argent, and on a chief Or, 3 roses gules.

== Population ==
Historical population
Year	Pop.	±% p.a.
1968	646	—
1975	941	+5.52%
1982	1,015	+1.09%
1990	1,077	+0.74%
1999	1,118	+0.42%
2007	1,264	+1.55%
2012	1,902	+8.52%
2017	1,900	−0.02%
2023	1,972	+0.62%
Source: INSEE

== Places of interest ==
- The church of St. Aubin, dating from the nineteenth century.
- The 700-year-old yewtree by the church.

== See also ==
- Communes of the Seine-Maritime department
