= Saint-Antoine-la-Forêt =

- Commune
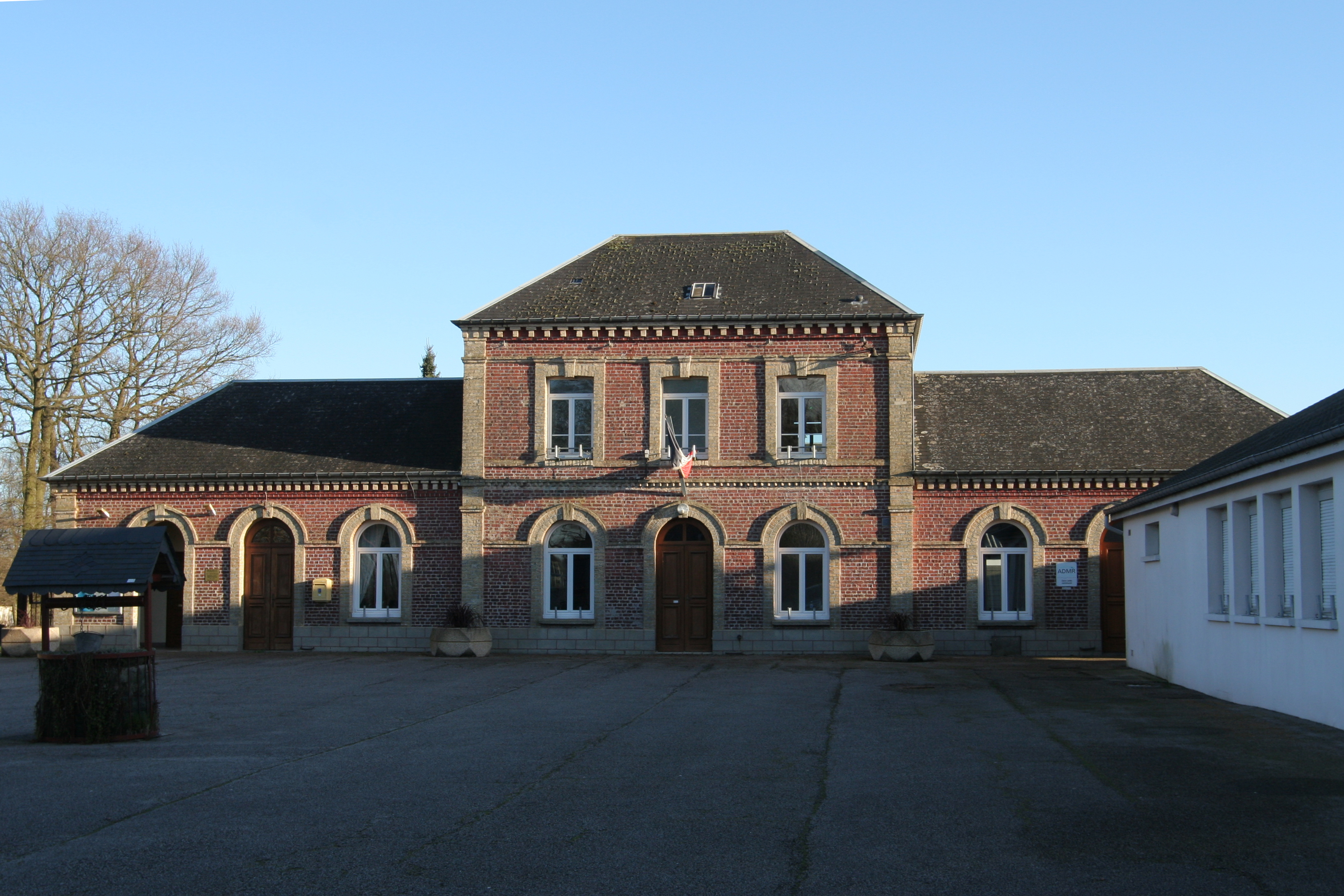
- The town hall in Saint-Antoine-la-Forêt

- Coat of arms
- Location of Saint-Antoine-la-Forêt
- Location within France Location within Normandy
- Coordinates: 49°32′17″N 0°28′21″E
- Country: France
- Region: Normandy
- Department: Seine-Maritime
- Arrondissement: Le Havre
- Canton: Bolbec
- Intercommunality: Caux Seine Agglo

Government
  - Mayor (2026–32): Thierry Debray
- Area^{1}: 6.44 km^{2} (2.49 sq mi)
- Elevation: 135 m (443 ft)
- Highest elevation: 137 m (449 ft)
- Lowest elevation: 10 m (33 ft)
- Population (2023): 1,105
  - Density: 172/km^{2} (444/sq mi)
- Time zone: UTC+01:00 (CET)
  - Summer (DST): UTC+02:00 (CEST)
- INSEE/Postal code: 76556 /76170
- ^{1} French Land Register data, which excludes lakes, ponds, glaciers > 1 km^{2} (0.386 sq mi or 247 acres) and river estuaries.

Saint-Antoine-la-Forêt (French pronunciation: [sɛ̃.t‿ɑ̃twan la fɔʁɛ]) is a commune in the Seine-Maritime department in the Normandy region in northern France.

== Geography ==
A farming village in the Pays de Caux, situated some 18 miles (29 km) east of Le Havre, at the junction of the D34 and D17 roads, in the valley of the Bolbec river.

== Heraldry ==
Arms of Saint-Antoine-la-Forêt	The arms of Saint-Antoine-la-Forêt are blazoned : Or, on a fess indented azure between 2 angennes and a cross moline gules, a demi-lion issuant from the base of the fess argent. The coat of arms of the commune was officially adopted in 2000

== Population ==
Historical population
Year	Pop.	±% p.a.
1968	515	—
1975	530	+0.41%
1982	749	+5.06%
1990	902	+2.35%
1999	935	+0.40%
2007	992	+0.74%
2012	1,032	+0.79%
2017	1,079	+0.89%
2023	1,105	+0.40%
Source: INSEE

== Places of interest ==
- The church of St. Antoine, dating from the twelfth century.
- The manorhouse at Les Côtières.

== See also ==
- Communes of the Seine-Maritime department
