= Saint-Eustache-la-Forêt =

- Commune
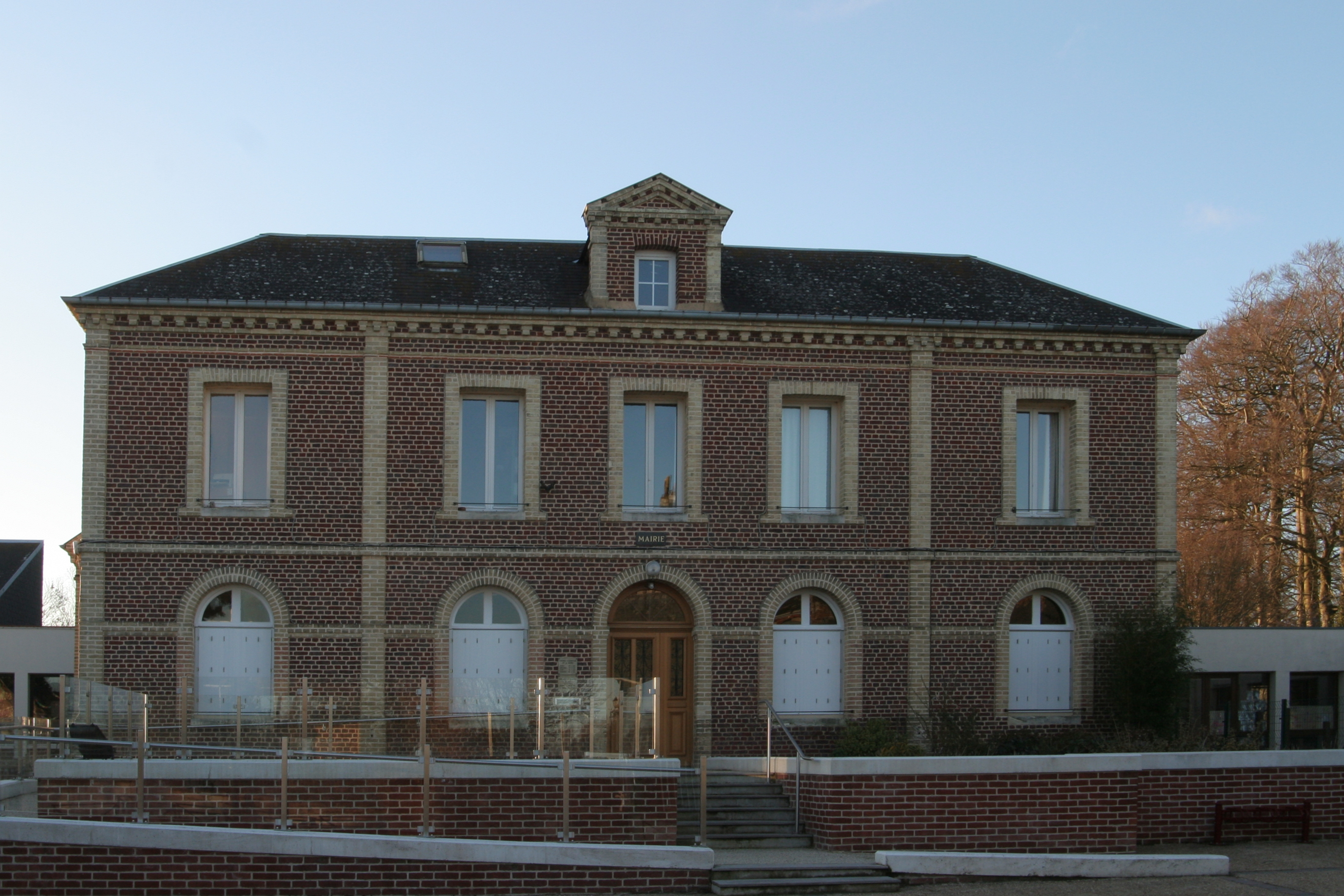
- The town hall in Saint-Eustache-la-Forêt
- Location of Saint-Eustache-la-Forêt
- Location within France Location within Normandy
- Coordinates: 49°33′09″N 0°27′06″E
- Country: France
- Region: Normandy
- Department: Seine-Maritime
- Arrondissement: Le Havre
- Canton: Bolbec
- Intercommunality: Caux Seine Agglo

Government
  - Mayor (2020–2026): Hubert Lecarpentier
- Area^{1}: 6.59 km^{2} (2.54 sq mi)
- Elevation: 85 m (279 ft)
- Highest elevation: 136 m (446 ft)
- Lowest elevation: 40 m (130 ft)
- Population (2023): 1,194
  - Density: 181/km^{2} (469/sq mi)
- Time zone: UTC+01:00 (CET)
  - Summer (DST): UTC+02:00 (CEST)
- INSEE/Postal code: 76576 /76210
- ^{1} French Land Register data, which excludes lakes, ponds, glaciers > 1 km^{2} (0.386 sq mi or 247 acres) and river estuaries.

Saint-Eustache-la-Forêt (French pronunciation: [sɛ̃t‿østaʃ la fɔʁɛ]) is a commune in the Seine-Maritime department in the Normandy region in northern France.

== Geography ==
A farming village in the Pays de Caux, situated some 13 miles (21 km) east of Le Havre, at the junction of the D9015 and D910 roads, in the valley of the Bolbec river.

== Population ==
Historical population
Year	Pop.	±% p.a.
1968	739	—
1975	1,178	+6.89%
1982	1,184	+0.07%
1990	1,217	+0.34%
1999	1,180	−0.34%
2007	1,094	−0.94%
2012	1,058	−0.67%
2017	1,146	+1.61%
2023	1,194	+0.69%
Source: INSEE

== Places of interest ==
- The sixteenth-century houses.
- The church dating from the thirteenth century.
- The seventeenth-century château du Val-d'Arques.

== See also ==
- Communes of the Seine-Maritime department
