= La Trinité-du-Mont =

- Commune
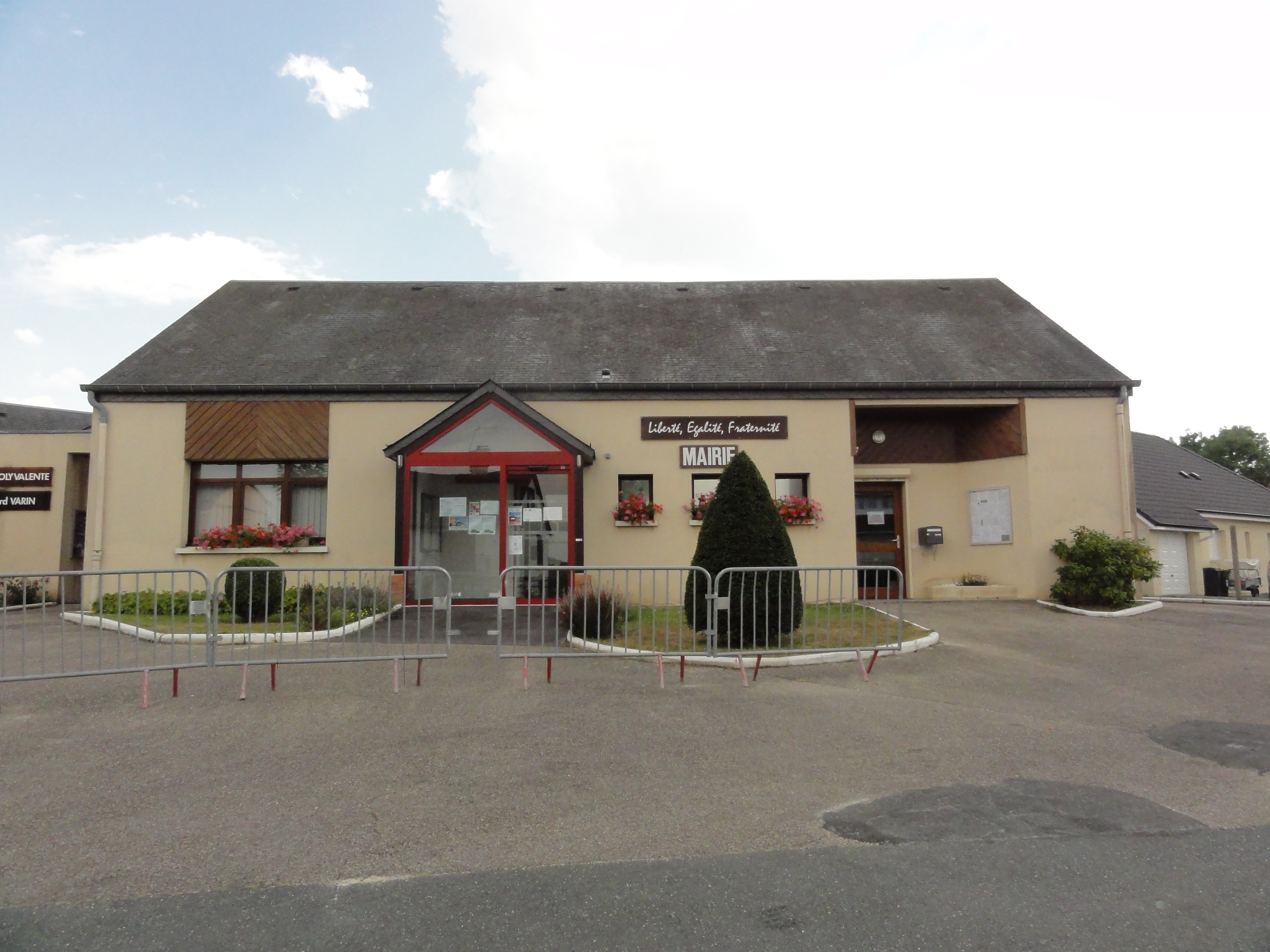
- La Trinité-du-Mont Town hall

- Coat of arms
- Location of La Trinité-du-Mont
- Location within France Location within Normandy
- Coordinates: 49°32′41″N 0°33′24″E
- Country: France
- Region: Normandy
- Department: Seine-Maritime
- Arrondissement: Le Havre
- Canton: Bolbec
- Intercommunality: Caux Seine Agglo

Government
  - Mayor (2020–2026): Hugues Duflo
- Area^{1}: 2.06 km^{2} (0.80 sq mi)
- Elevation: 134 m (440 ft)
- Highest elevation: 146 m (479 ft)
- Lowest elevation: 37 m (121 ft)
- Population (2023): 951
  - Density: 462/km^{2} (1,200/sq mi)
- Time zone: UTC+01:00 (CET)
  - Summer (DST): UTC+02:00 (CEST)
- INSEE/Postal code: 76712 /76170
- ^{1} French Land Register data, which excludes lakes, ponds, glaciers > 1 km^{2} (0.386 sq mi or 247 acres) and river estuaries.

La Trinité-du-Mont (French pronunciation: [la tʁinite dy mɔ̃]) is a commune in the Seine-Maritime department in the Normandy region in northern France.

== Geography ==
A farming village surrounded by woodland in the Pays de Caux, some 22 miles (35 km) east of Le Havre, on the D34 road, just north of Lillebonne.

== Population ==
Historical population
Year	Pop.	±% p.a.
1968	390	—
1975	544	+4.87%
1982	601	+1.43%
1990	637	+0.73%
1999	629	−0.14%
2007	743	+2.10%
2012	758	+0.40%
2017	798	+1.03%
2023	951	+2.97%
Source: INSEE

== Places of interest ==
- The church of the Holy Trinity, dating from the twelfth century.

== See also ==
- Communes of the Seine-Maritime department
