= Canton of Bolbec =

Coordinates: 49°35′07″N 0°29′24″E

Bolbec
- Canton for the Departmental Council of Seine-Maritime
- Situation of the canton of Bolbec in the department
- Department: Seine-Maritime
- Population: 38,698 (2023)
- Electorate: 26,137 (2024)
- Major settlements: Bolbec

Current Canton
- Created: 2015
- Members: Dominique Metot (DVG); Murielle Moutier Lecerf (DVG)
- Seats: Two

The canton of Bolbec is an electoral district of the Seine-Maritime department, in northern France. It elects two departmental councillors sitting in the Departmental Council of Seine-Maritime. Its seat is in Bolbec.

== Geography ==
An area of farming, quarrying and light industry in the arrondissement of Le Havre, centred on the town of Bolbec. The altitude varies from 12m (Gruchet-le-Valasse) to 154m (Beuzevillette) for an average altitude of 118m.

== Composition ==
At the French canton reorganisation which came into effect in March 2015, the canton was expanded from 16 to 20 communes:

- Bernières
- Beuzeville-la-Grenier
- Beuzevillette
- Bolbec
- Gruchet-le-Valasse
- Lanquetot
- Lillebonne
- Mélamare
- Mirville
- Nointot
- Parc-d'Anxtot
- Raffetot
- Rouville
- Saint-Antoine-la-Forêt
- Saint-Eustache-la-Forêt
- Saint-Jean-de-Folleville
- Saint-Jean-de-la-Neuville
- Saint-Nicolas-de-la-Taille
- Tancarville
- La Trinité-du-Mont

== Population ==
Historical population
Year	Pop.	±% p.a.
2013	38,487	—
2018	38,988	+0.26%
2023	38,698	−0.15%
Source: INSEE

== Councillors ==
Election	Member	Party	Elected offices
2015	Dominique Metot	DVG	Mayor of Bolbec until 2020
2015	Murielle Moutier Lecerf	DVG	
2021	Dominique Metot	DVG	Incumbent departmental counseilor Municipal councillor for Bolbec
2021	Murielle Moutier Lecerf	DVG	Incumbent departmental councillor

== See also ==
- Arrondissements of the Seine-Maritime department
- Cantons of the Seine-Maritime department
- Communes of the Seine-Maritime department
