= Rouville, Seine-Maritime =

Rouville
- Commune
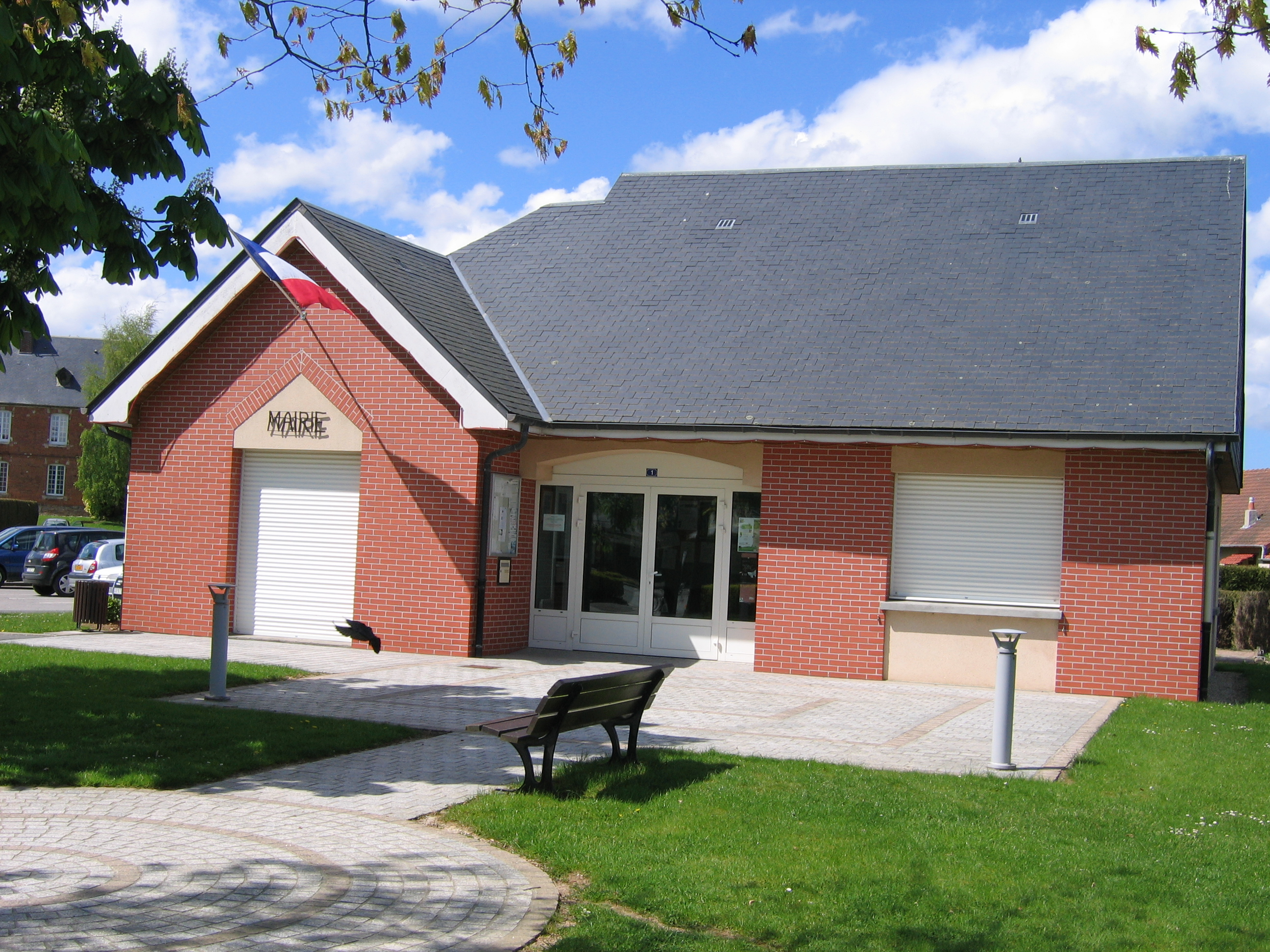
- The town hall in Rouville

- Coat of arms
- Location of Rouville
- Location within France Location within Normandy
- Coordinates: 49°36′57″N 0°30′00″E
- Country: France
- Region: Normandy
- Department: Seine-Maritime
- Arrondissement: Le Havre
- Canton: Bolbec
- Intercommunality: Caux Seine Agglo

Government
  - Mayor (2026–32): Marc Beauchemin
- Area^{1}: 9.55 km^{2} (3.69 sq mi)
- Elevation: 130 m (430 ft)
- Highest elevation: 143 m (469 ft)
- Lowest elevation: 109 m (358 ft)
- Population (2023): 613
  - Density: 64.2/km^{2} (166/sq mi)
- Time zone: UTC+01:00 (CET)
  - Summer (DST): UTC+02:00 (CEST)
- INSEE/Postal code: 76543 /76210
- ^{1} French Land Register data, which excludes lakes, ponds, glaciers > 1 km^{2} (0.386 sq mi or 247 acres) and river estuaries.

Rouville (French pronunciation: [ʁuvil]) is a commune in the Seine-Maritime department in the Normandy region in northern France.

== Geography ==
A farming village in the Pays de Caux, situated some 21 miles (34 km) northeast of Le Havre, at the junction of the D17, D52 and D149 roads. The A29 autoroute follows the southern border of the commune.

== Population ==
Historical population
Year	Pop.	±% p.a.
1968	377	—
1975	358	−0.74%
1982	392	+1.30%
1990	471	+2.32%
1999	508	+0.84%
2007	554	+1.09%
2012	610	+1.94%
2017	617	+0.23%
2023	613	−0.11%
Source: INSEE

== Places of interest ==
- The church of St. Hermes, with parts dating from the eleventh century.
- The church of St. Pierre, also dating from the eleventh century.
- A seventeenth century manorhouse.
- The chapel of Notre Dame at Bielleville.

== See also ==
- Communes of the Seine-Maritime department
