= Saint-Jean-de-Folleville =

- Commune
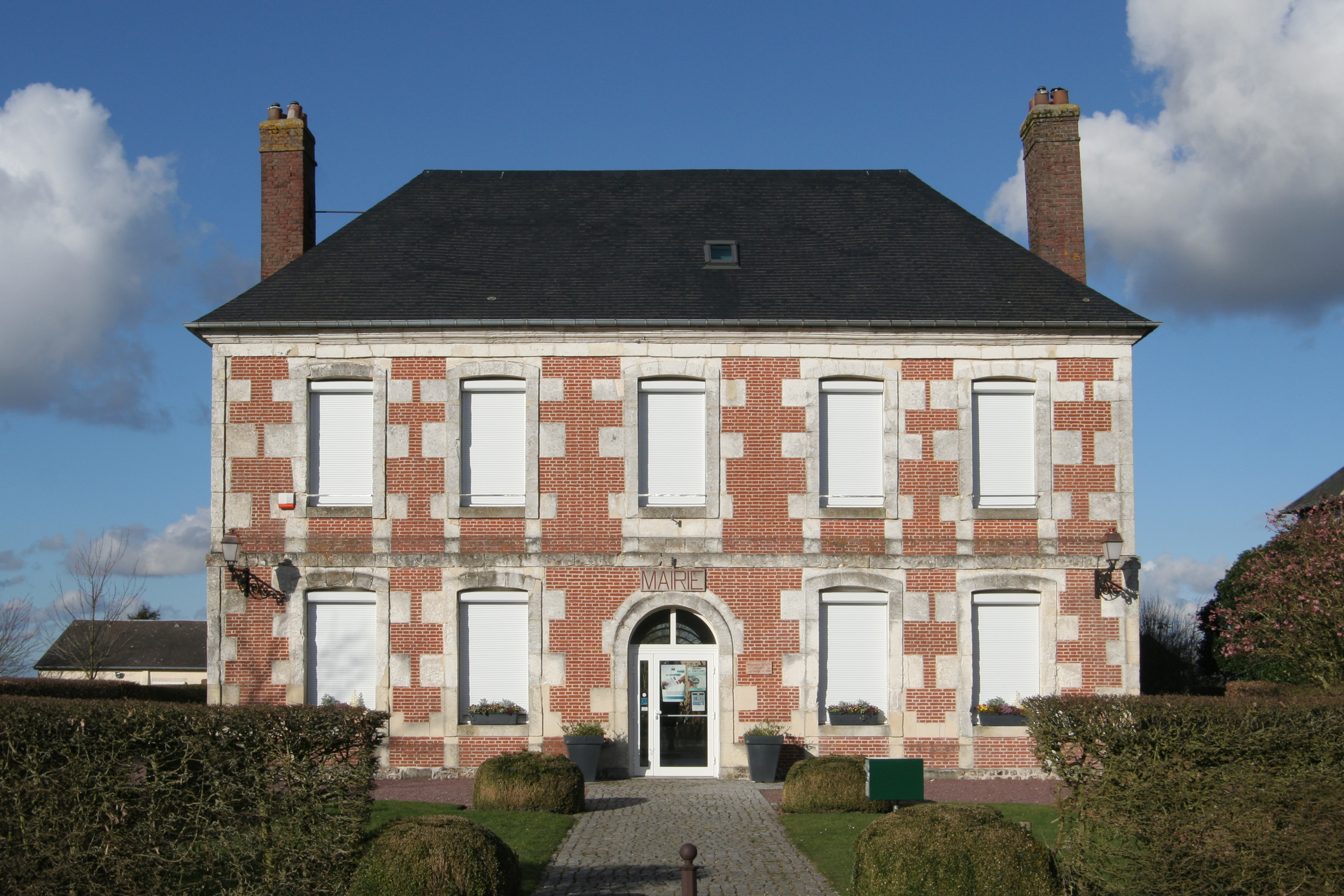
- The town hall in Saint-Jean-de-Folleville
- Location of Saint-Jean-de-Folleville
- Location within France Location within Normandy
- Coordinates: 49°31′29″N 0°30′24″E
- Country: France
- Region: Normandy
- Department: Seine-Maritime
- Arrondissement: Le Havre
- Canton: Bolbec
- Intercommunality: Caux Seine Agglo

Government
  - Mayor (2020–2026): Patrick Pesquet
- Area^{1}: 13.73 km^{2} (5.30 sq mi)
- Elevation: 133 m (436 ft)
- Highest elevation: 134 m (440 ft)
- Lowest elevation: 0 m (0 ft)
- Population (2023): 785
  - Density: 57.2/km^{2} (148/sq mi)
- Time zone: UTC+01:00 (CET)
  - Summer (DST): UTC+02:00 (CEST)
- INSEE/Postal code: 76592 /76170
- ^{1} French Land Register data, which excludes lakes, ponds, glaciers > 1 km^{2} (0.386 sq mi or 247 acres) and river estuaries.

Saint-Jean-de-Folleville (French pronunciation: [sɛ̃ ʒɑ̃ də fɔlvil]) is a commune in the Seine-Maritime department in the Normandy region in northern France.

== Geography ==
A farming village in the Pays de Caux, situated some 19 miles (31 km) east of Le Havre, at the junction of the D81 and D982 roads. The river Seine marks the southern border of the commune.

== Population ==
Historical population
Year	Pop.	±% p.a.
1968	586	—
1975	622	+0.86%
1982	599	−0.54%
1990	731	+2.52%
1999	742	+0.17%
2007	828	+1.38%
2012	834	+0.14%
2017	827	−0.17%
2023	785	−0.86%
Source: INSEE

== Places of interest ==
- The church of St. Jean, dating from the thirteenth century.
- The church of Notre-Dame, in the village of Radicatel, dating from the sixteenth century.
- The eighteenth-century farmhouse de Gouberville, once owned by the father of Charlotte Corday.

== See also ==
- Communes of the Seine-Maritime department
