= Nointot =

- Commune
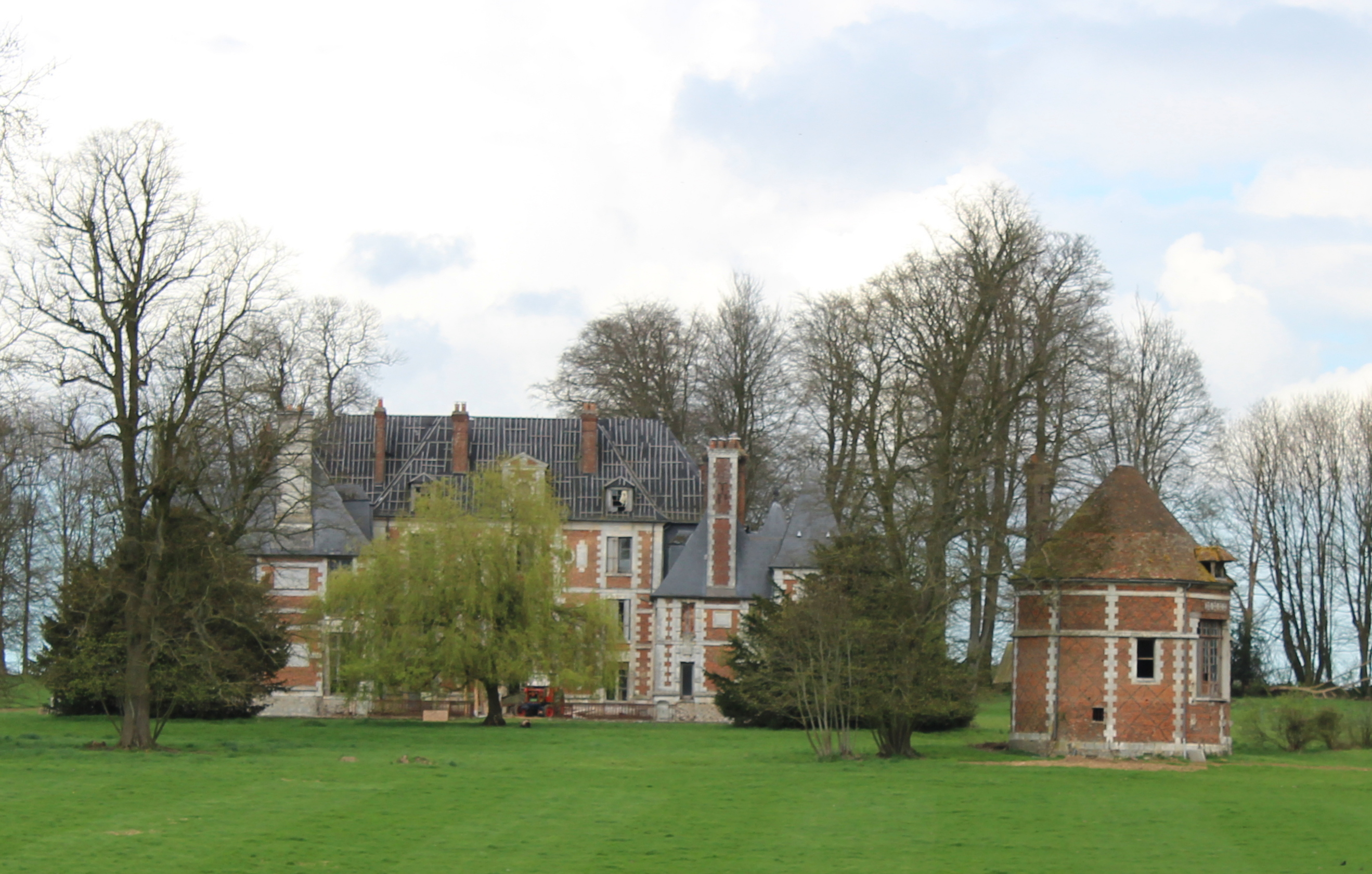
- The chateau of Baclair in Nointot
- Location of Nointot
- Location within France Location within Normandy
- Coordinates: 49°35′56″N 0°28′41″E
- Country: France
- Region: Normandy
- Department: Seine-Maritime
- Arrondissement: Le Havre
- Canton: Bolbec
- Intercommunality: Caux Seine Agglo

Government
  - Mayor (2026–32): Manuel Herrero
- Area^{1}: 6 km^{2} (2.3 sq mi)
- Elevation: 129 m (423 ft)
- Highest elevation: 144 m (472 ft)
- Lowest elevation: 65 m (213 ft)
- Population (2023): 1,358
  - Density: 230/km^{2} (590/sq mi)
- Time zone: UTC+01:00 (CET)
  - Summer (DST): UTC+02:00 (CEST)
- INSEE/Postal code: 76468 /76210
- ^{1} French Land Register data, which excludes lakes, ponds, glaciers > 1 km^{2} (0.386 sq mi or 247 acres) and river estuaries.

Nointot (French pronunciation: [nwɛ̃to]) is a commune in the Seine-Maritime department in the Normandy region in northern France.

== Geography ==
A farming town in the Pays de Caux, situated some 15 miles (24 km) northeast of Le Havre, near the junction of the D73 and D73a roads. The A29 autoroute passes through the northern part of the commune. The village is served by SNCF, having a TER railway station here.

== Population ==
Historical population
Year	Pop.	±% p.a.
1968	723	—
1975	931	+3.68%
1982	980	+0.74%
1990	1,037	+0.71%
1999	1,056	+0.20%
2007	1,245	+2.08%
2012	1,435	+2.88%
2017	1,346	−1.27%
2023	1,358	+0.15%
Source: INSEE

== Places of interest ==
- Two chateaux.
- The church of St. Sauveur, dating from the eighteenth century.
- A railway viaduct built in 1844: 524m in length with 49 arches up to 35m high.

== See also ==
- Communes of the Seine-Maritime department
