= Beuzevillette =

- Commune
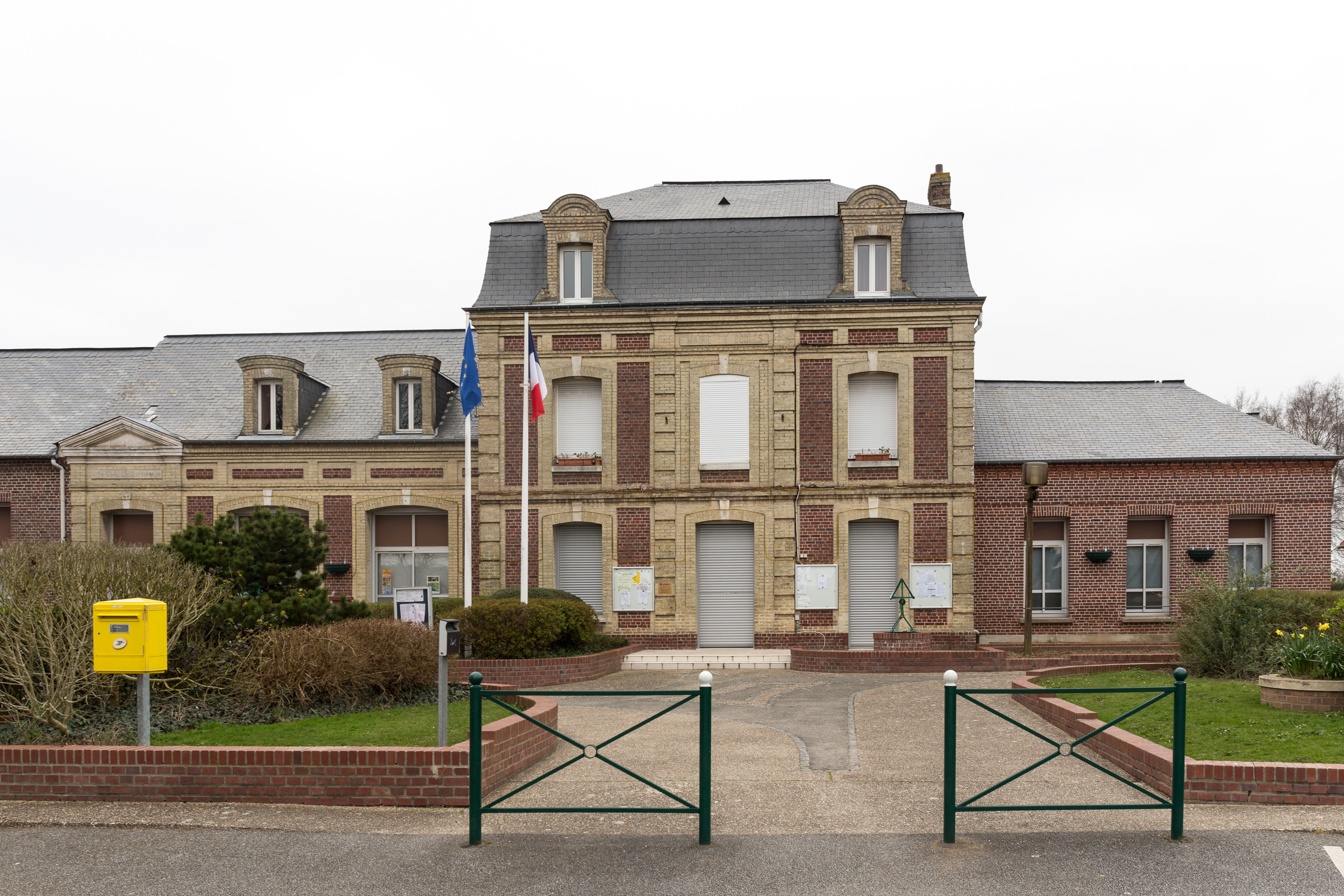
- The town hall and school in Beuzevillette

- Coat of arms
- Location of Beuzevillette
- Location within France Location within Normandy
- Coordinates: 49°34′22″N 0°32′13″E
- Country: France
- Region: Normandy
- Department: Seine-Maritime
- Arrondissement: Le Havre
- Canton: Bolbec
- Intercommunality: Caux Seine Agglo

Government
  - Mayor (2026–32): Yan Bastida
- Area^{1}: 5.63 km^{2} (2.17 sq mi)
- Elevation: 156 m (512 ft)
- Highest elevation: 154 m (505 ft)
- Lowest elevation: 56 m (184 ft)
- Population (2023): 606
  - Density: 108/km^{2} (279/sq mi)
- Time zone: UTC+01:00 (CET)
  - Summer (DST): UTC+02:00 (CEST)
- INSEE/Postal code: 76092 /76210
- ^{1} French Land Register data, which excludes lakes, ponds, glaciers > 1 km^{2} (0.386 sq mi or 247 acres) and river estuaries.

Beuzevillette (French pronunciation: [bøzvilɛt]) is a commune in the Seine-Maritime department in the Normandy region in northern France.

== Heraldry ==
Arms of Beuzevillette	The arms of Beuzevillette are blazoned : Argent, on a cross between in bend 2 (trefoil surmounted by a cross of Calvary of 2 steps) and in bend sinister 2 ermine spots gules, an alerion Or.

== Geography ==
A farming village situated in the Pays de Caux, surrounded by woodland, some 16 miles (26 km) northeast of Le Havre, just off the D30 road.

== Population ==
Historical population
Year	Pop.	±% p.a.
1968	590	—
1975	624	+0.80%
1982	687	+1.38%
1990	717	+0.54%
1999	650	−1.08%
2007	705	+1.02%
2012	689	−0.46%
2017	647	−1.25%
2023	606	−1.09%
Source: INSEE

== Places of interest ==
- The church of St. Aubin, dating from the twelfth century.
- A thirteenth-century stone cross.

== See also ==
- Communes of the Seine-Maritime department
