= Parc-d'Anxtot =

Parc-d’Anxtot
- Commune
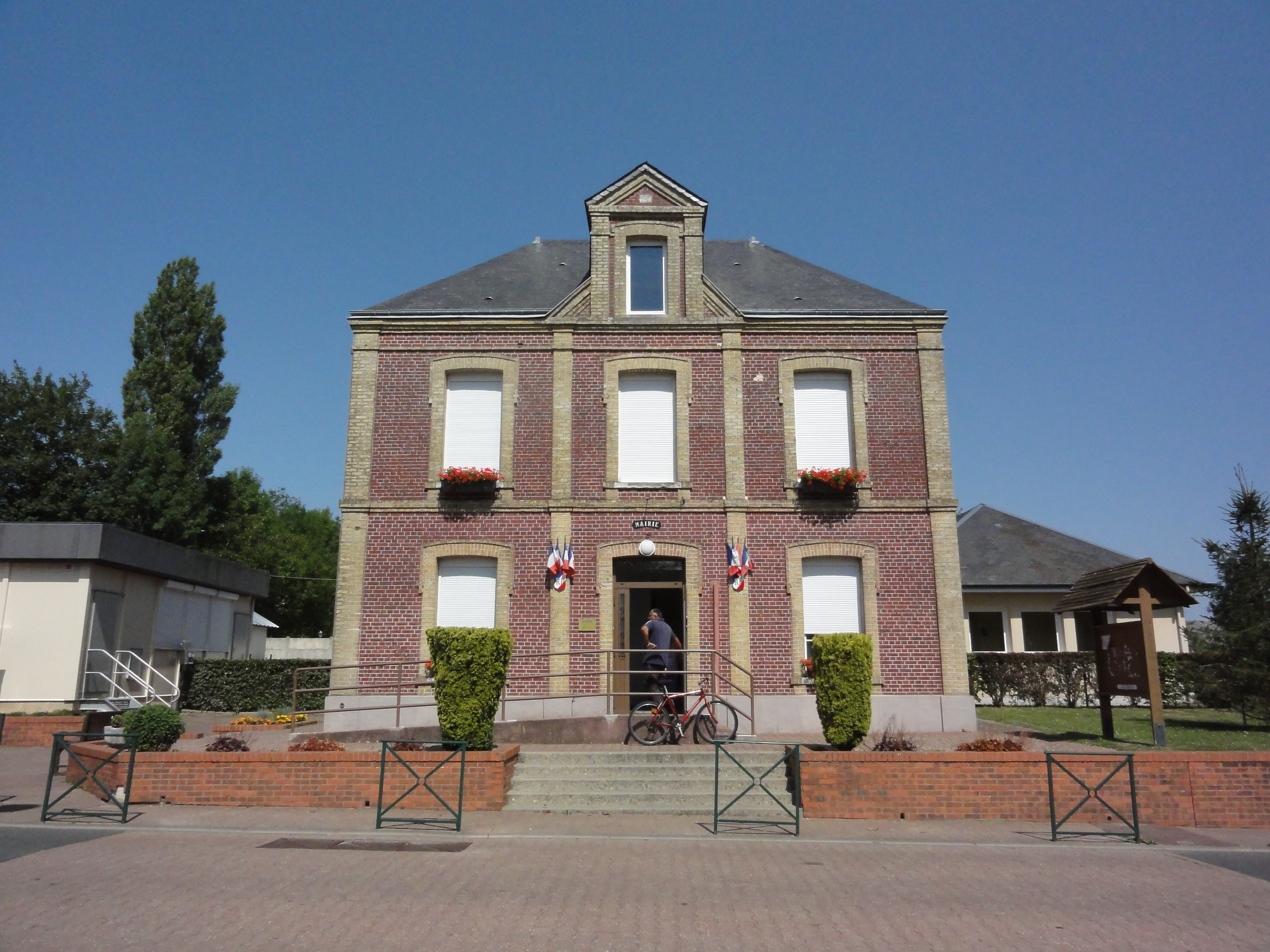
- Town hall
- Location of Parc-d’Anxtot
- Location within France Location within Normandy
- Coordinates: 49°34′57″N 0°23′27″E
- Country: France
- Region: Normandy
- Department: Seine-Maritime
- Arrondissement: Le Havre
- Canton: Bolbec
- Intercommunality: Caux Seine Agglo
- Area^{1}: 5.83 km^{2} (2.25 sq mi)
- Elevation: 114 m (374 ft)
- Highest elevation: 130 m (430 ft)
- Lowest elevation: 82 m (269 ft)
- Population (2023): 587
  - Density: 101/km^{2} (261/sq mi)
- Time zone: UTC+01:00 (CET)
  - Summer (DST): UTC+02:00 (CEST)
- INSEE/Postal code: 76494 /76210
- ^{1} French Land Register data, which excludes lakes, ponds, glaciers > 1 km^{2} (0.386 sq mi or 247 acres) and river estuaries.

Parc-d’Anxtot is a commune in the Seine-Maritime department in the Normandy region in northern France.

== Geography ==
A farming village in the Pays de Caux, situated some 15 miles (24 km) northeast of Le Havre, on the D80 road. The A29 autoroute crosses the commune's southern border.

== Population ==
Historical population
Year	Pop.	±% p.a.
1968	258	—
1975	266	+0.44%
1982	302	+1.83%
1990	382	+2.98%
1999	482	+2.62%
2007	557	+1.82%
2012	585	+0.99%
2017	567	−0.62%
2023	587	+0.58%
Source: INSEE

== Places of interest ==
- The church of St. Blaise, dating from the sixteenth century.

== See also ==
- Communes of the Seine-Maritime department
