= Bernières, Seine-Maritime =

Bernières
- Commune
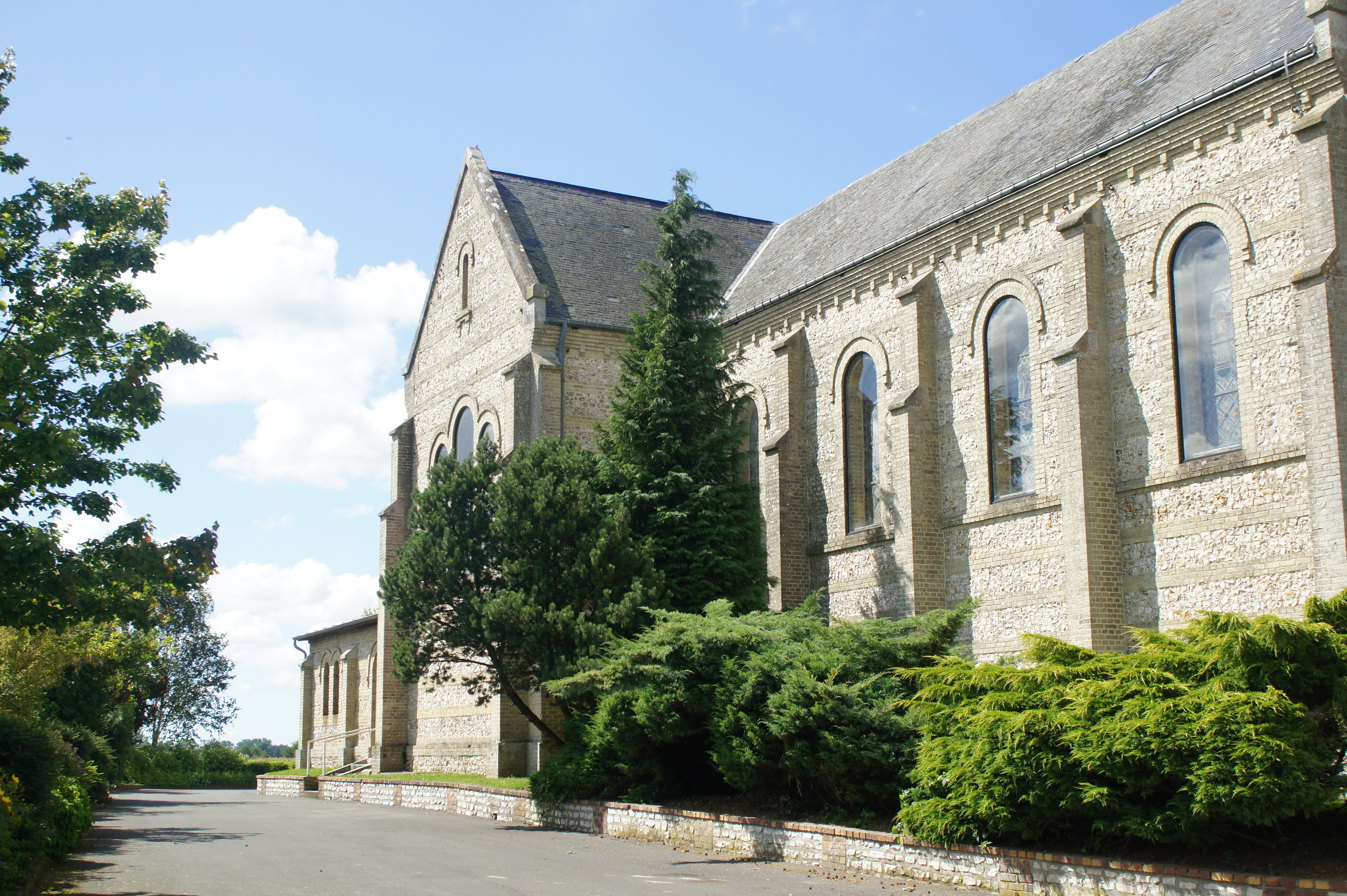
- The church in Bernières
- Location of Bernières
- Location within France Location within Normandy
- Coordinates: 49°37′16″N 0°28′43″E
- Country: France
- Region: Normandy
- Department: Seine-Maritime
- Arrondissement: Le Havre
- Canton: Bolbec
- Intercommunality: Caux Seine Agglo

Government
  - Mayor (2026–32): Jean-Yves Argentin
- Area^{1}: 6.63 km^{2} (2.56 sq mi)
- Elevation: 142 m (466 ft)
- Highest elevation: 142 m (466 ft)
- Lowest elevation: 110 m (360 ft)
- Population (2023): 639
  - Density: 96.4/km^{2} (250/sq mi)
- Time zone: UTC+01:00 (CET)
  - Summer (DST): UTC+02:00 (CEST)
- INSEE/Postal code: 76082 /76210
- ^{1} French Land Register data, which excludes lakes, ponds, glaciers > 1 km^{2} (0.386 sq mi or 247 acres) and river estuaries.

Bernières (French pronunciation: [bɛʁnjɛʁ]) is a commune in the Seine-Maritime department in the Normandy region in northern France.

== Geography ==
A farming village situated in the Pays de Caux, some 16 miles (26 km) northeast of Le Havre, at the junction of the D73 and the D52 roads. The A29 autoroute forms the commune's southern border.

== Population ==
Historical population
| Year | Pop. | ±% p.a. |
|---|---|---|
| 1968 | 471 | — |
| 1975 | 572 | +2.81% |
| 1982 | 549 | −0.58% |
| 1990 | 578 | +0.65% |
| 1999 | 544 | −0.67% |
| 2007 | 630 | +1.85% |
| 2012 | 679 | +1.51% |
| 2017 | 641 | −1.15% |
| 2023 | 639 | −0.05% |
Source: INSEE

== Places of interest ==
- The church of St.Jean-Baptiste, dating from the nineteenth century.
- A manorhouse
- The chateau of Durdan.

== See also ==
- Communes of the Seine-Maritime department
