= Saint-Nicolas-de-la-Taille =

- Commune
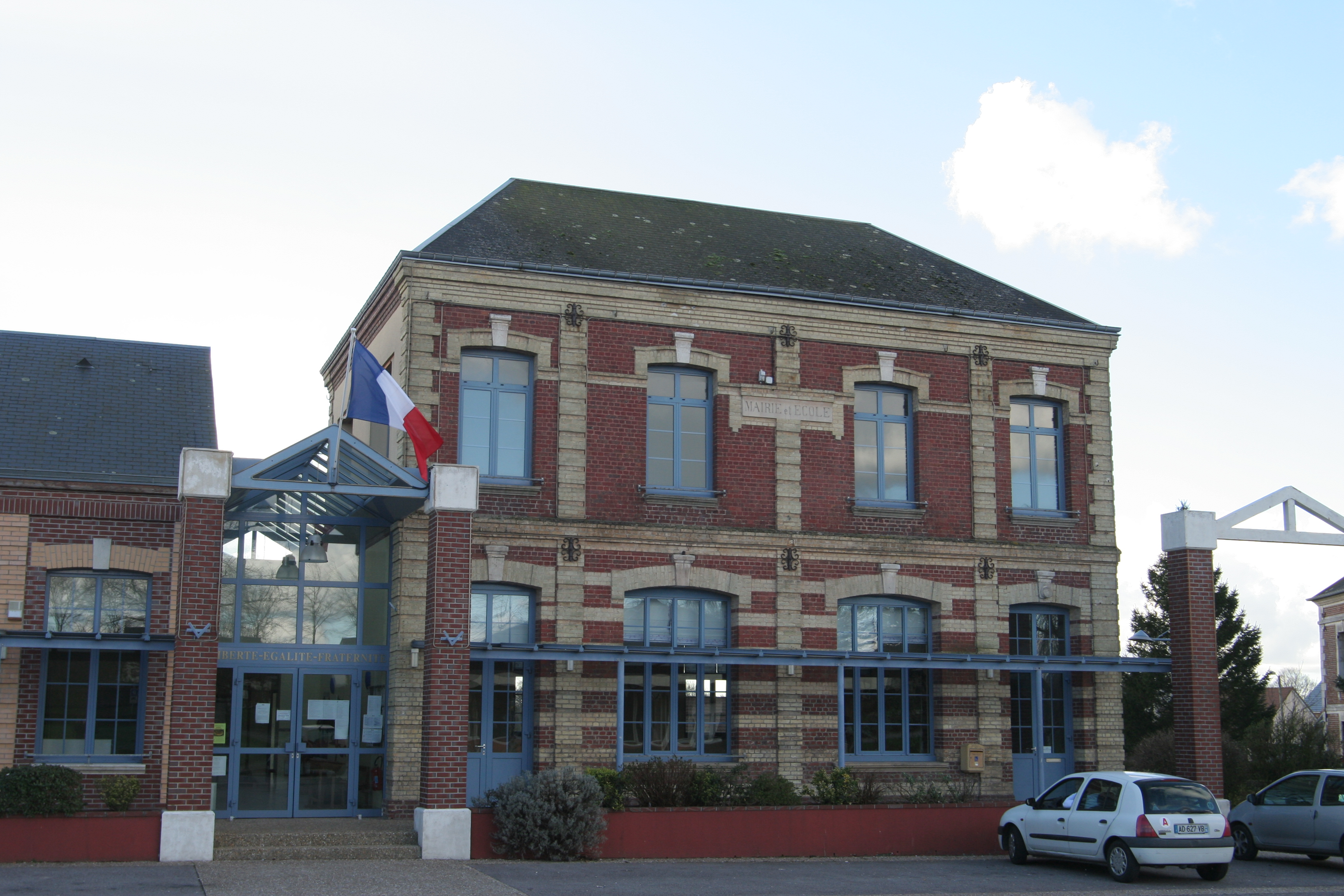
- The town hall in Saint-Nicolas-de-la-Taille
- Location of Saint-Nicolas-de-la-Taille
- Location within France Location within Normandy
- Coordinates: 49°30′43″N 0°28′29″E
- Country: France
- Region: Normandy
- Department: Seine-Maritime
- Arrondissement: Le Havre
- Canton: Bolbec
- Intercommunality: Caux Seine Agglo

Government
  - Mayor (2026–32): Michel Cavelier
- Area^{1}: 9.25 km^{2} (3.57 sq mi)
- Elevation: 112 m (367 ft)
- Highest elevation: 131 m (430 ft)
- Lowest elevation: 2 m (6.6 ft)
- Population (2023): 1,627
  - Density: 176/km^{2} (456/sq mi)
- Time zone: UTC+01:00 (CET)
  - Summer (DST): UTC+02:00 (CEST)
- INSEE/Postal code: 76627 /76170
- ^{1} French Land Register data, which excludes lakes, ponds, glaciers > 1 km^{2} (0.386 sq mi or 247 acres) and river estuaries.

Saint-Nicolas-de-la-Taille (French pronunciation: [sɛ̃ nikɔla də la taj]) is a commune in the Seine-Maritime department in the Normandy region in northern France.

== Geography ==
A forestry and farming village surrounded by woodland, in the Pays de Caux, situated some 16 miles (26 km) east of Le Havre, at the junction of the D81 and D17 roads.

== Population ==
Historical population
Year	Pop.	±% p.a.
1968	614	—
1975	760	+3.09%
1982	919	+2.75%
1990	1,029	+1.42%
1999	1,035	+0.06%
2007	1,317	+3.06%
2012	1,414	+1.43%
2017	1,572	+2.14%
2023	1,627	+0.57%
Source: INSEE

== Places of interest ==
- The church of St. Nicolas, dating from the sixteenth century.
- The fourteenth-century farmhouse of Rames.

== See also ==
- Communes of the Seine-Maritime department
