= Bolbec =

- Commune
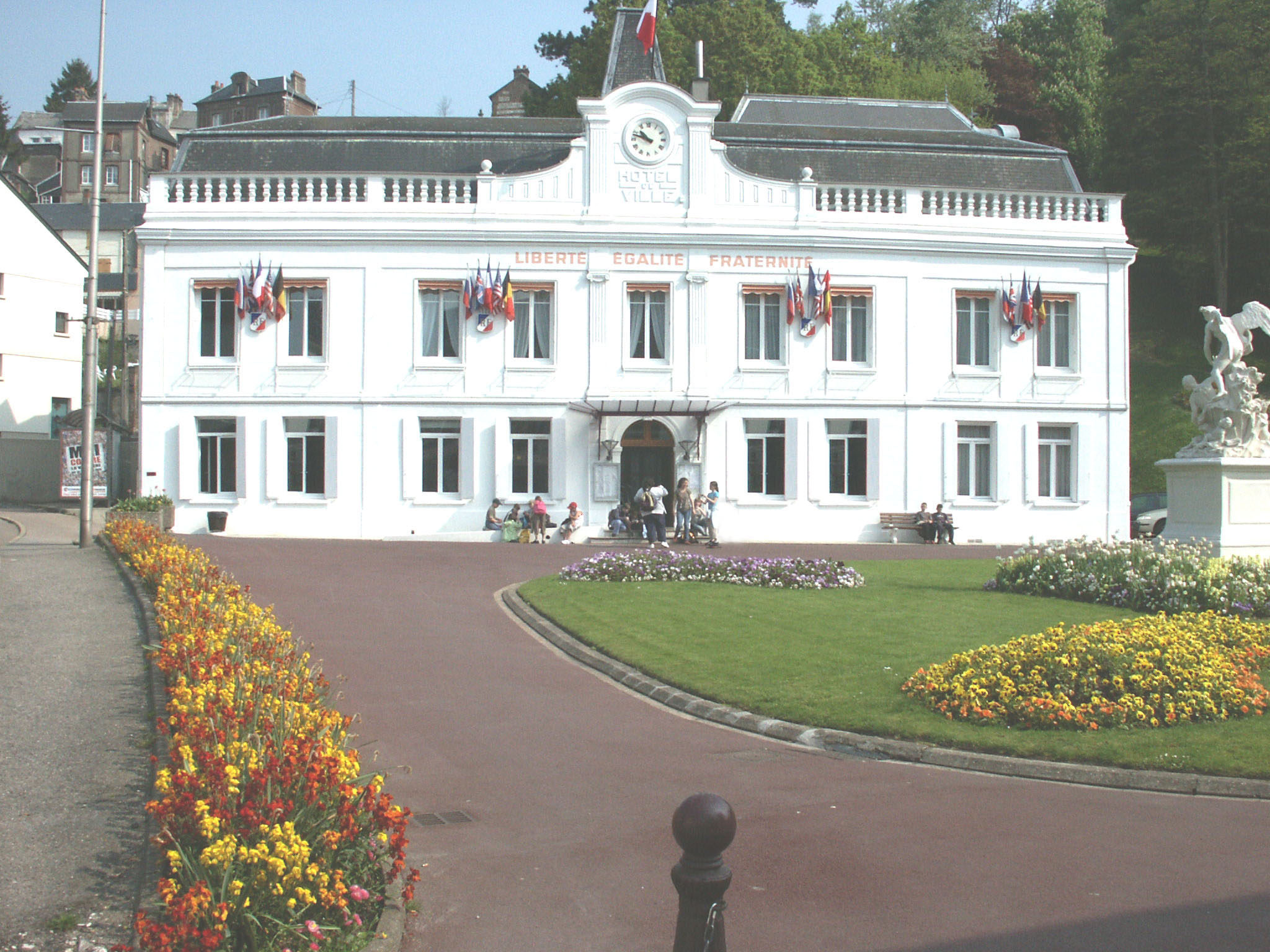
- Town hall

- Coat of arms
- Location of Bolbec
- Location within France Location within Normandy
- Coordinates: 49°34′N 0°28′E
- Country: France
- Region: Normandy
- Department: Seine-Maritime
- Arrondissement: Le Havre
- Canton: Bolbec
- Intercommunality: Caux Seine Agglo

Government
  - Mayor (2026–32): Christophe Doré
- Area^{1}: 12.24 km^{2} (4.73 sq mi)
- Elevation: 129 m (423 ft)
- Highest elevation: 142 m (466 ft)
- Lowest elevation: 29 m (95 ft)
- Population (2023): 11,590
  - Density: 946.9/km^{2} (2,452/sq mi)
- Time zone: UTC+01:00 (CET)
  - Summer (DST): UTC+02:00 (CEST)
- INSEE/Postal code: 76114 /76210
- ^{1} French Land Register data, which excludes lakes, ponds, glaciers > 1 km^{2} (0.386 sq mi or 247 acres) and river estuaries.

Bolbec (French pronunciation: [bɔlbɛk]) is a commune in the Seine-Maritime department in the Normandy region in northern France. Its inhabitants are called Bolbécais or Bolbécaises.

== Geography ==
A farming, quarrying and light industrial town situated at the heart of three valleys in the Pays de Caux, some 19 miles (31 km) northeast of Le Havre. It is the source of the river Commerce, though here it is known as the river Bolbec. The town has many small lanes (ruelles) with some pretty houses.

== History ==
The first written record of the town dates from the end of the 11th century, as Bolebec. Archeological discoveries indicate that the site has been inhabited since ancient times. The first lord of Bolbec was Osbern de Bolbec (around 992) and the last was the Duc de Charost who was executed during the French Revolution. Through the Norman family of de Bolbec, the town gives its name to the village of Swaffham Bulbeck in Cambridgeshire, England.

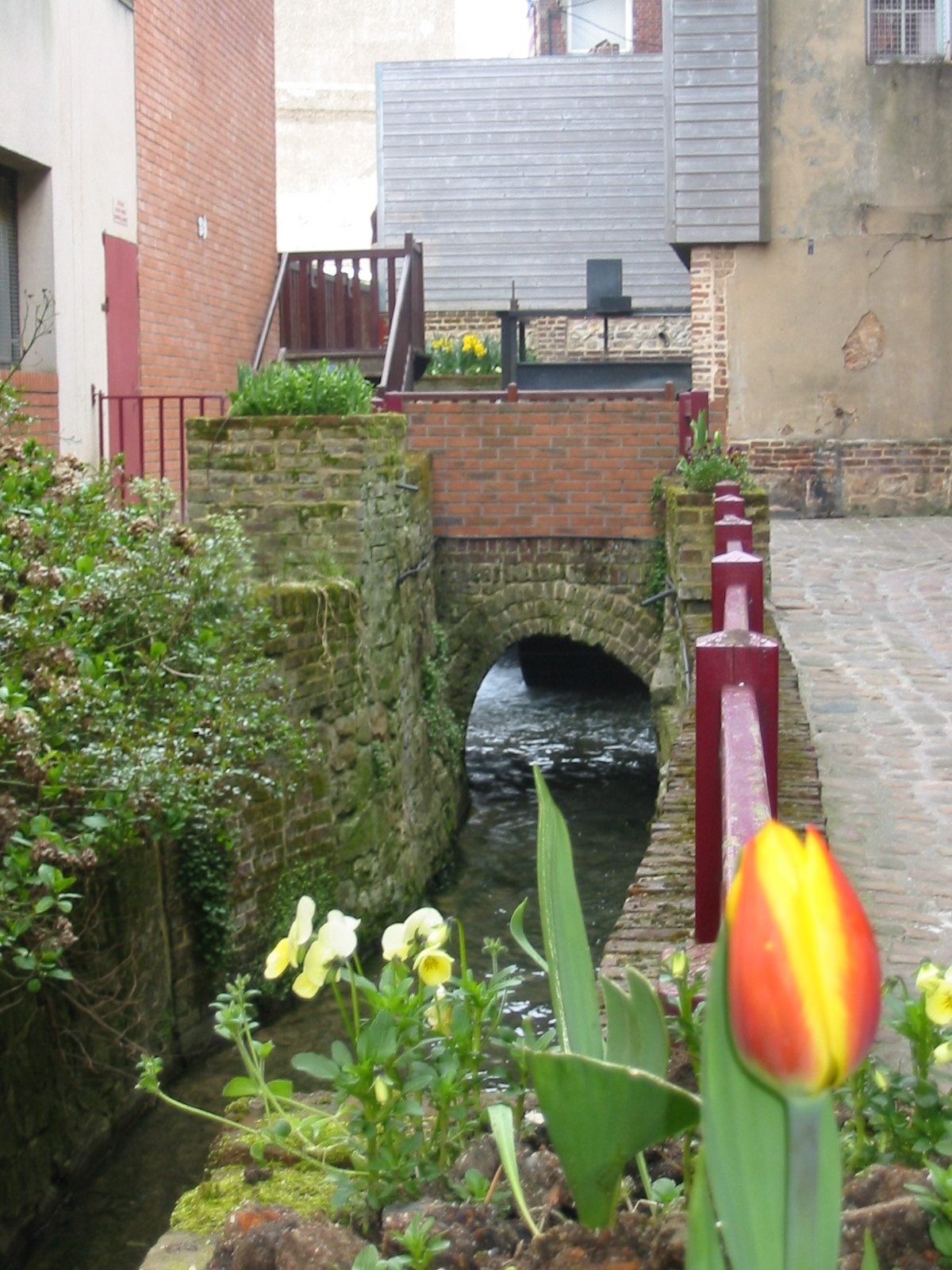
Ruelle Papavoine

Bolbec developed thanks to the numerous mills which lined the river banks through the town. These mills, numbering 14 in the middle of the 19th century, allowed the development of a textile industry based on water power, and later steam, to power the machinery.

Today, only three mills remain: one at the source of the river in the grounds of the Oril factory; one at Vallot; and one in the Ruelle Papavoine.

At the end of the 18th century, a number of manufacturers installed themselves in Bolbec to produce "Indiennes" (printed textiles). On the eve of the Revolution, Bolbec had 18 factories. In 1806, there were 27 producing Indiennes employing nearly 800 workers.

The importance of textiles in the Bolbec Valley was recognised by the state with the creation of the Chambre des Arts et Manufactures in 1806 (which became the Chamber of Commerce and Industry) and further, with the creation of a Conseil des Prud'hommes in 1813. However, over the years the textile industry suffered economic crises and by the end of the 19th century there was just one indiennerie remaining.

Bolbec is the last French town in which Thomas Jefferson, his family, and Sally and James Hemings stayed in 1789 prior to their arrival in Le Havre to return to America after their time in Paris.

=== Bolbec today ===
Little remains of the textile history of the town. A single former factory remains, that of the Desgenétais works, closed in 1986. In effect, this site is the last witness of the impact of the textile factories on Bolbec town planning: school, creche, chapel, workers' and foremen's houses… The site provides an exceptional insight into the epoch.

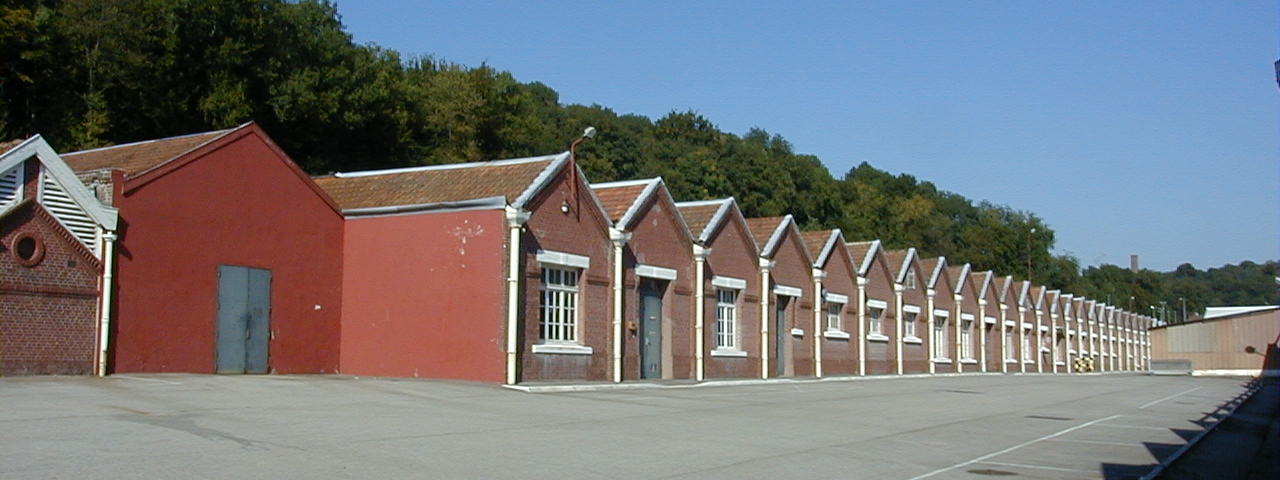
Desgenétais factory

=== Heraldry ===
Arms of Bolbec	The arms of Bolbec are blazoned : Gules, 3 shuttles argent, on a chief azure 3 fleurs de lys Or..

== Population ==
Historical population
Year	Pop.	±% p.a.
1968	12,716	—
1975	12,555	−0.18%
1982	12,461	−0.11%
1990	12,372	−0.09%
1999	12,588	+0.19%
2007	11,917	−0.68%
2012	11,753	−0.28%
2017	11,417	−0.58%
2023	11,590	+0.25%
Source: INSEE

== Economy ==
Bolbec is the seat of the Chamber of Commerce and Industry of Bolbec - Lillebonne.

=== Industry ===
The principal employers in Bolbec are Oril Industrie, part of the Servier Pharmaceutical group, and Cooper Standard Automotive, automobile equipment manufacturers specialising in waterproofing

== Sights ==
- Saint-Michel Church
- Manoir de Cailletot
- Mills: Moulins Seminel et du Vallot
- Château du Val au Grès

== Notable people ==
- François Amable Ruffin, (1771–1811), general
- Richard Charles Blondel, (born 1827), general
- Marion Gilbert, (1876–1951), writer
- Jacques Prevel, (1915–1951), poet
- Dominique Noguez, born 1942, writer
- Jacques Caudebec, (1664–1766), Huguenot Settler in America

== Twin towns ==
- Germany Ostercappeln
- Germany Bad Essen
- Germany Bohmte

== See also ==
- Communes of the Seine-Maritime department

== Bibliography ==
- Edouard-Ferdinand Collen-Castaigne, Essai historique et statistique sur la ville de Bolbec, Rouen, 1839
- Gustave F Mauconduit, Histoire des rues de Bolbec, Rouen, 1887
- Pierre Dardel, Les Manufactures de toiles peintes et de serges imprimées à Rouen et à Bolbec aux XVIIe et XVIIIe siècles, Rouen, 1940
- Jacques Vauquelin, La libération de Bolbec (Aout-Septembre 1954), Bolbec, 1969
- Jacques Vauquelin, Bolbec, ses rues… ses places…, Bolbec, 1970
- Jacques Vauquelin, Bolbec et son histoire…, Bolbec, 1974
- Jacques Vauquelin, Chateaux - Manoirs - Monuments et Sites de la région Bolbécaise, Bolbec, 1977
- Bolbec. Les hôtels de ville, les statues du jardin public, 1982
- Collège Roncherolles / L.E.P. Pierre de Coubertin, Bolbec et son canton <<Boulbai et son canton>>, Bolbec, 1982
- Alain Avenel et Raymond Bernard, Splendeur des indiennes bolbécaises, Bolbec, 1996
- Raymond Bernard, Bolbec. Ses rues d'hier à aujourd'hui, 2003
- Alain Gilles / Jean-Marc Derrien, Bolbec dans les années 1900 - 1 - Monuments, lieux publics, gare, rues..., 2004
- Alain Gilles / Jean-Marc Derrien, Bolbec de 1900 à 2000 - 3 - Travail et distractions des Bolbécais(es), biographie de Léon Desgenétais, sports, divers..., 2006
- Raymond Bernard, Bolbec. Ses écoles d'hier à aujourd'hui, 2006
- Philippe Delacroix, C.C.P.W.E n° 23. Le camp de prisonniers de guerre allemands de Bolbec (février 1945 - Août 1946)
