= Saint-Jean-de-la-Neuville =

- Commune
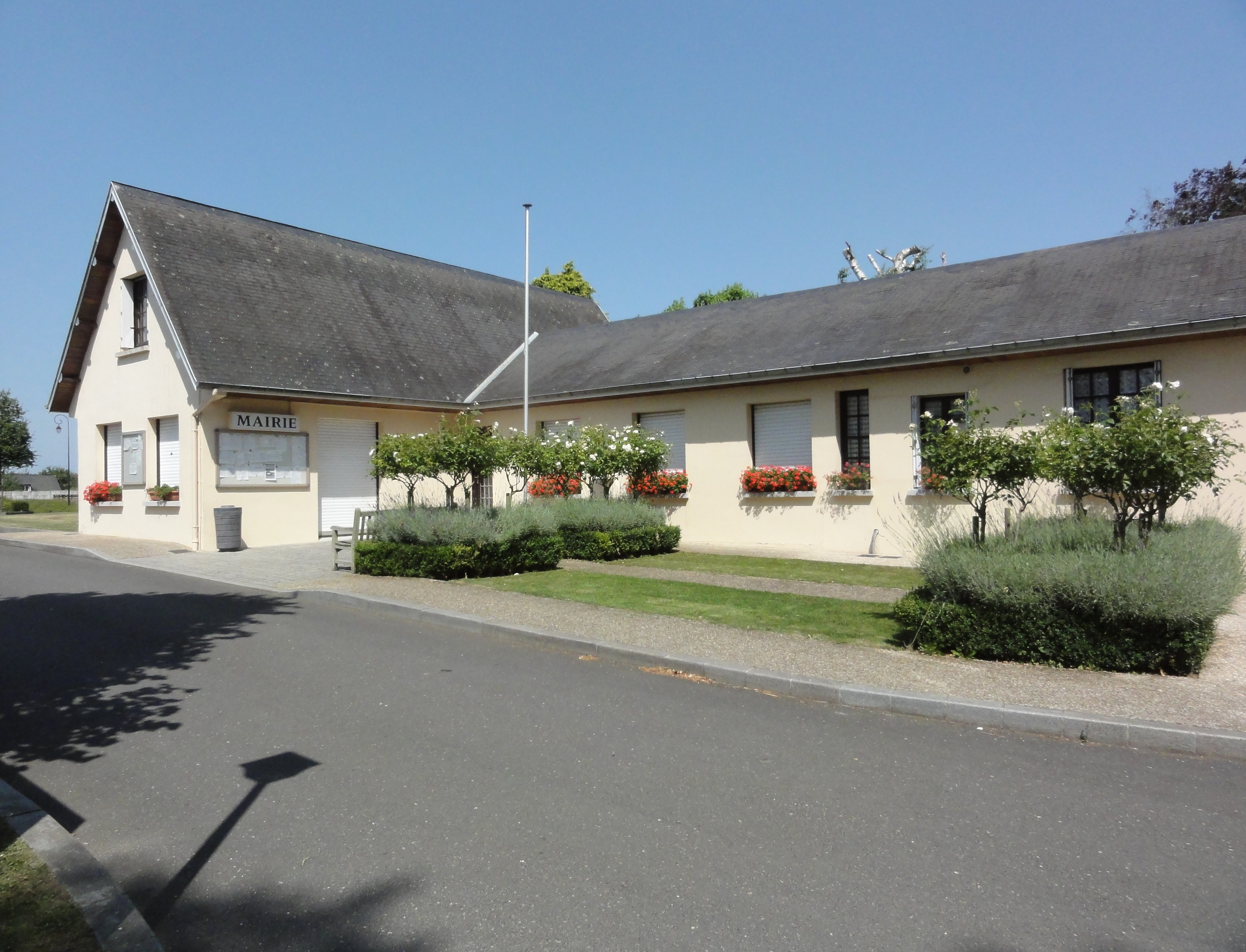
- Town hall
- Location of Saint-Jean-de-la-Neuville
- Location within France Location within Normandy
- Coordinates: 49°34′31″N 0°25′15″E
- Country: France
- Region: Normandy
- Department: Seine-Maritime
- Arrondissement: Le Havre
- Canton: Bolbec
- Intercommunality: Caux Seine Agglo

Government
  - Mayor (2026–32): Vincent Duhamel
- Area^{1}: 7.93 km^{2} (3.06 sq mi)
- Elevation: 132 m (433 ft)
- Highest elevation: 128 m (420 ft)
- Lowest elevation: 49 m (161 ft)
- Population (2023): 665
  - Density: 83.9/km^{2} (217/sq mi)
- Time zone: UTC+01:00 (CET)
  - Summer (DST): UTC+02:00 (CEST)
- INSEE/Postal code: 76593 /76210
- ^{1} French Land Register data, which excludes lakes, ponds, glaciers > 1 km^{2} (0.386 sq mi or 247 acres) and river estuaries.

Saint-Jean-de-la-Neuville (French pronunciation: [sɛ̃ ʒɑ̃ də la nøvil]) is a commune in the Seine-Maritime department in the Normandy region in northern France.

== Geography ==
A farming village in the Pays de Caux, situated some 15 miles (24 km) northeast of Le Havre, on the D112 road. Junction 7 of the A29 autoroute with the D910 road is entirely within the borders of the commune.

== Population ==
Historical population
Year	Pop.	±% p.a.
1968	276	—
1975	317	+2.00%
1982	404	+3.53%
1990	477	+2.10%
1999	471	−0.14%
2007	547	+1.89%
2012	555	+0.29%
2017	587	+1.13%
2023	665	+2.10%
Source: INSEE

== Places of interest ==
- The church of St.Jean, dating from the sixteenth century.
- The ruins of a sixteenth-century chateau.

== See also ==
- Communes of the Seine-Maritime department
