= Mirville =

- Commune
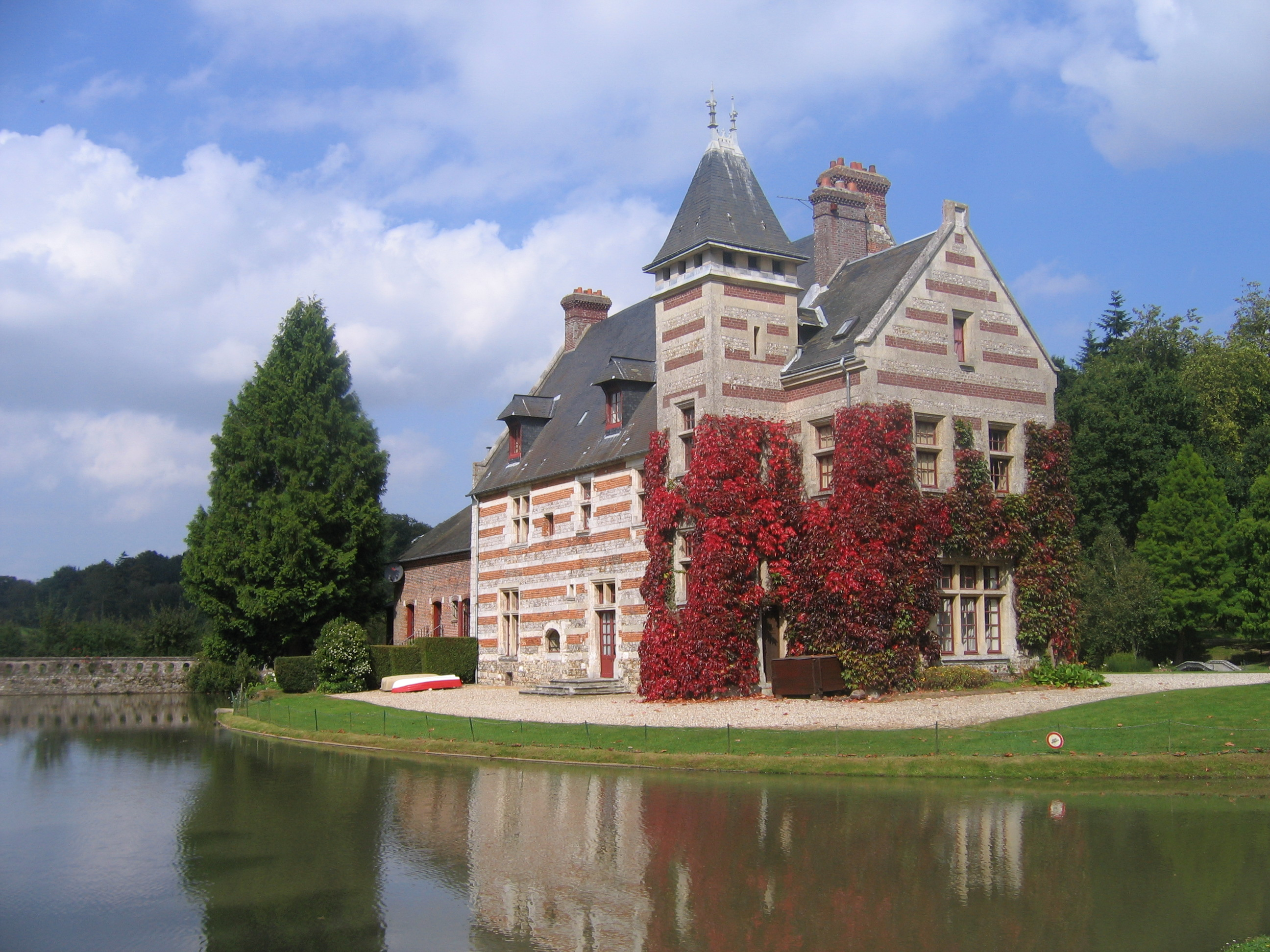
- Chateau of Mirville

- Coat of arms
- Location of Mirville
- Location within France Location within Normandy
- Coordinates: 49°36′38″N 0°26′35″E
- Country: France
- Region: Normandy
- Department: Seine-Maritime
- Arrondissement: Le Havre
- Canton: Bolbec
- Intercommunality: Caux Seine Agglo

Government
  - Mayor (2020–2026): Annick Sevestre
- Area^{1}: 5.42 km^{2} (2.09 sq mi)
- Elevation: 100 m (330 ft)
- Highest elevation: 147 m (482 ft)
- Lowest elevation: 74 m (243 ft)
- Population (2023): 346
  - Density: 63.8/km^{2} (165/sq mi)
- Time zone: UTC+01:00 (CET)
  - Summer (DST): UTC+02:00 (CEST)
- INSEE/Postal code: 76439 /76210
- ^{1} French Land Register data, which excludes lakes, ponds, glaciers > 1 km^{2} (0.386 sq mi or 247 acres) and river estuaries.

Mirville (French pronunciation: [miʁvil]) is a commune in the Seine-Maritime department in the Normandy region in northern France.

== Geography ==
A small farming village in the Pays de Caux situated some 19 miles (31 km) northeast of Le Havre, at the junction of the D252 and D72 roads.

== Population ==
Historical population
Year	Pop.	±% p.a.
1968	211	—
1975	203	−0.55%
1982	232	+1.93%
1990	287	+2.69%
1999	318	+1.15%
2007	306	−0.48%
2012	338	+2.01%
2017	335	−0.18%
2023	346	+0.54%
Source: INSEE

== Places of interest ==
- The sixteenth-century chateau de Mirville.
- The church of St.Quentin, dating from the thirteenth century.
- A feudal motte (eleventh century).
- The nineteenth century railway viaduct, built in 1844 : 524m in length with 49 arches, the highest of which is 35m.

== See also ==
- Communes of the Seine-Maritime department
