= Lanquetot =

- Commune
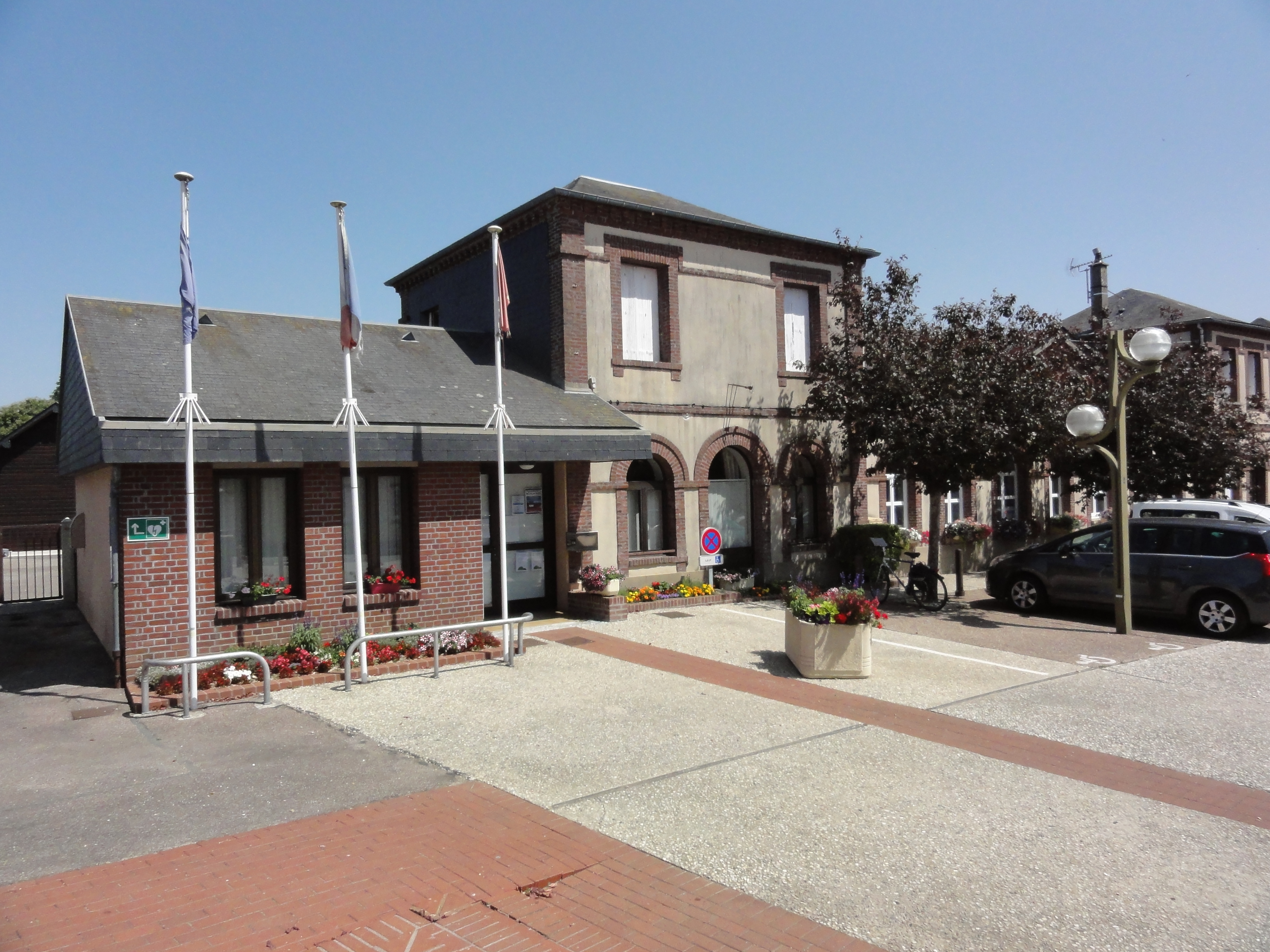
- Town hall

- Coat of arms
- Location of Lanquetot
- Location within France Location within Normandy
- Coordinates: 49°35′09″N 0°31′34″E
- Country: France
- Region: Normandy
- Department: Seine-Maritime
- Arrondissement: Le Havre
- Canton: Bolbec
- Intercommunality: Caux Seine Agglo

Government
  - Mayor (2026–32): Roger Bergougnoux
- Area^{1}: 5.09 km^{2} (1.97 sq mi)
- Elevation: 142 m (466 ft)
- Highest elevation: 149 m (489 ft)
- Lowest elevation: 73 m (240 ft)
- Population (2023): 1,151
  - Density: 226/km^{2} (586/sq mi)
- Time zone: UTC+01:00 (CET)
  - Summer (DST): UTC+02:00 (CEST)
- INSEE/Postal code: 76382 /76210
- ^{1} French Land Register data, which excludes lakes, ponds, glaciers > 1 km^{2} (0.386 sq mi or 247 acres) and river estuaries.

Lanquetot (French pronunciation: [lɑ̃kto]) is a commune in the Seine-Maritime department in the Normandy region in northern France.

== Geography ==
A farming village in the Pays de Caux, some 19 miles (31 km) northeast of Le Havre, at the junction of the D9015, D30 and D109 roads.

== Heraldry ==
| Arms of Lanquetot | The arms of Lanquetot are blazoned : Gules, in fess 2 garbs between 2 leopards respectant and 2 weaver's shuttles in saltire Or. |

== Population ==
Historical population
| Year | Pop. | ±% p.a. |
|---|---|---|
| 1968 | 824 | — |
| 1975 | 907 | +1.38% |
| 1982 | 1,063 | +2.29% |
| 1990 | 1,000 | −0.76% |
| 1999 | 1,004 | +0.04% |
| 2007 | 1,009 | +0.06% |
| 2012 | 1,059 | +0.97% |
| 2017 | 1,147 | +1.61% |
| 2023 | 1,151 | +0.06% |
Source: INSEE

== Places of interest ==
- The church of St. Aubin, dating from the eleventh century.

== See also ==
- Communes of the Seine-Maritime department
