= Lillebonne =

- Commune
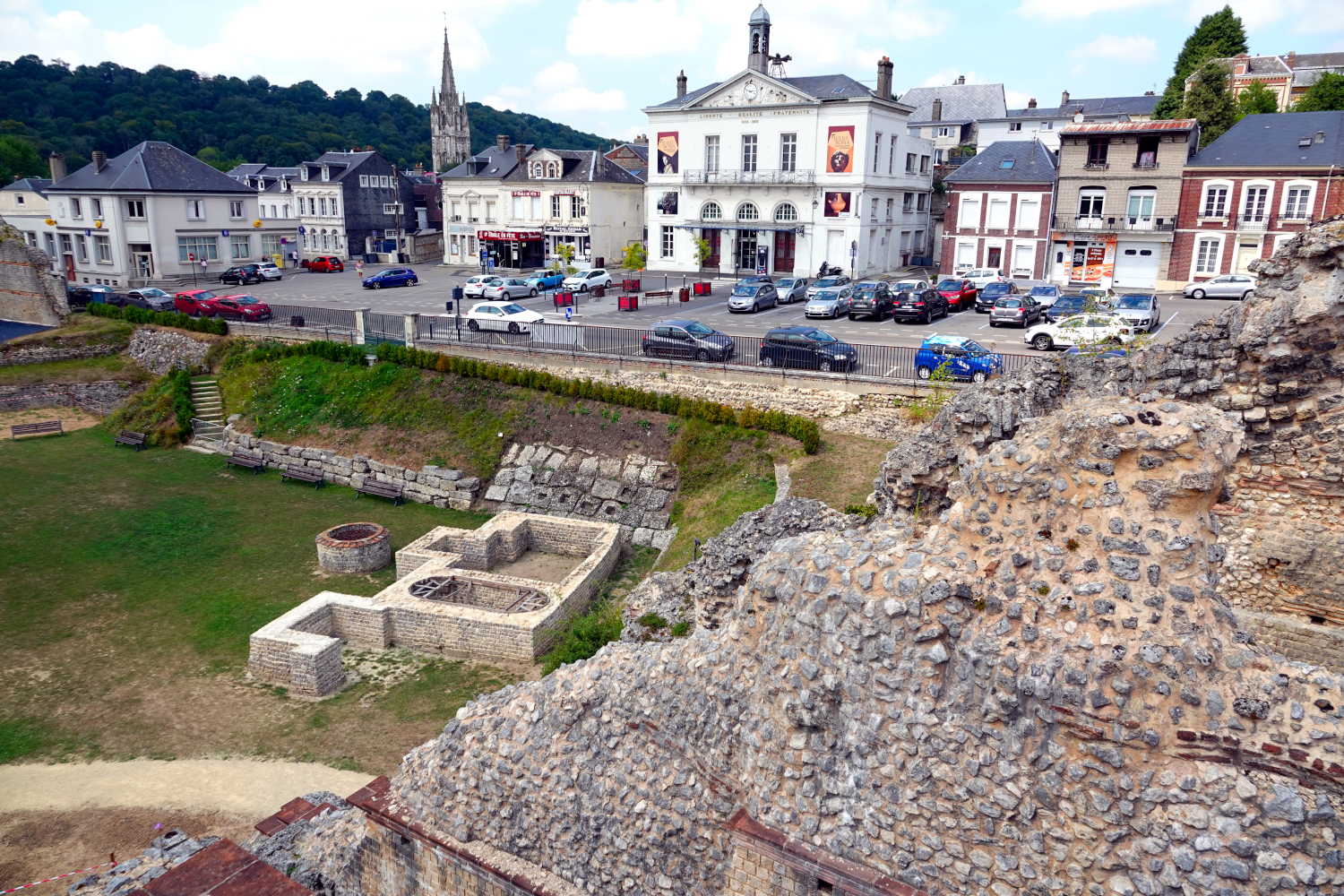
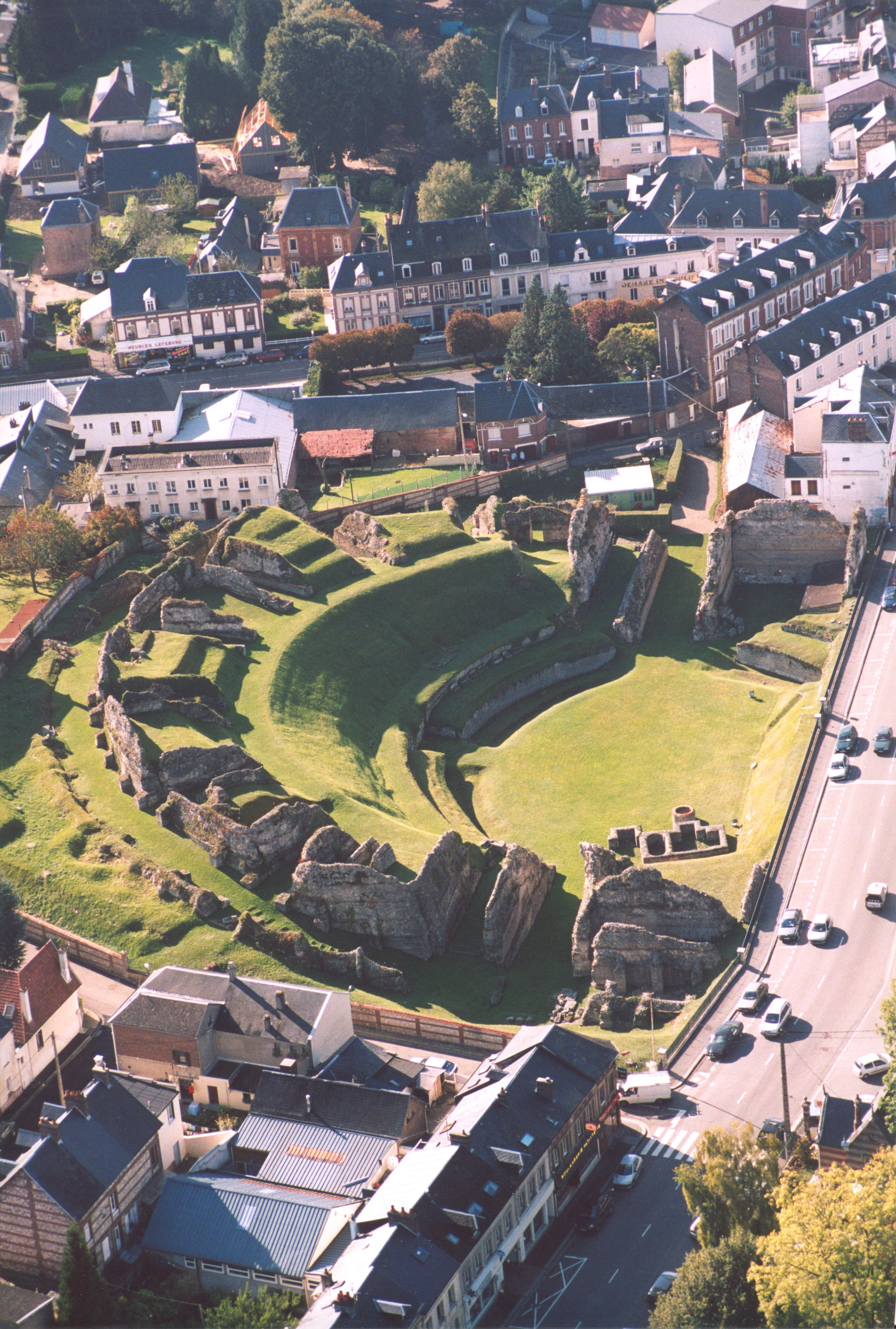
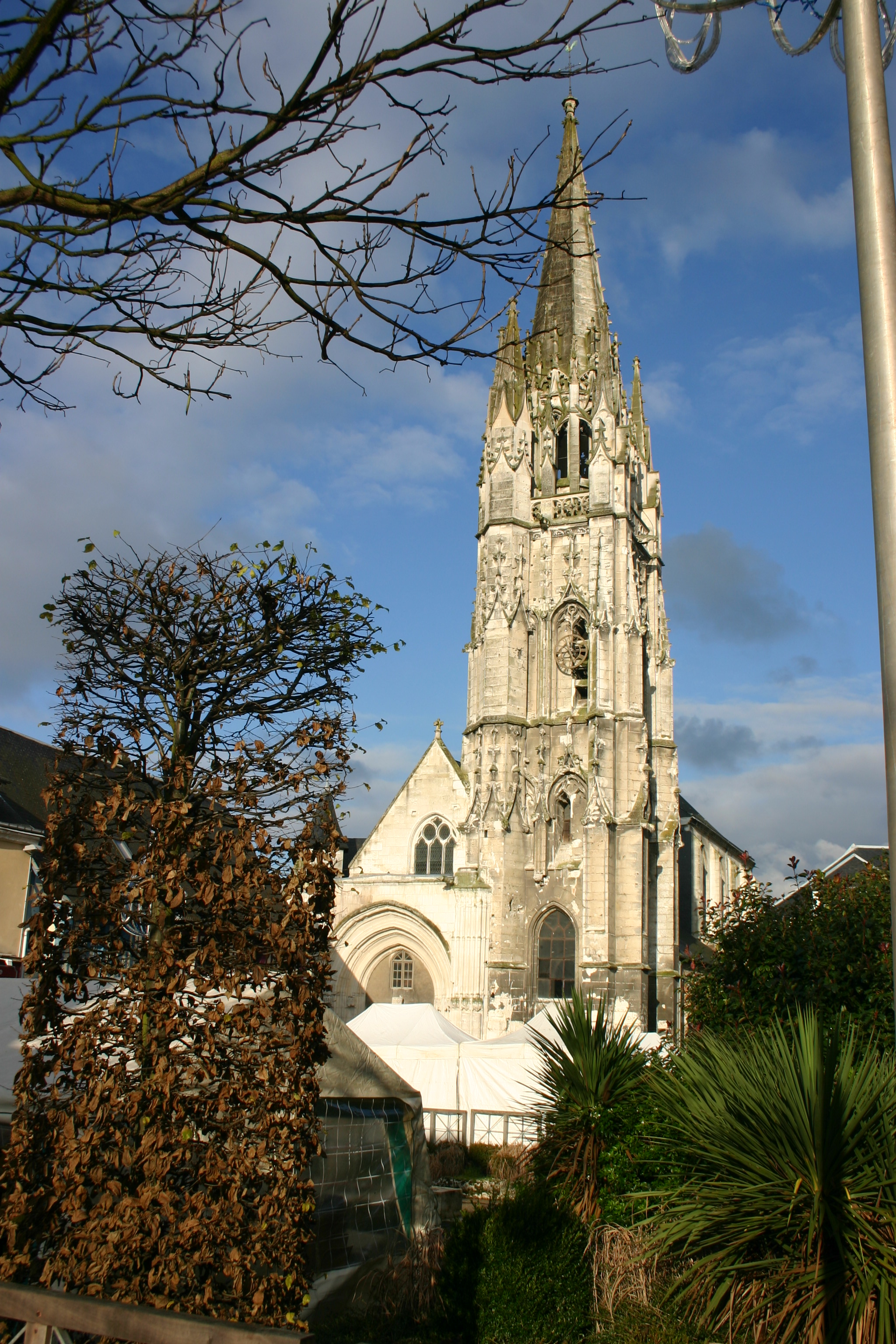
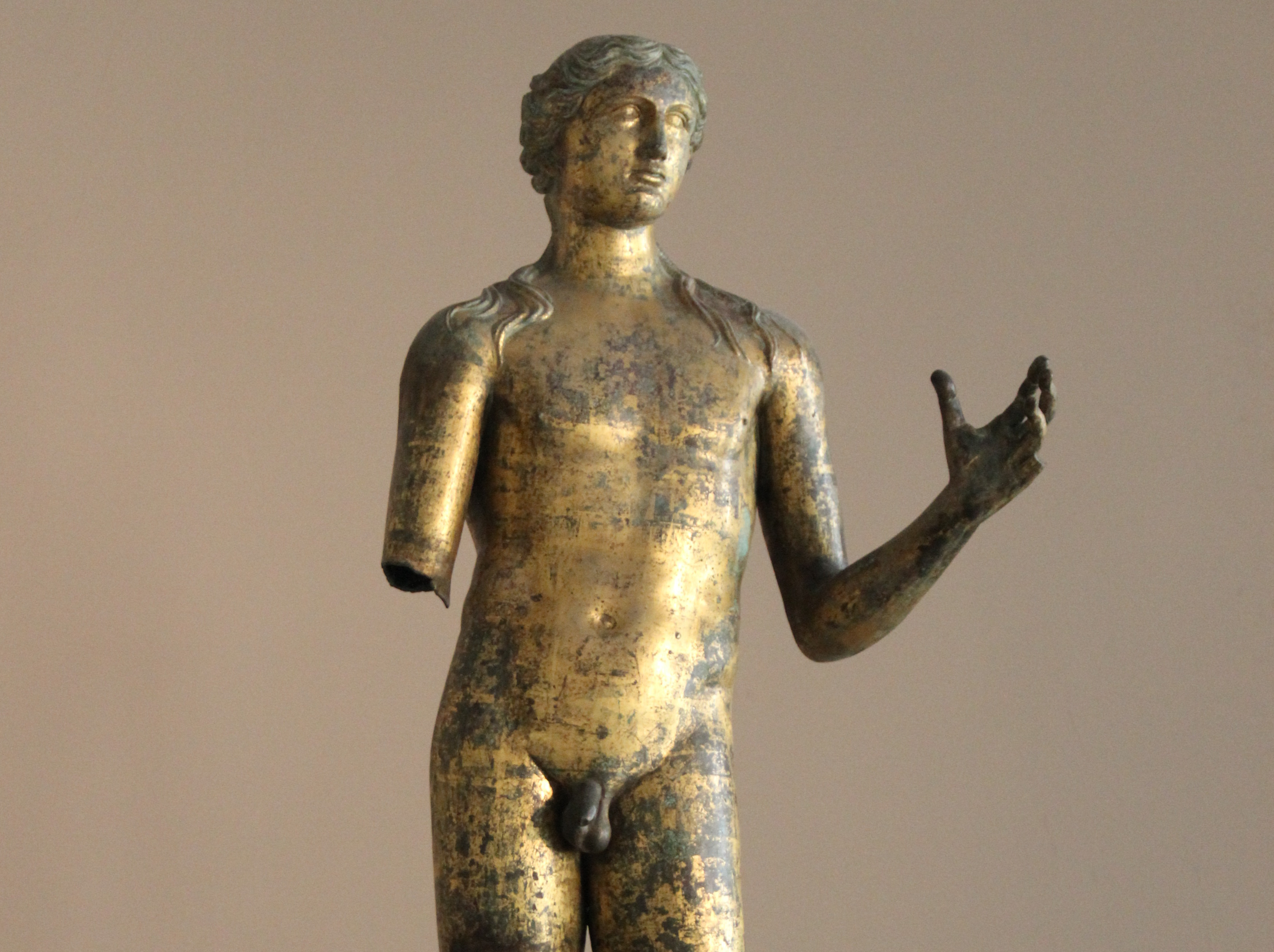
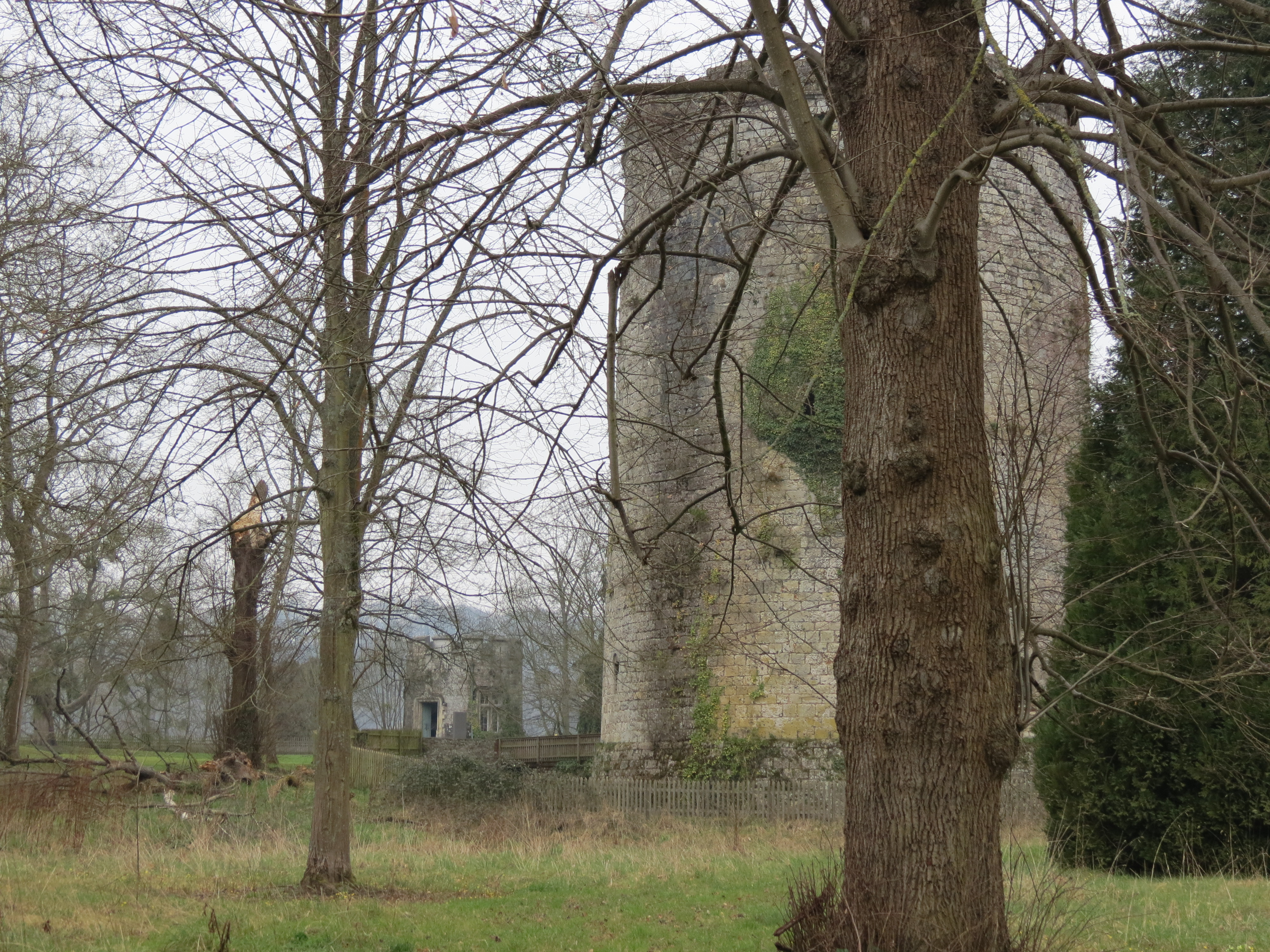
- From left to right, top to bottom: Juliobona museum as seen from the theatre with the city-centre in the background; Gallo-Roman theatre; the Notre-Dame church; a Gallo-Roman Apollo statue found at Lillebonne; the Medieval castle.

- Coat of arms
- Location of Lillebonne
- Location within France Location within Normandy
- Coordinates: 49°31′08″N 0°32′03″E
- Country: France
- Region: Normandy
- Department: Seine-Maritime
- Arrondissement: Le Havre
- Canton: Bolbec
- Intercommunality: Caux Seine Agglo

Government
  - Mayor (2020–2026): Christine Déchamps
- Area^{1}: 14.66 km^{2} (5.66 sq mi)
- Elevation: 6 m (20 ft)
- Highest elevation: 1,338 m (4,390 ft)
- Lowest elevation: 0 m (0 ft)
- Population (2023): 8,541
  - Density: 582.6/km^{2} (1,509/sq mi)
- Time zone: UTC+01:00 (CET)
  - Summer (DST): UTC+02:00 (CEST)
- INSEE/Postal code: 76384 /76170
- ^{1} French Land Register data, which excludes lakes, ponds, glaciers > 1 km^{2} (0.386 sq mi or 247 acres) and river estuaries.

Lillebonne (French pronunciation: [lilbɔn]) is a commune in the Seine-Maritime department in the Normandy region in Northern France. It lies 3.5 miles (5.6 km) north of the Seine and 24 miles (39 km) east of Le Havre.

== History ==
Before the Roman conquest of Gaul, the site was the capital of the Caletes tribe who gave their name to the Pays de Caux. It was destroyed by Julius Caesar in his Gallic Wars and the city of Juliobona built there by Augustus in the 1st c. AD.

It become an important centre whence Roman roads branched out in all directions. It was an administrative, military and commercial city located close to the Seine. This made it a great transportation route between Britannia (modern-day Britain) and the remainder of the Roman Empire. It was also a crossroads of communication for Roman roads to Harfleur, Étretat, Dieppe, Évreux and Rouen. The city was completely destroyed in the middle of the 2nd century.

The remains of Roman baths and of a theatre capable of holding 3,000 persons have been brought to light. Many Roman relics, notably a bronze statue of Apollo (displayed in the Louvre) have been found. The important Lillebonne mosaic, well preserved and depicting a deer hunt, comes from a suburban villa and is on display at the Rouen Museum. It was made by T. SEN FILIX from Pozzuoli, Italy and AMOR, his local apprentice.

It was again ruined in the barbarian invasions of 273 after which the theatre was made into a fortress: the exits were blocked, wells were dug, and baths put up in the arena.

In the Middle Ages the town walls were constructed out of materials from the Roman theatre. The town recovered some of its importance under William the Conqueror who built a castle here who held the Council of Lillebonne here which decided on the conquest of England. At an ecclesiastical council held in Lillebonne in 1080, William was confirmed in his ultimate authority over the Norman church.

Lillebonne is the birthplace of the writer Annie Ernaux.

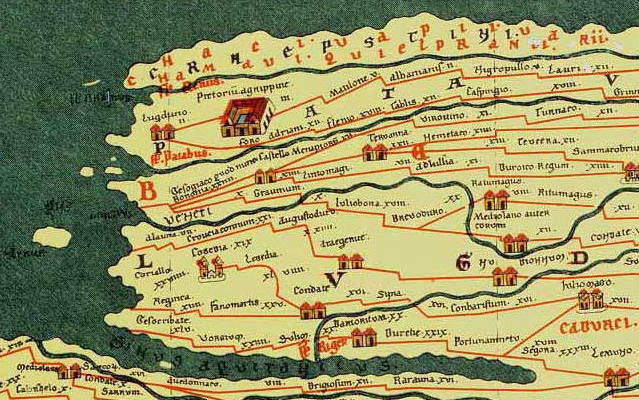
Detail of the Tabula Peutingeriana from 1st-4th century, (Juliobona is at the center)

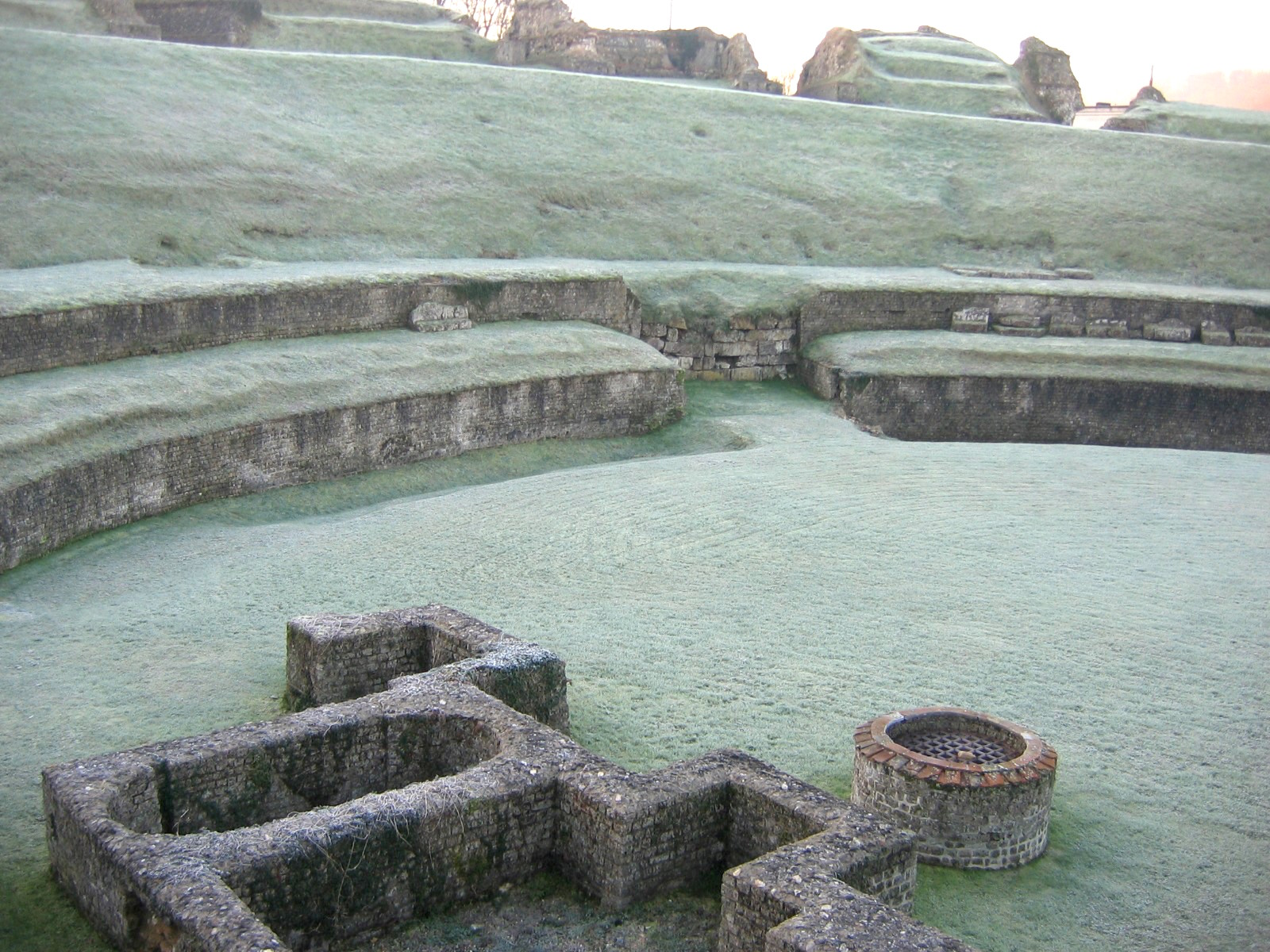
Roman theatre of Lillebonne

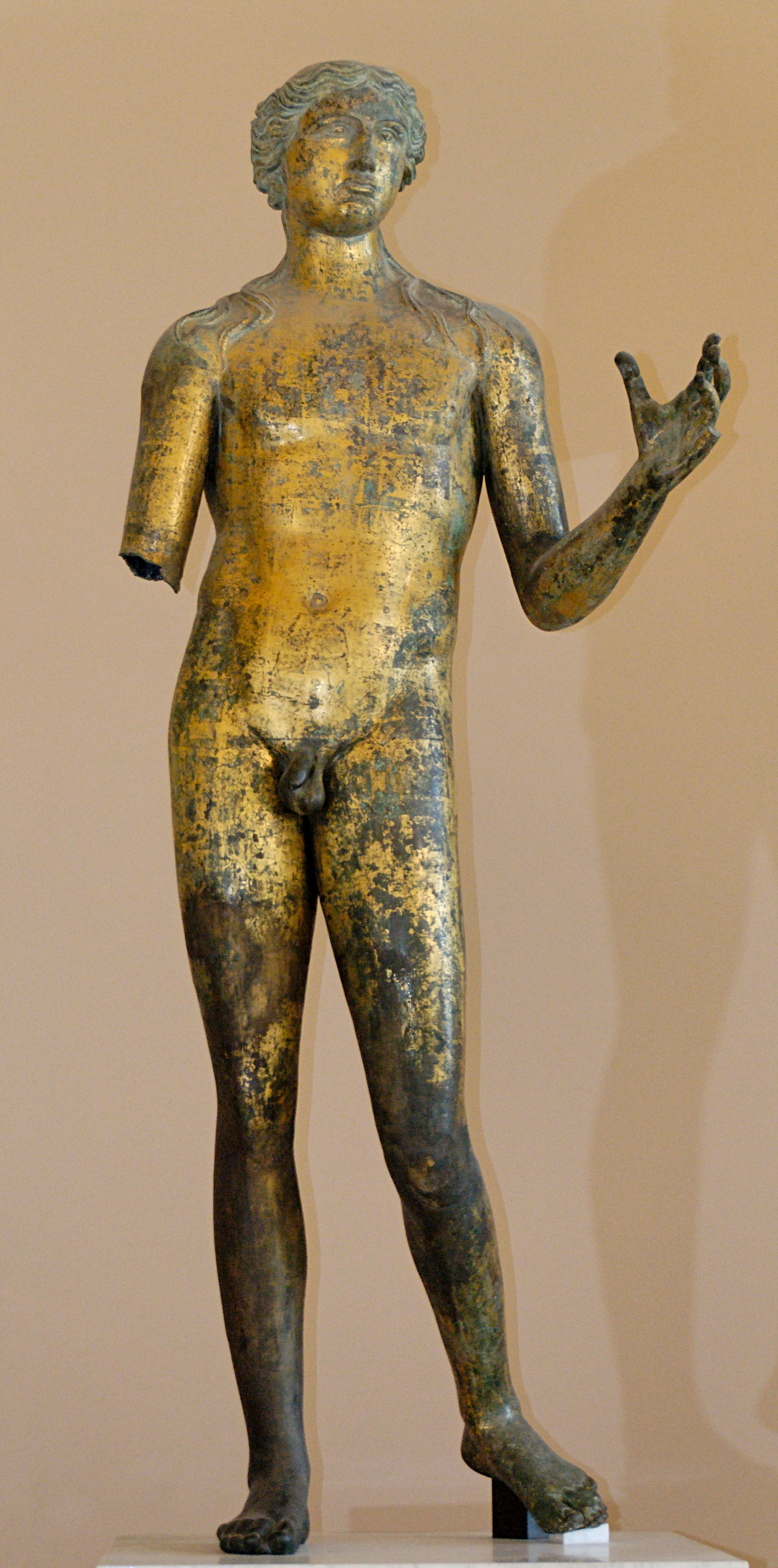
Apollo found at Lillebonne, bronze statue from 2nd century, museum of the Louvre (Paris)

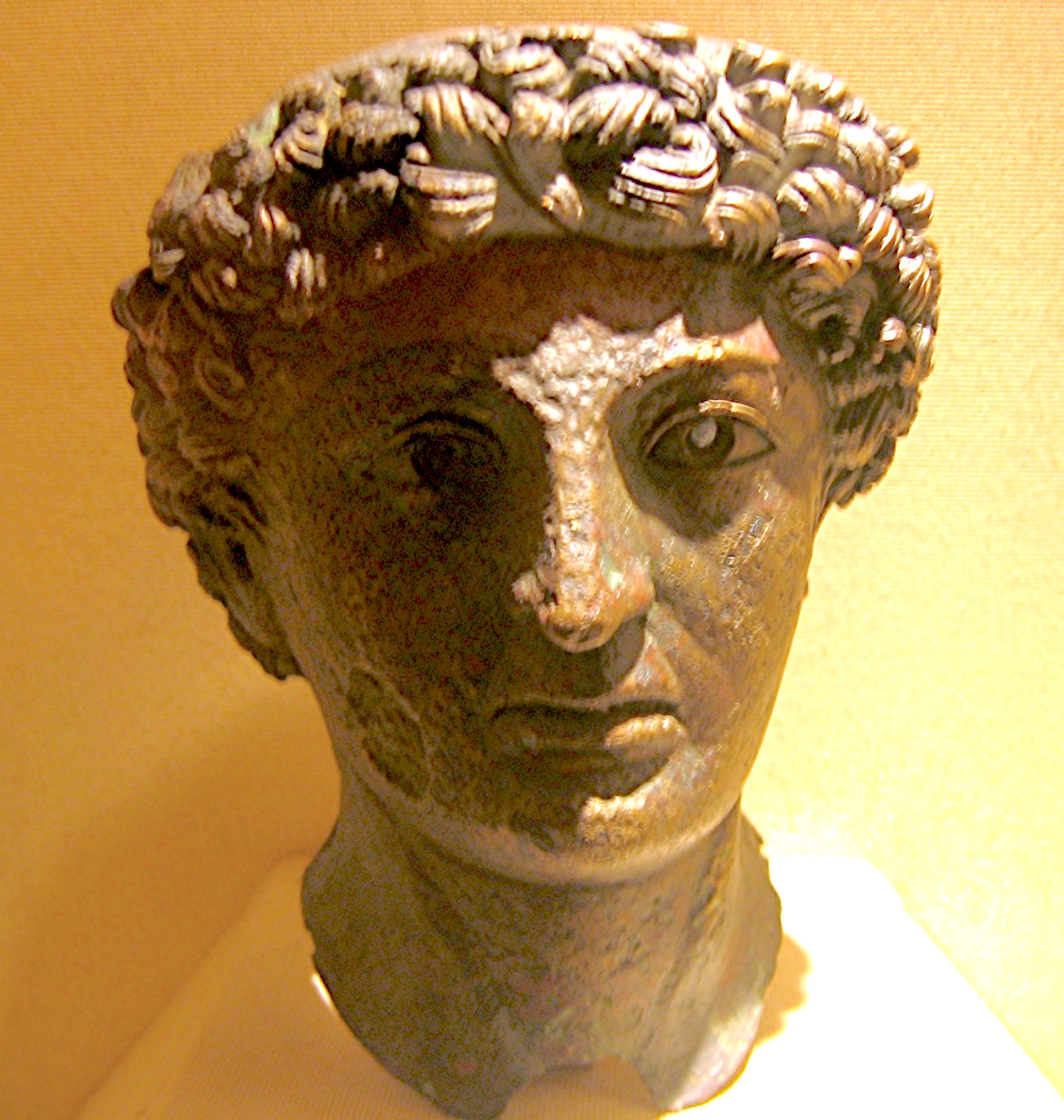
Bronze head of a Roman god, found at Lillebonne, Musée des antiquités of the Seine-Maritime (Rouen)

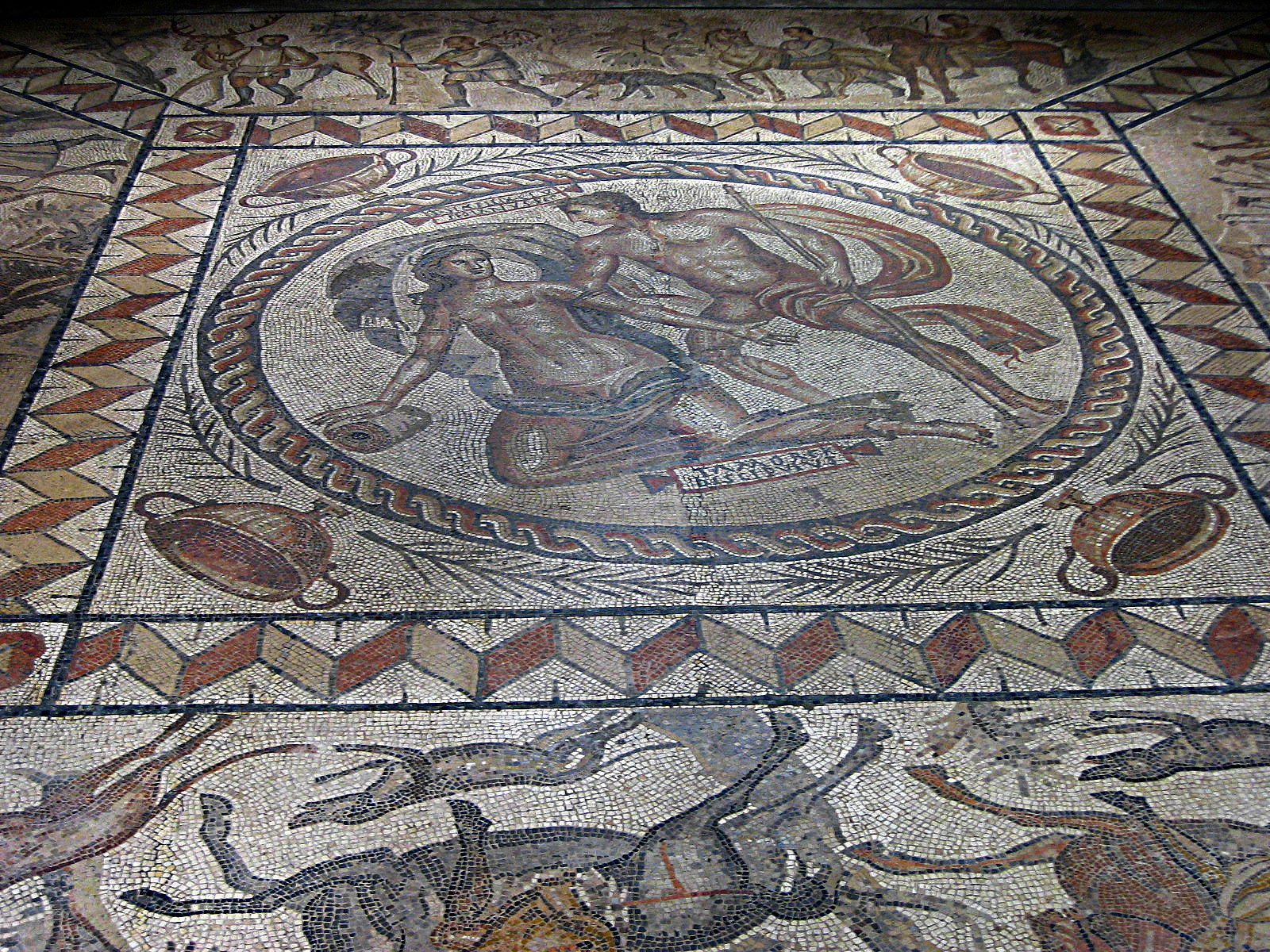
Orpheus mosaic found at Lillebonne, Musée des antiquités of the Seine-Maritime (Rouen)

== Geography ==
Lillebonne lies in the valley of the river Bolbec at the foot of wooded hills at the junction of the D982, D29 and the D81 roads.

== Demographics ==
Historical population
Year	Pop.	±% p.a.
1968	9,615	—
1975	10,241	+0.91%
1982	9,622	−0.89%
1990	9,310	−0.41%
1999	9,738	+0.50%
2007	9,495	−0.32%
2012	8,926	−1.23%
2017	8,894	−0.07%
2023	8,541	−0.67%
Source: INSEE

== Sights ==
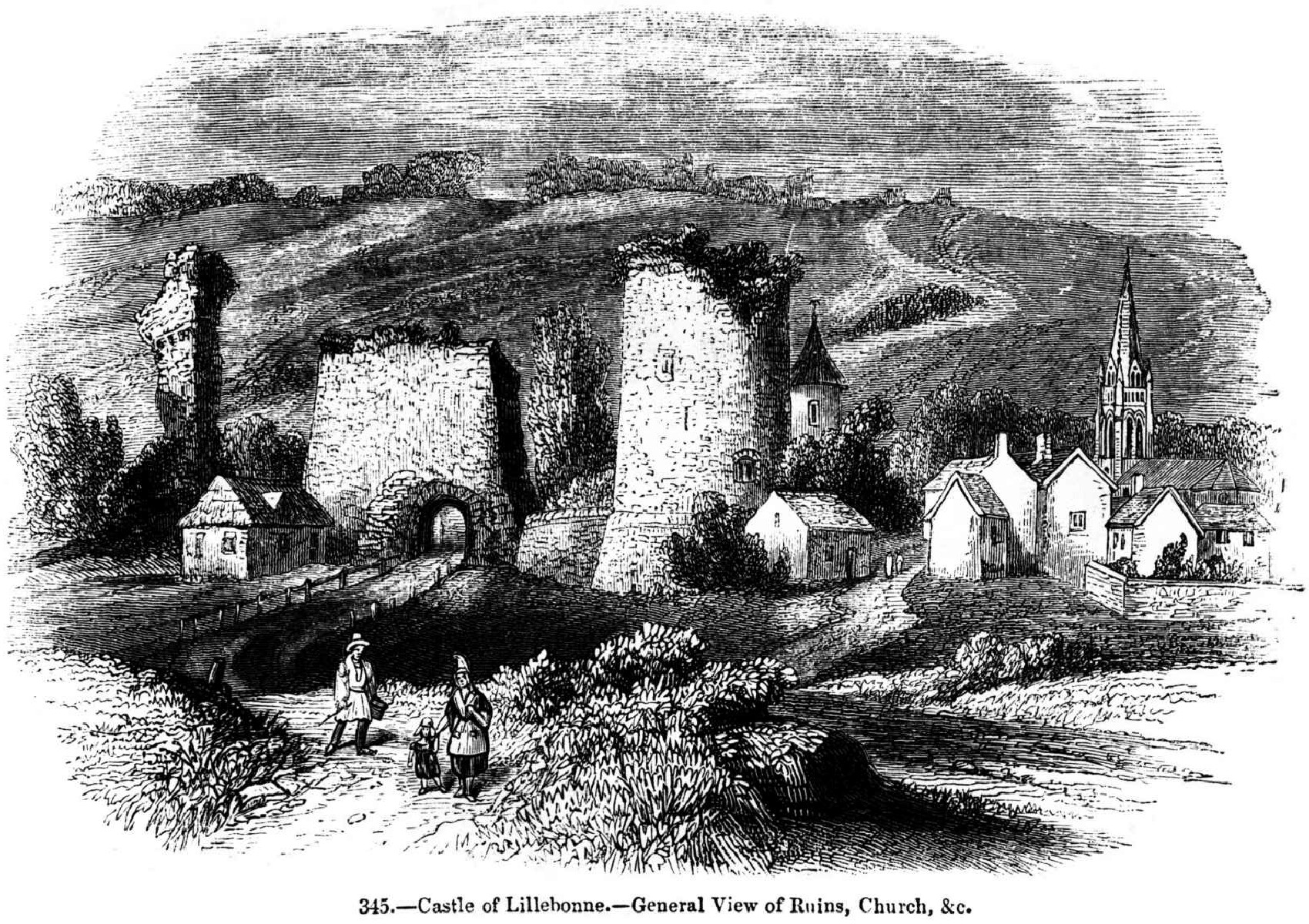
Engraving of the castle of William I of England in Lillebonne

The church of Notre Dame, partly modern, preserves a Gothic portal of the 16th century, and a graceful tower of the same period. The park contains a fine cylindrical keep and other remains of a castle founded by William the Conqueror and rebuilt in the 13th century.

The Gallo-Roman amphitheatre of Lillebonne was built in the first century, and was altered in the second century so that it could be used as both an amphitheatre and a theatre. Part of its remains are still visible today from Félix Faur Square, and the foundations of some of its remnants (the wings and backdrop) remain under the square.

== Economy ==
The principal industries in the past were cotton-spinning and the manufacture of calico and candles. There was also a prosperous manufacture of starch belonging to the Legrain family. Petrochemistry is now the main industry in the area, with a part of the nearby Notre-Dame-de-Gravenchon refining and petrochemical complex extending over the Lillebonne commune.

== Twin towns ==
- Wellington, United Kingdom
- Immenstadt, Germany.

== See also ==
- Communes of the Seine-Maritime department
