= Commerce (river) =

River in France

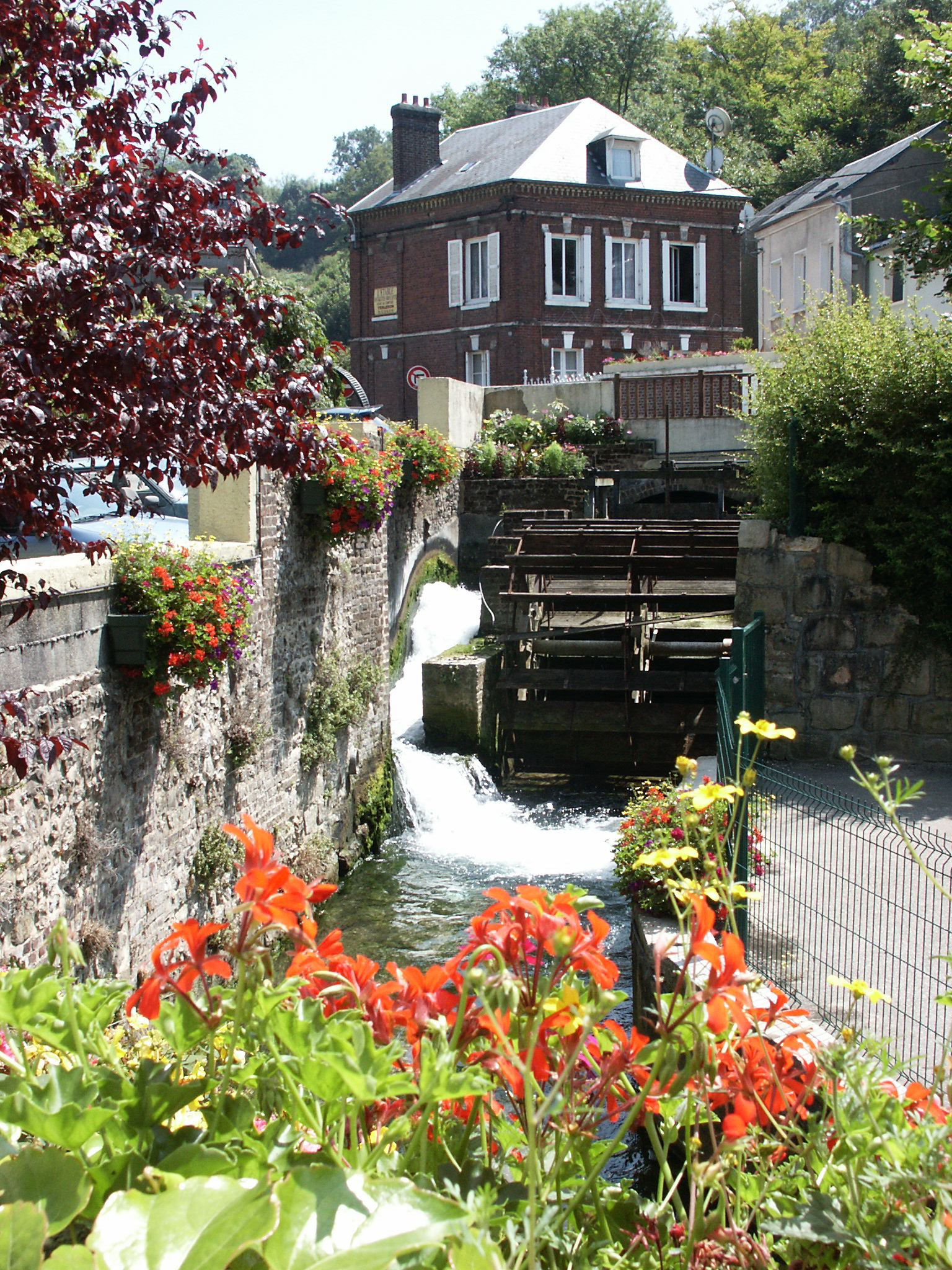
- The Bolbec at Vallot mill

- Location within France Location within Normandy

Location
- Country: France
- Region: Normandy

Physical characteristics
- Source
  - location: Pays de Caux
  - elevation: 140 m (460 ft)
- Mouth
  - location: Seine
  - coordinates: 49°28′52″N 0°31′30″E
- Length: 15.5 km (9.6 mi)
- Basin size: 160 km^{2} (62 sq mi)
- Discharge
  - average: 0.240 m^{3}/s (8.5 cu ft/s)

Basin features
- Progression: Seine→ English Channel

The river Bolbec (French pronunciation: [bɔlbɛk]) or Commerce (French pronunciation: [kɔmɛʁs]) is one of the rivers that flow from the plateau of the southern Pays de Caux in the Seine-Maritime département of Normandy into the Seine. It is 15.5 km (9.6 mi) long.

The river rises at Bolbec and passes Gruchet-le-Valasse, where its name changes to the Commerce. It then passes through Lillebonne and joins the Seine at Notre-Dame-de-Gravenchon.

== Economy ==
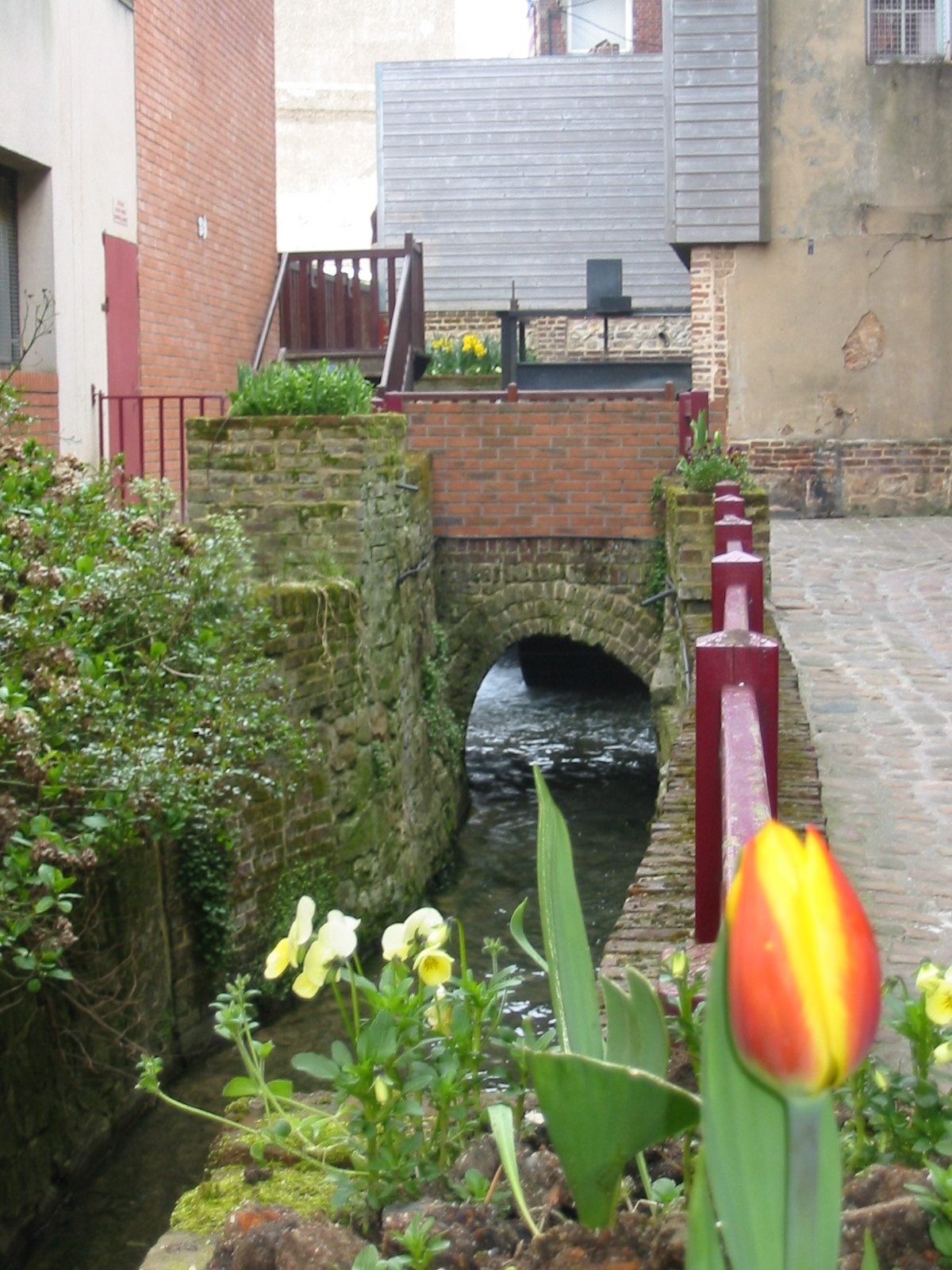
The Bolbec river at Bolbec

The river hosted many watermills that powered machinery to process both cotton and flax. The area became so prosperous it was named the Golden Valley.

== See also ==
- French water management scheme
