= Priory =

Religious houses that are presided over by a prior or prioress

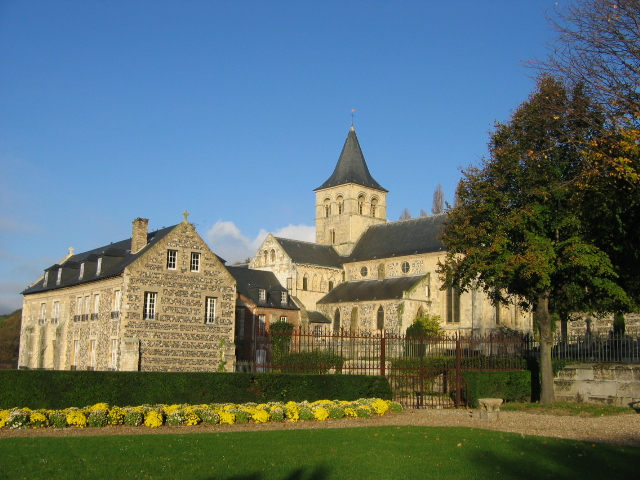
The Priory de Graville, France

A priory is a monastery of men or women under religious vows that is headed by a prior or prioress. They are found in the Catholic Church, Lutheran Churches, and Anglican Communion. Priories may be monastic houses of monks or nuns (such as the Benedictines, the Cistercians, or the Charterhouses). Houses of canons & canonesses regular also use this term, the alternative being canonry. Mendicant houses, of friars, nuns, or tertiary sisters (such as the Friars Preachers, Augustinian Hermits, and Carmelites) also exclusively use this term.

In pre-Reformation England, if an abbey church was raised to cathedral status, the abbey became a cathedral priory. The bishop, in effect, took the place of the abbot, and the monastery itself was headed by a prior.

== History ==
The cloister, chapter house and church of Canterbury Cathedral, an English Benedictine cathedral-priory.

Priories first came to existence as subsidiaries to Cluny Abbey. Many new houses were formed that were all subservient to Cluny and called Priories. As such, the priory came to represent the Benedictine ideals espoused by the Cluniac reforms as smaller, lesser houses of Benedictines of Cluny. There were likewise many conventual priories in Germany and Italy during the Middle Ages, and in England all monasteries attached to cathedral churches were known as cathedral priories.

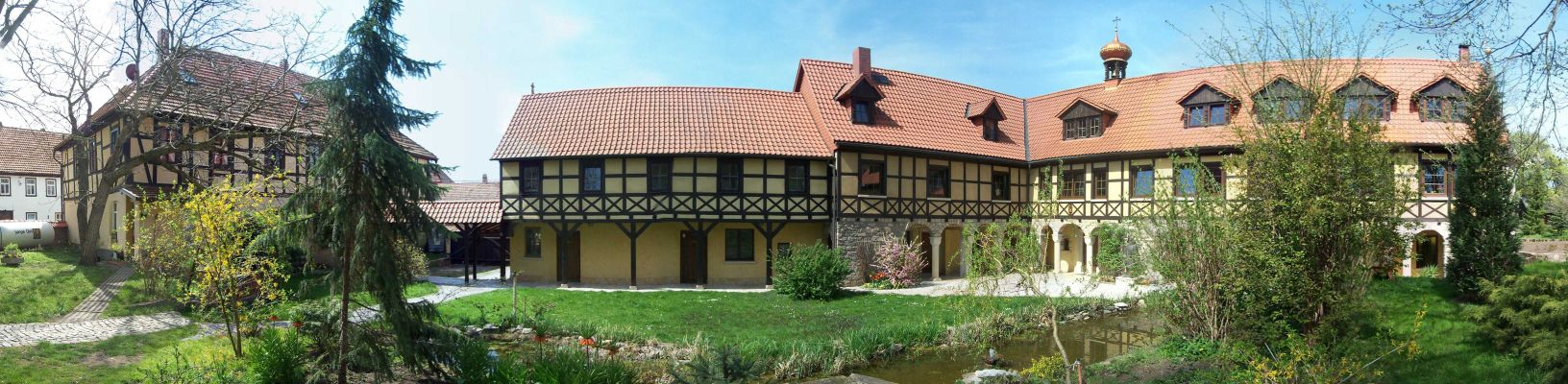
Priory of St. Wigbert, an Evangelical-Lutheran monastery in the Benedictine tradition (Germany)

The ruins of Finchale Priory, a dependent cell of Durham Cathedral-Priory.

The Benedictines and their offshoots, the Premonstratensians, and the military orders distinguished between conventual and simple or obedientiary priories.

- Conventual priories are those autonomous houses that have no abbots, either because the canonically required number of twelve monks has not yet been reached, or for some other reason.
- Simple or obedientiary priories are dependencies of abbeys. Their superior, who is subject to the abbot in everything, is called a simple or obedientiary prior. These monasteries are satellites of the mother abbey. The Cluniac order was organised entirely on this obedientiary principle, with a single abbot at Cluny, and all other houses being dependent priories.
