= Abbaye de Graville =

Museum in Le Havre, France

Coordinates: 49.50333°N 0.16561031°E

Abbey of Graville
- Abbaye de Graville
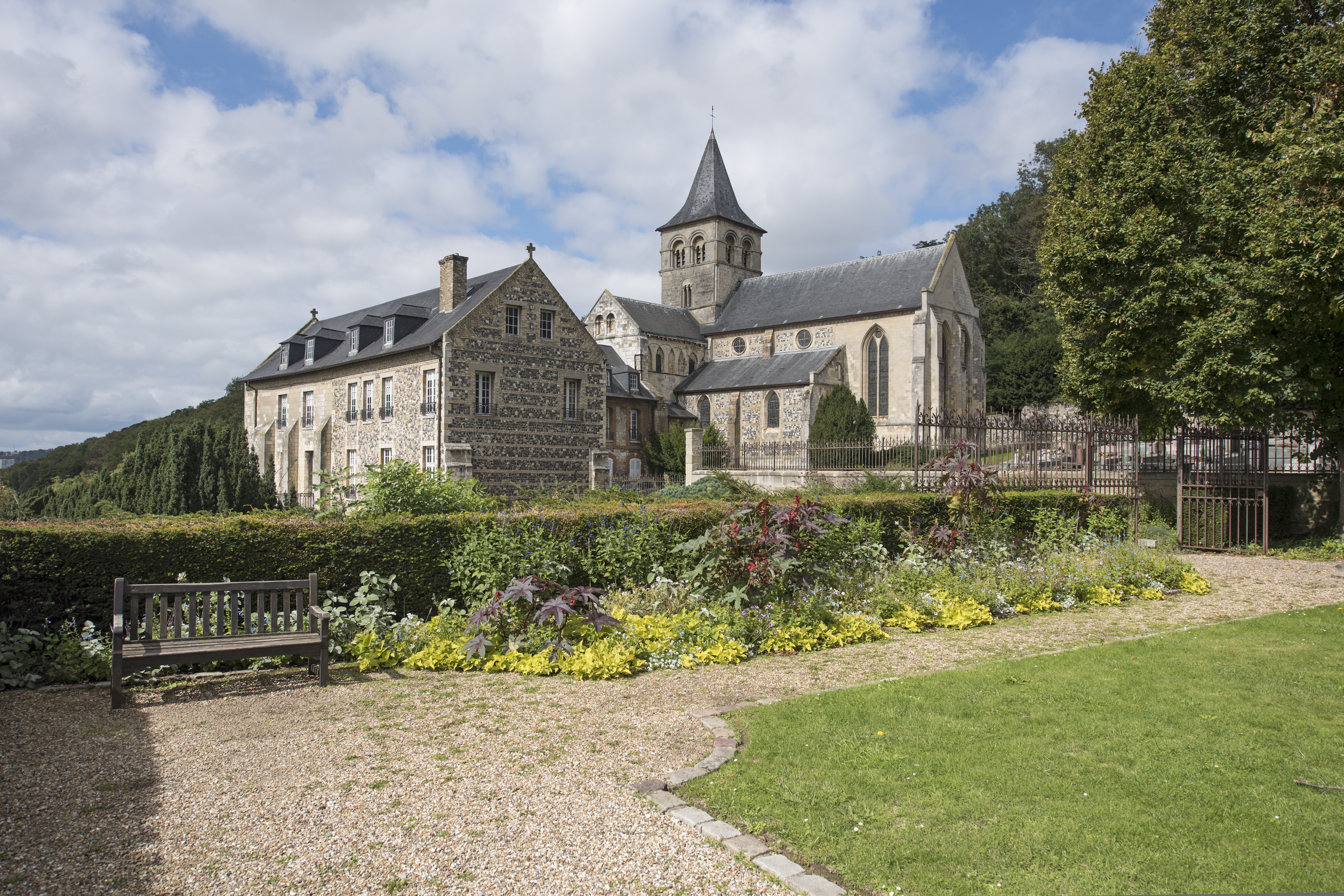
- View of the Abbey of Graville from the garden

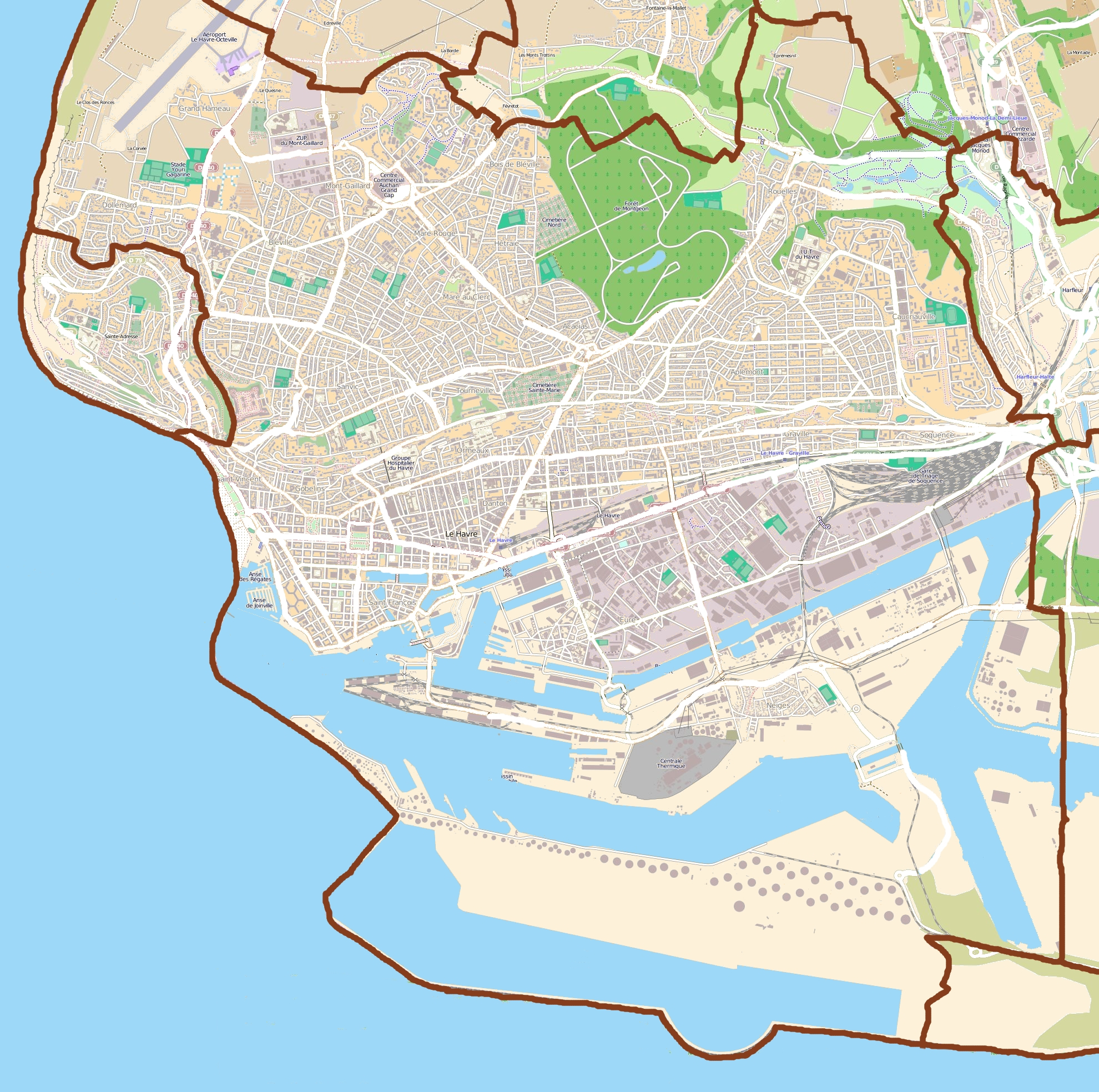
- Location in Le Havre
- Established: 11th century
- Location: Le Havre, France
- Type: Abbey
- Website: www.musees-mah-lehavre.fr

Abbaye de Graville (Abbey of Graville) is an abbey located in the city of Le Havre, in the Normandy region of France. The architectural complex was founded in the 11th century and consists of a church, conventual buildings, a refectory, a cloister, a garden, and a cemetery. Nowadays, one of the departments of the Museum of Art and History of Le Havre (Musée d'Art et d'Histoire du Havre) is located in the Abbey.

== History ==
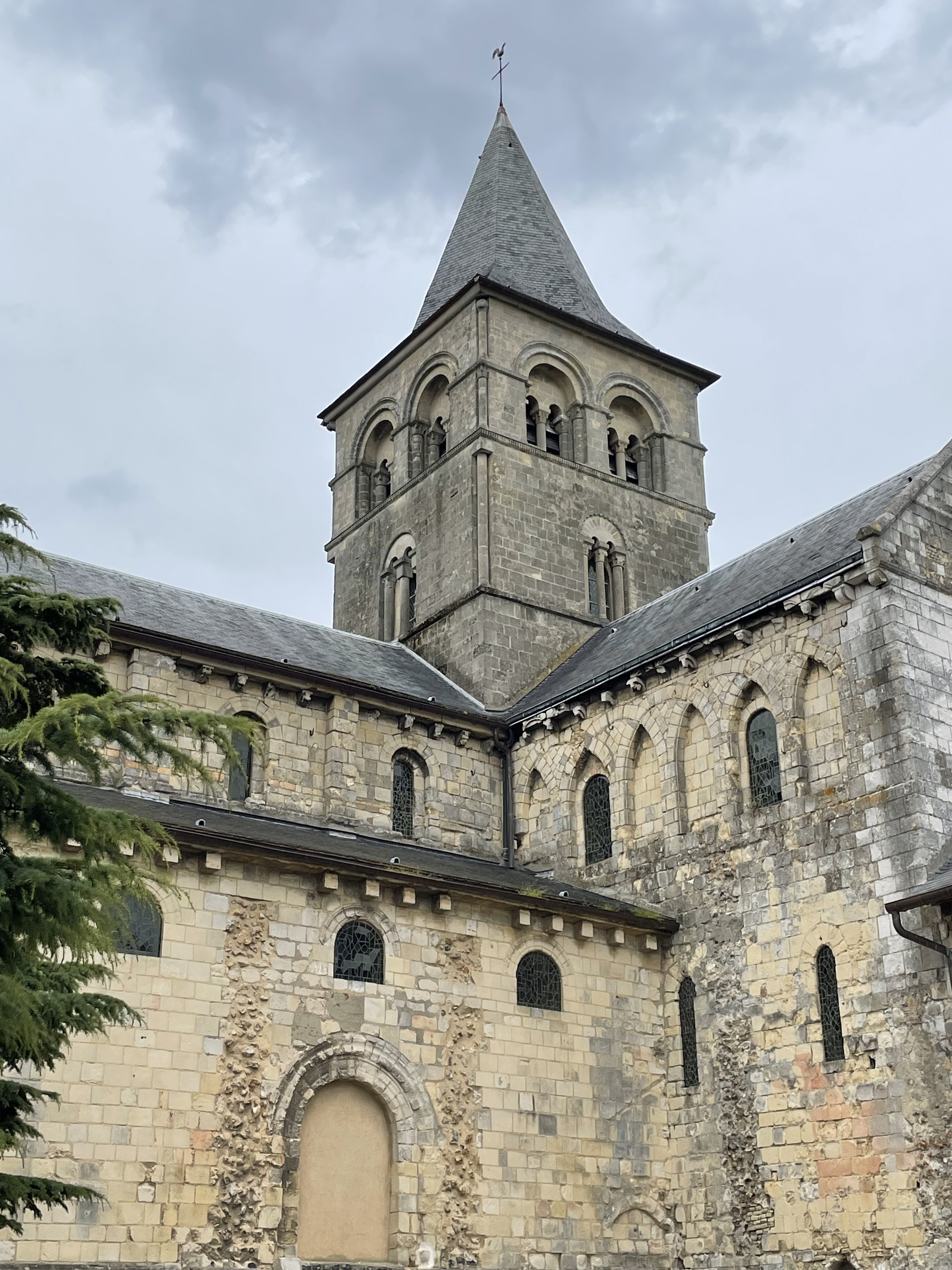
View of the southern side of the church at the Abbey of Graville

The Abbey is situated in the estuary of the River Seine between the historical center of Le Havre and the town of Harfleur. Its history goes back to the end of the Merovingian epoch in the middle of the 6th century, when hermits were living in the cliffs. Their mission was to promote Christianity in remote areas of Normandy on behalf of the clergy of the Cathedral of Notre-Dame in Bayeux, which was one of the religious centers (together with Rouen) in Normandy. Around that time, the hermits were also joined by the Augustines from the monastery of Sainte Barbe, thus contributing to the establishment of a christian community in Graville.

Viking raids in the ninth century meant the relics of Sainte Honorine were transported from Graville Abbey to Conflans, which became Conflans-Sainte-Honorine in the Paris region, safer by virtue of its southeasterly location. The monks also attempted to move their archives and monastic libraries to the south, but several were burned by the Vikings.

Between the 10th and 11th centuries, the reconstruction of the building of the Abbey was completed on the hill where the hermits used to live. Finally, the Abbey was founded in the 11th century, supposedly in 1203, by Guillaume Mallet, a companion of William the Conqueror, right after his return from the battle of Hastings. The construction of the Romanesque Abbey was funded on the basis of the tribute that he received both in Normandy and England. Since then, the Abbey had been under the auspices of the noble family of Malet de Graville. Later, the heart of one of the descendants of the family, Louis Malet de Graville (1440–1516), an Admiral of France, was placed in the Abbey as a symbol of connection between the family and the Abbey.

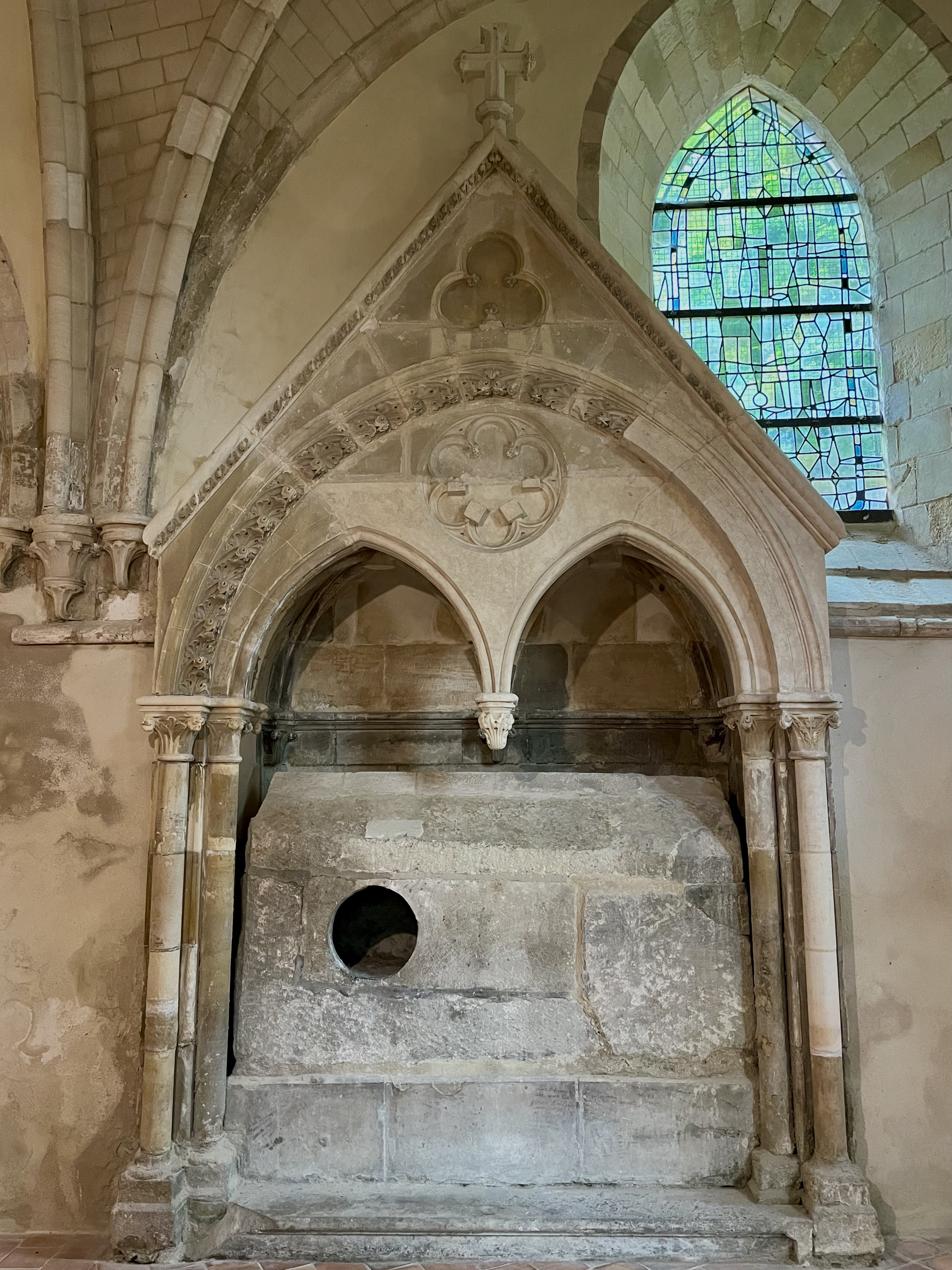
Sarcophagus of Saint Honorine at the Abbey of Graville

The Abbey is dedicated to Saint Honorine. According to the legend, Honorine of Melamare was martyred by the pagans of Lillebonnen in 303, burned in Tancarville, and thrown into the water of the Seine River. Her body is believed to have been found in the harbor of l'Eure and put into a sarcophagus, which was then buried near the Abbey. However, the excavations as well as the historical and archeological research in the region have shown that this legend is far from being true. According to the researchers, most probably in the 6th century the relics of Saint Honorine were sent from the Cathedral of Bayeux to Graville due to the threat of Normand invasion from the west. Thus, the legend about the body found in Eure is not quite accurate. Once the relicts were received, they were put into a sarcophagus, which was placed in the gothic choir of the Abbey. According to Abbot Cochet, an archaeologist and historian of the 19th century, the sarcophagus could have been built at the end of the Roman period or at the start of the Merovingian epoch. Later, due to frequent invasions by the Vikings in the region throughout the 9th century, the relics were transferred to Conflans-Sainte-Honorine in 989, nevertheless, the sarcophagus was preserved at the Abbey and can be still found in the church to the left from the altarpiece. Even though the body of the saint was no longer kept at the Abbey, the sarcophagus has remained an attraction for pilgrims since the Middle Ages.

The Abbey was classified as a historical monument in 1850.

In 1926, the Abbey was converted into a museum, which is still housed there at the present time.

== The Architecture of the Abbey ==
The church of the Abbey is classified as a monument of Romanesque style, which was dominant in Catholic Europe during the time when the church was founded. However, some parts of the church were rebuilt and restored due to the damages caused during the religious wars in the 16th century, a fire in 1787, the First World War, and bombardments during the Second World War. Thus, since the Abbey has been reconstructed multiple times, some elements of later architectural styles can be observed as well.

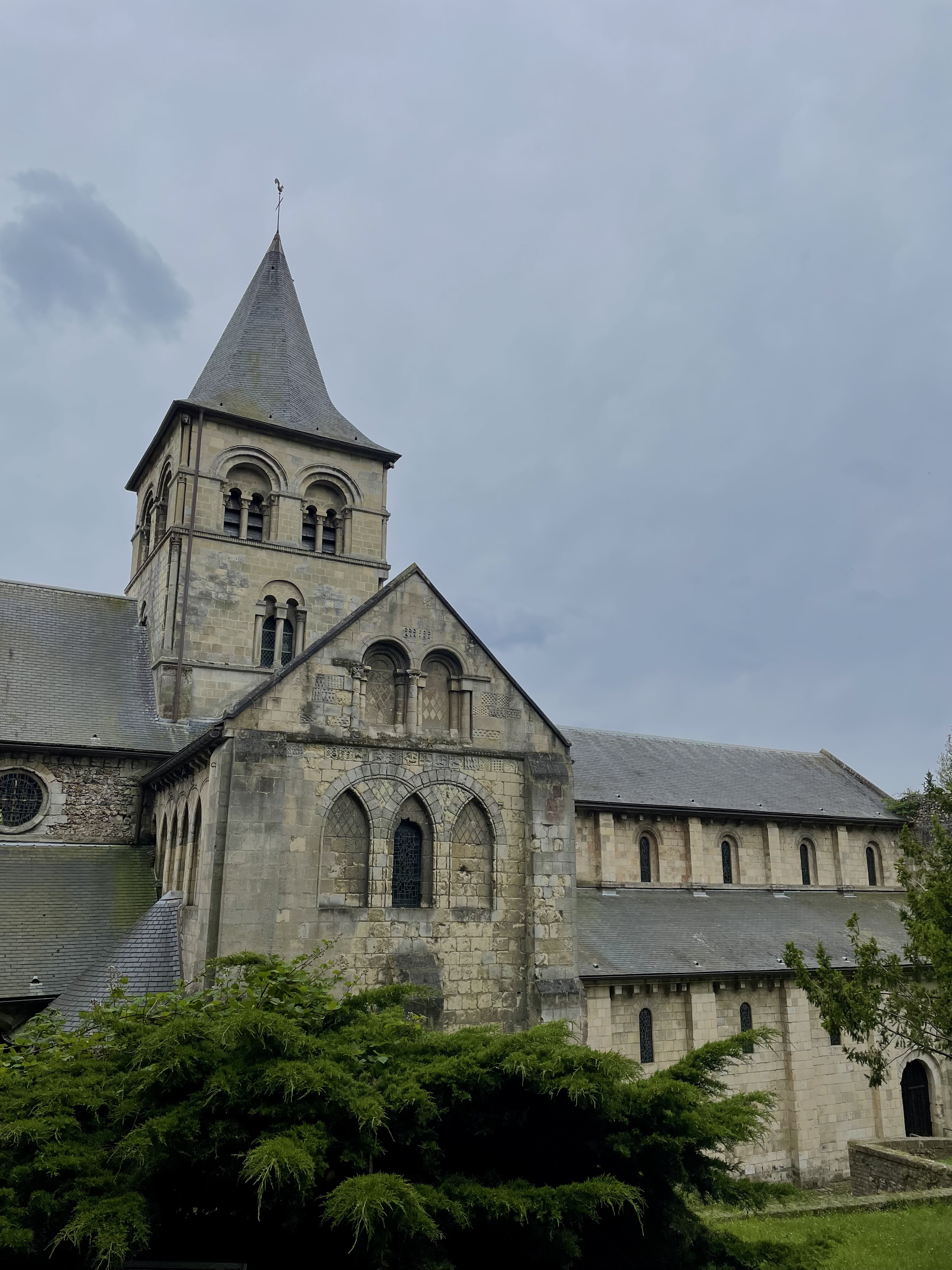
View of the Northern Side of the Abbey of Graville

The capitals of the church also differ on the southern and northern parts of the building. On the former, they are figuratively decorated, while on the latter, they were completed in a Carolingian style with simple buds. The two-story crossing tower (now the belfry) rests on a square and is decorated with domed windows, zigzag patterns, and recessed stars. According to the model of Normandy churches, the church of the Abbey was supposed to have two towers; however, one of them was demolished to prevent it from being used as an observation point by the English during the Hundred Years War, while the south tower collapsed during the religious war in 1563.

The central nave comprises six bays framed by narrow aisles, which lead to the transept and gothic choir built in the 13th century (reworked in the 19th and 20th centuries). They are interconnected by round arches resting on pillars with thin, round rods. The spare spaces above the arches are decorated with a network pattern. The windows of the south part of the building were reworked in the 16th century, while the north ones were bricked up. The original stained glasses were damaged during the First and Second World Wars and could not be restored.

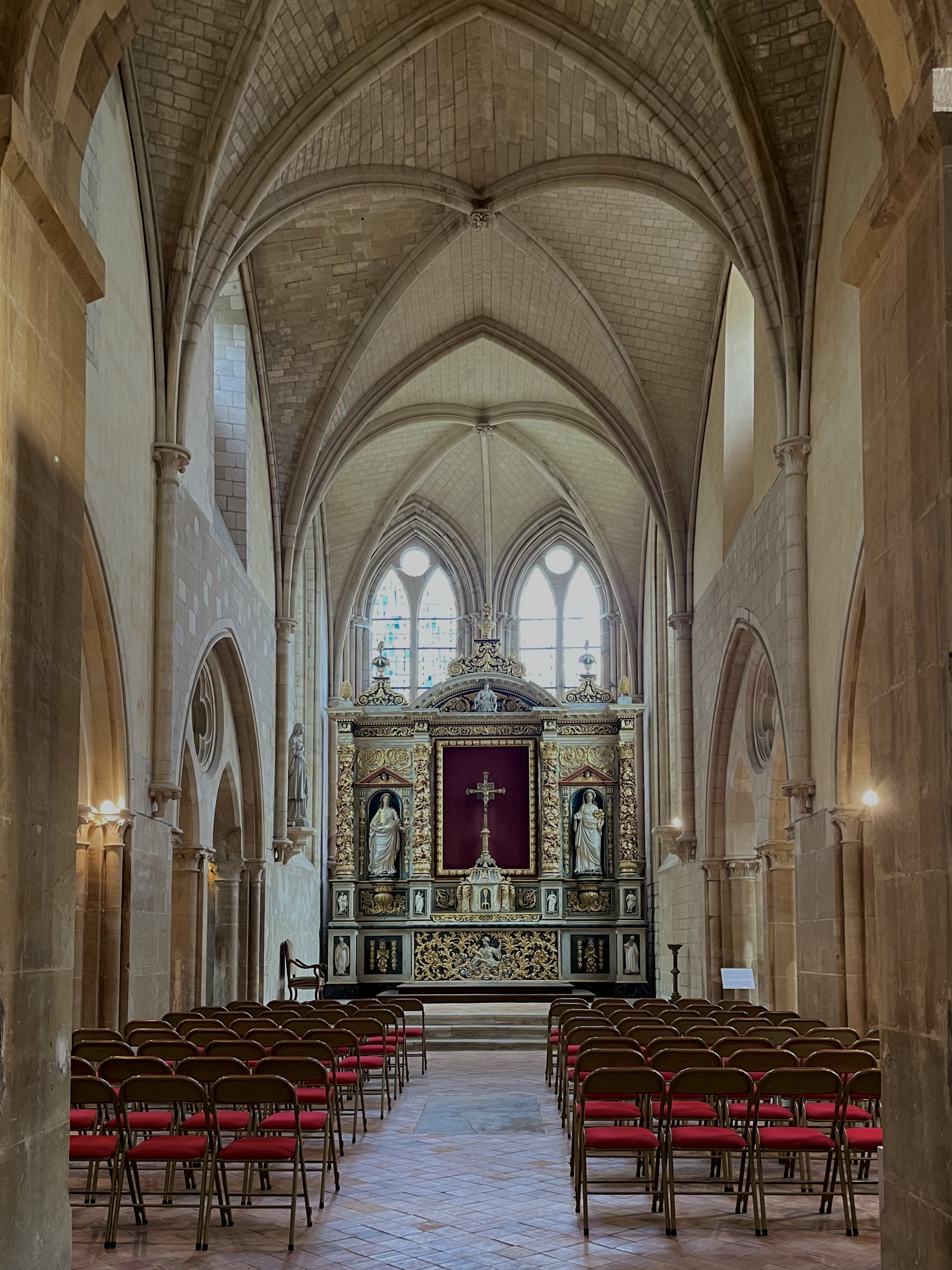
Retablo and the choir at the church of Abbey of Graville

Inside the church, the retablo was reworked in Baroque style during the Genovese intervention in the 1640s. At the same time, the church was divided into two parts, one dedicated to the canons and the other to the parishioners. The retablo includes columns decorated with grape vines and birds, which symbolize the Eucharist and life. The two statues depict Saint Honorine (who can be recognized by a horn with flowers) and Saint Barbara (with a tower as her symbol).

== Collection ==
A permanent exhibition of religious statues is displayed in the conventual buildings. It includes artworks from the 14th and 19th centuries illustrating the richness of the cultural heritage of the Abbey. The collection includes sculptures of the Virgin and Child, Jesus Christ, and saints. The collection also includes liturgical objects and medieval lapidaries. The latter comprise four gravestones, which were found in 1856 during excavations at the church of Saint Nicolas of l'Eure in Le Havre. A century later, they were installed in the hall of the Abbey after being kept at the municipal museum.

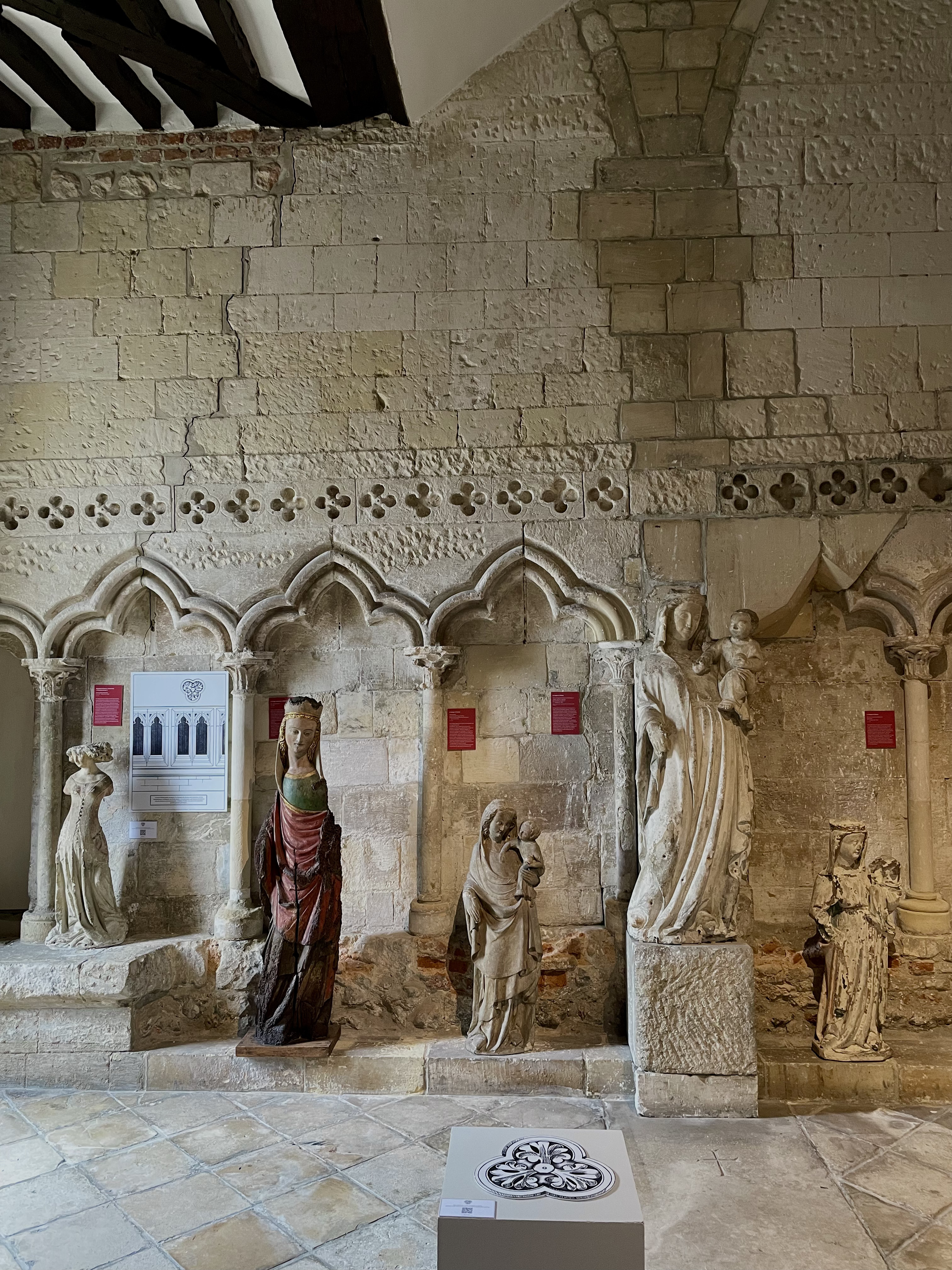
Collection of statues at the Abbey of Graville

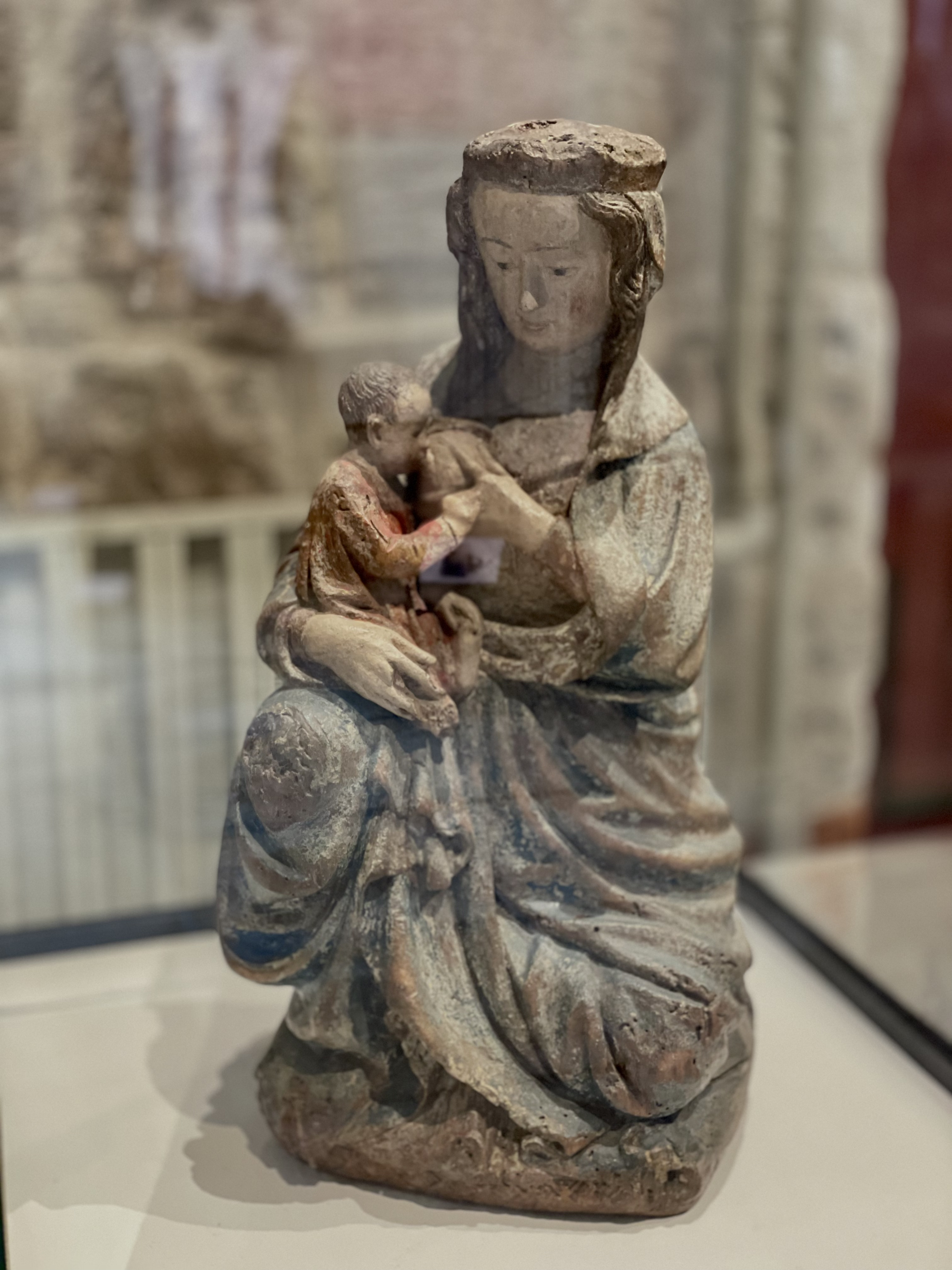
Statue of the Virgin and Child at the Abbey of Graville

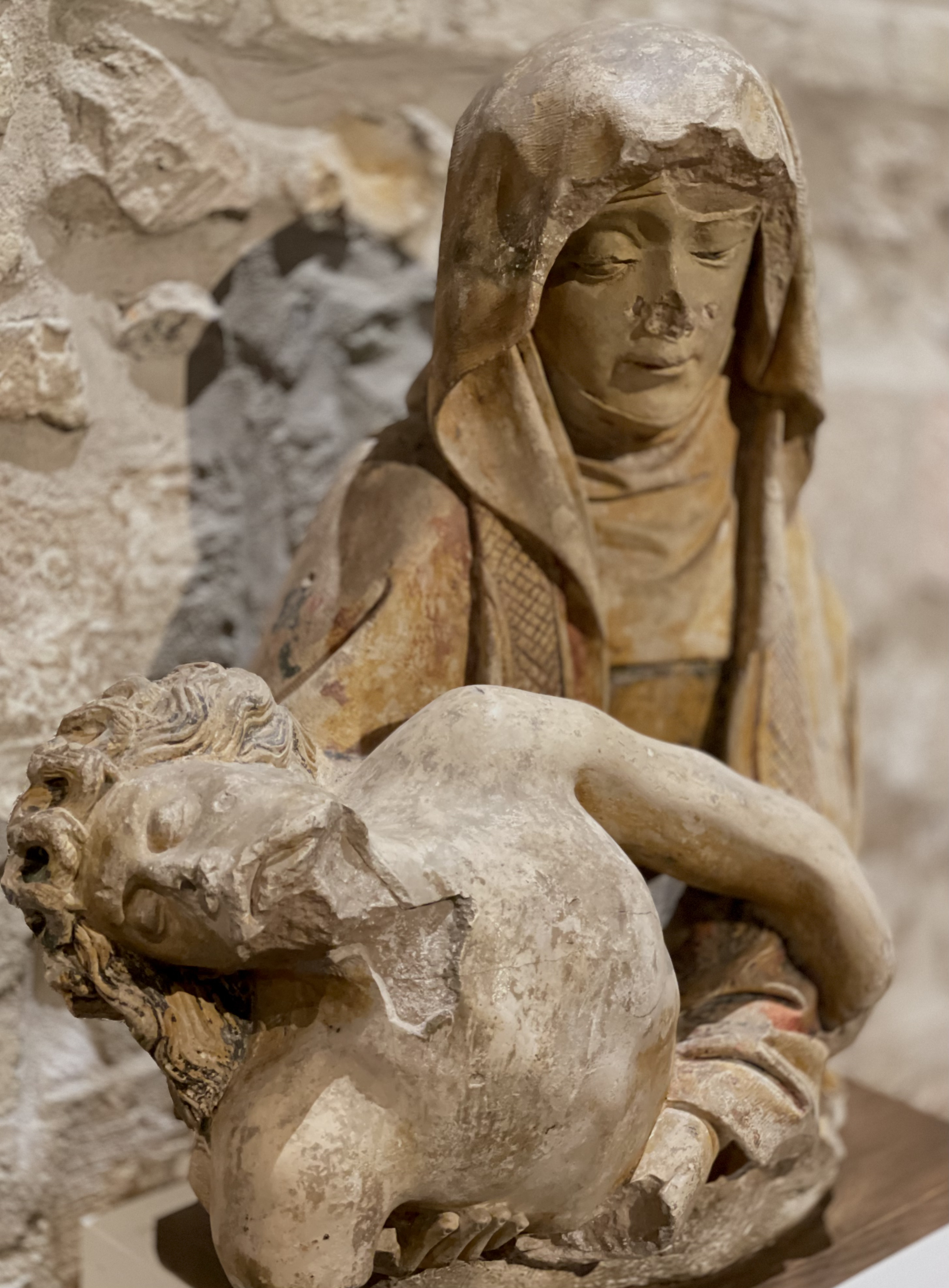
Pieta statue at the Abbey of Graville

In the conventual building at the museum, a collection of architectural models created by Jules Gosselin is on display. Jules Gosselin was born in the Le Havre region in 1863. He created a collection of models presenting the typical French buildings of the end of the 19th and beginning of the 20th centuries. In addition to houses from different regions of France (Caen, Rouen, Honfleur, Colmar, Lisiers, etc.), he included models of homes from other countries such as Egypt, Cambodia, Nepal, etc. The main materials used for this work include timber, cloth, leather, plaster, weaving, and paint. Gosselin's goal with the project was to show "the retrospective history of human settlement". These models are especially valuable since they depict the typical architecture of different regions and provide historically accurate representation of various types of buildings.

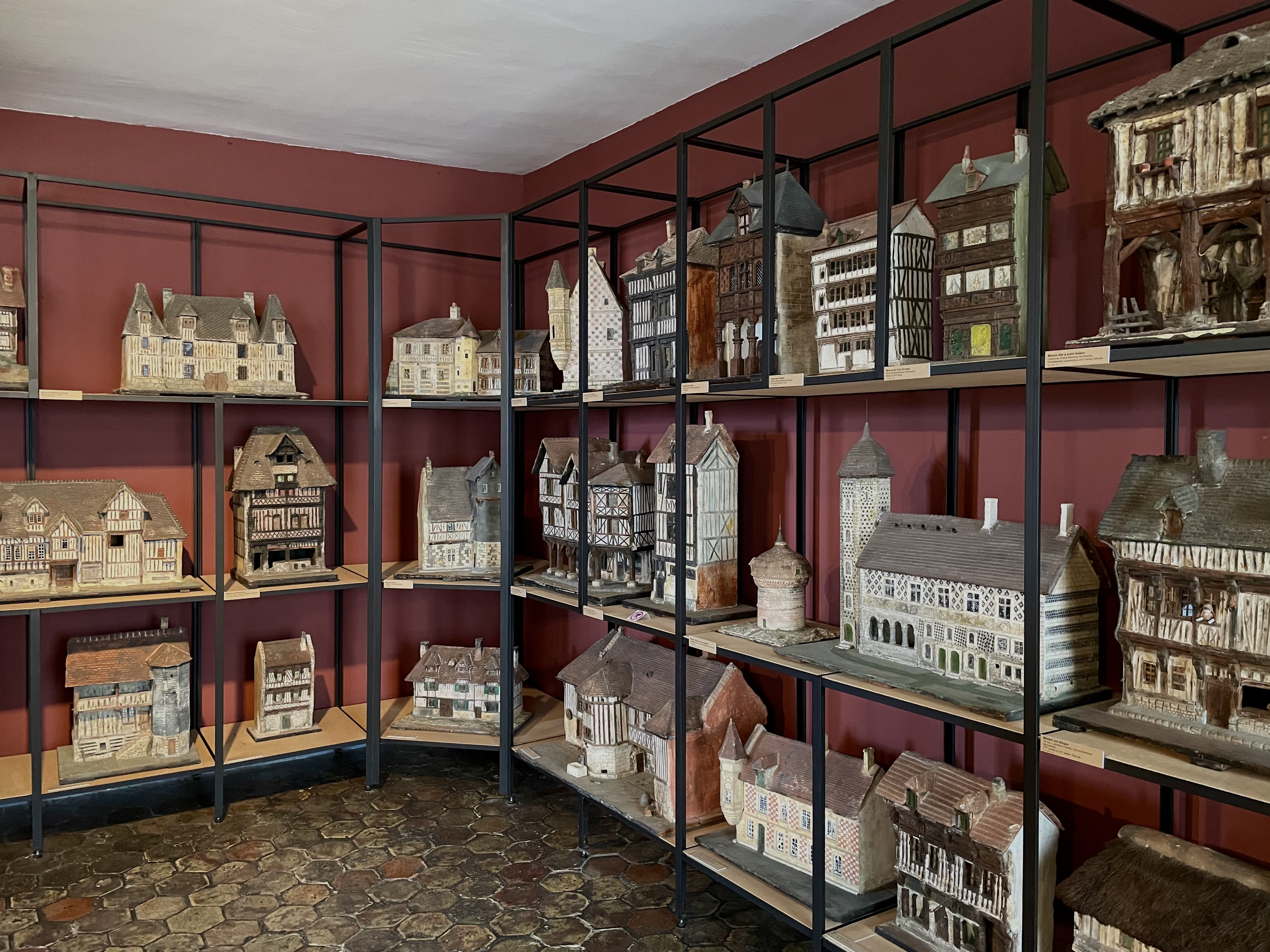
Jules Gosselin collection of house models at the Abbey of Graville

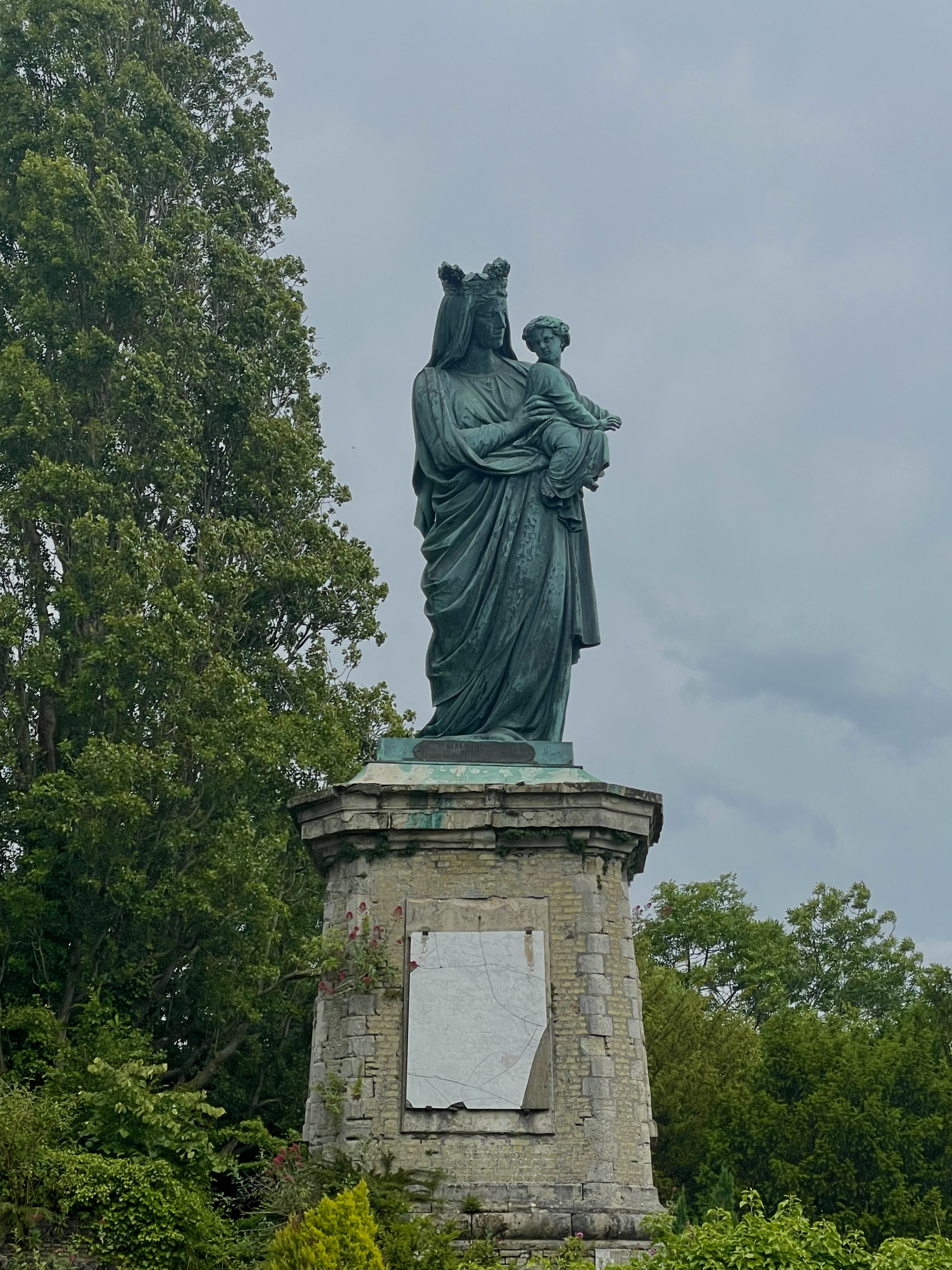
Statue of Black Virgin at the Abbey of Graville

A statue known as the Black Virgin is located on the grounds of the Abbey, overlooking the estuary of the Seine. The story of its creation goes back to the Franco-Prussian War of 1870–1871, when the Prussian army almost occupied Le Havre. The Association of Christian Mothers (under Madame Foache) vowed to erect a statue of the Virgin in gratitude for the city not being invaded. In 1875, a six-meter-tall bronze statue of the Virgin designed by Mr. Robert and Mr. Rousse l was installed. The name of the statue comes from its dark patina, as the bronze was not covered with a layer of silver due to a lack of financial means. During the Second World War, the statue was severely damaged; thus, a new identical one was cast and erected in the same place in 1985, funded by the citizens and the City of Le Havre.

== Gallery ==
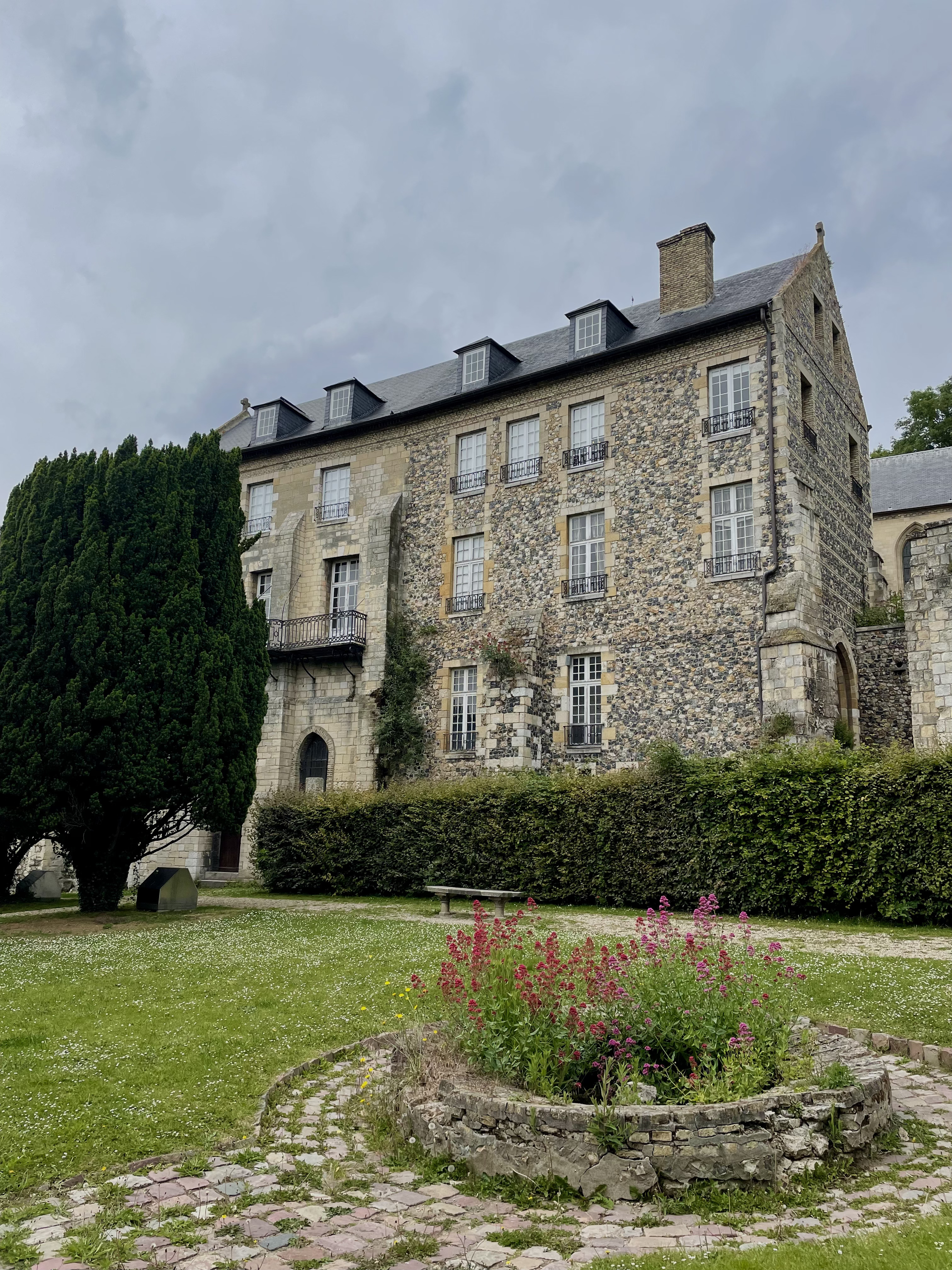
Conventual buildings of the Abbey of Graville

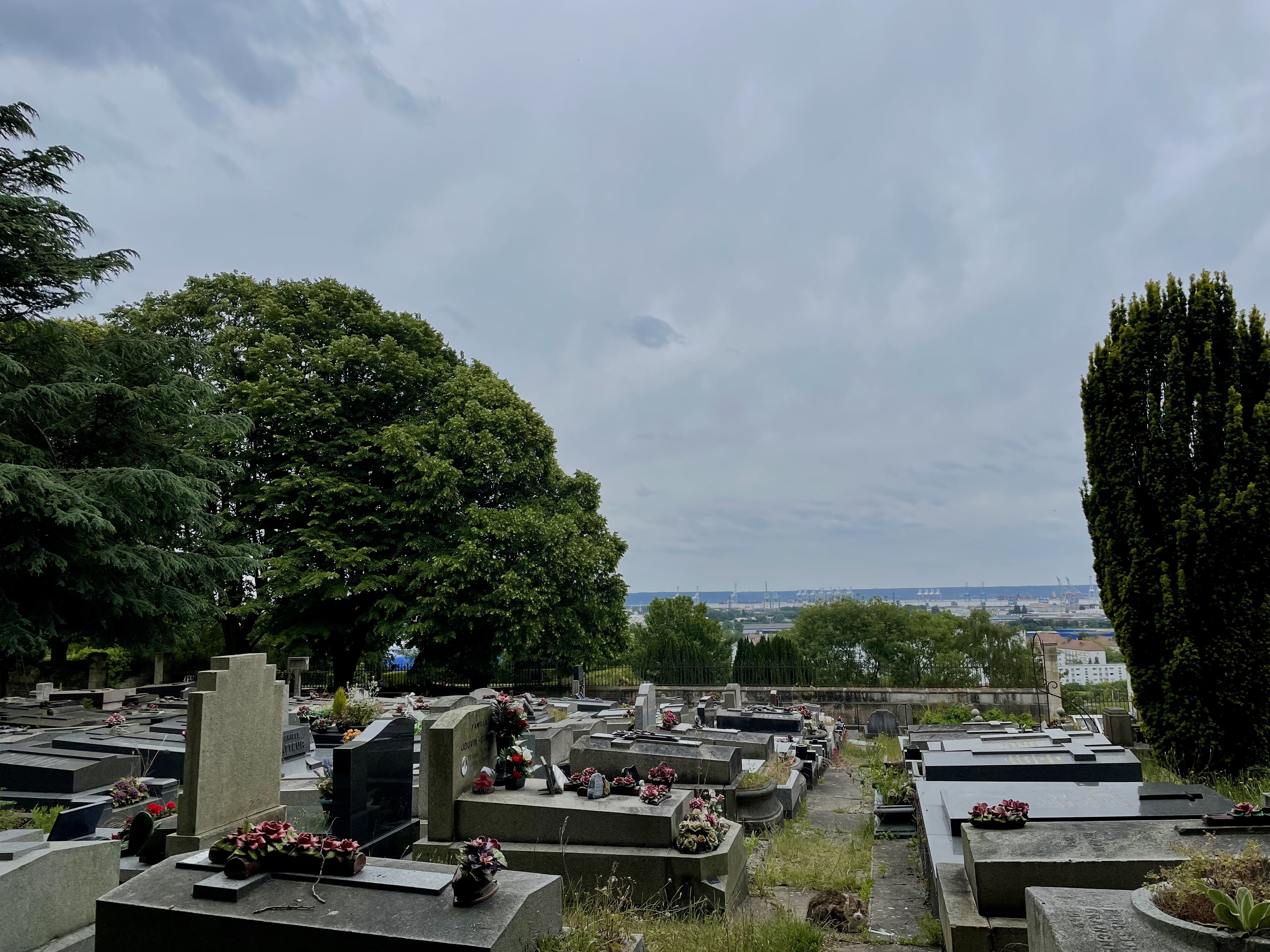
View on the cemetery at the Abbey of Graville

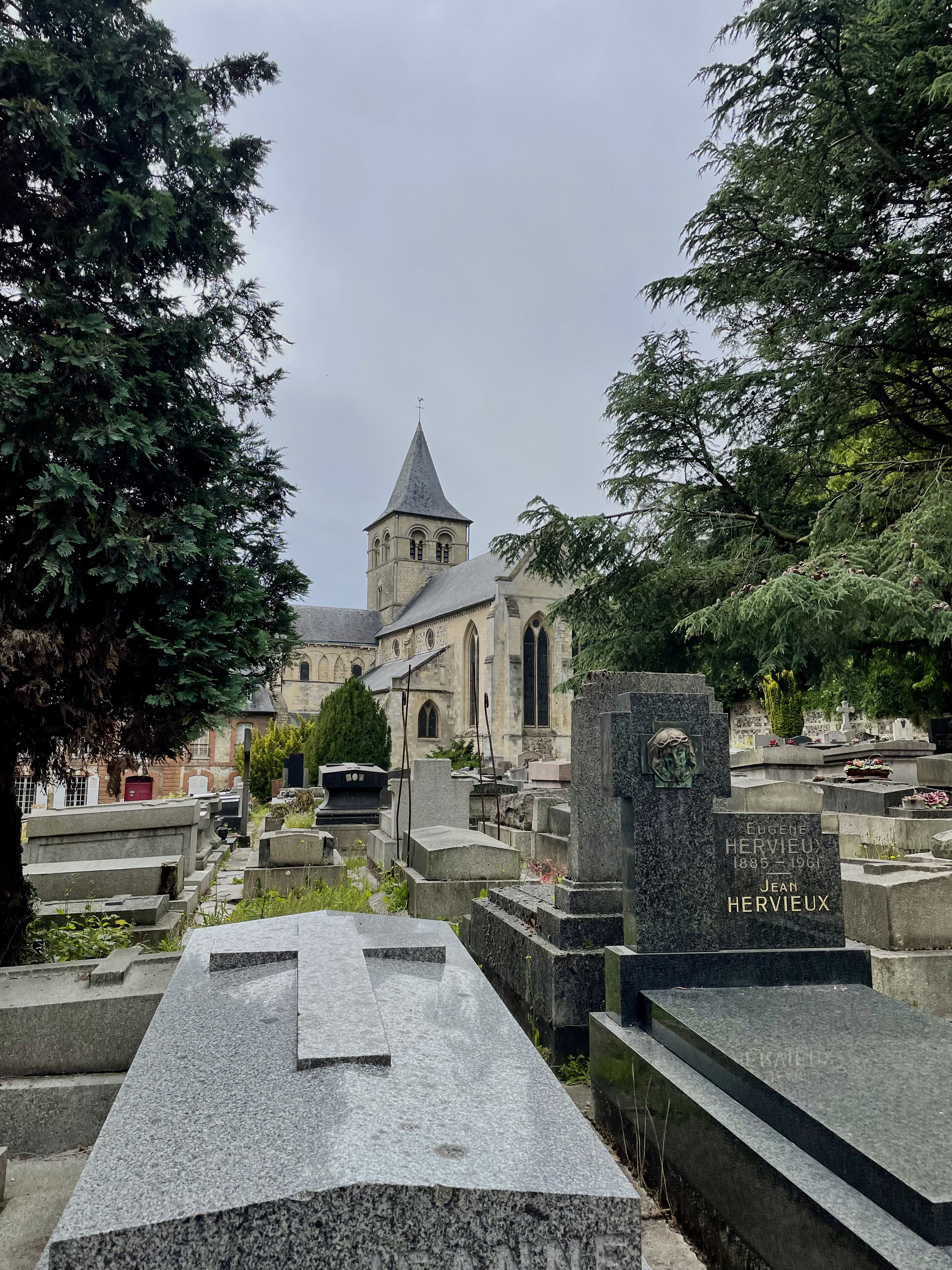
View on the church of the Abbey of Graville from the cemetery

== Bibliography ==
- Aube, B. (2013). Le Havre d'antan, à travers la carte postale ancienne. Paris: Editions Hervé Chopin.
- Carli, F. (2018). Le Havre, petite histoire de l'architecture. Paris: Editions du Cardo. ISBN 978-2-37786-009-8.
- Decultot, G. (1992). Le Havre, les églises. Le Havre: Compo Photo Havre.
- Favennec, Y., Richer, F., & Valinguca, P. (2011). Le Havre en photographies 1860–1910. Le Havre: Éditions du Havre de Grate.
- Kotowicz, J. (2015). François 1er, fondateur du Havre. Louviers: Ysec Editions.
- Inventaire général du patrimoine culturel. (1991). Prieuré Sainte-Honorine dite abbaye de Graville, puis musée du prieuré de Graville.(No. IA76000155).
