= Louis Malet de Graville =

French admiral, politician, and art patron (c. 1440–1516)

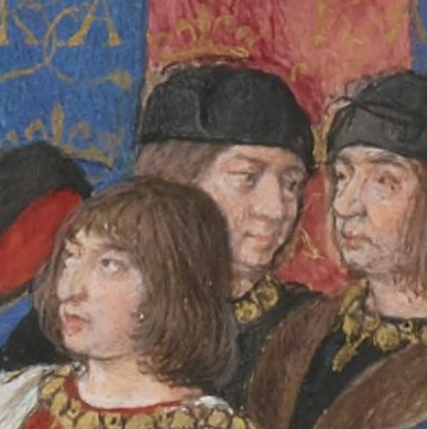
Detail from the frontispiece of Statuts de l'ordre de Saint-Michel, illuminated by Jean Hey around 1493–1494. The depiction of the man in the centre may be a portrait of Louis Malet de Graville.

Louis Malet de Graville (c. 1440 – 30 October 1516) was a French military officer, Admiral of France, politician and art patron. He came from an old family from Normandy; one of his ancestors was William Malet, a companion of William the Conqueror who took part in the Battle of Hastings in 1066. Louis Malet de Graville's father was a counsellor and chamberlain to King Charles VII and Louis XI. In 1463, Louis's father was taken prisoner by English troops. Louis therefore took over some of his father's appointments and began a successful career at the centre of French politics. He would eventually serve four French kings: Louis XI, Charles VIII, Louis XII and Francis I.

Louis XI took Malet de Graville under his wing, and the two developed a close relationship. Malet de Graville rose through the ranks and was given sensitive assignments by the king. He undertook diplomatic missions and participated in military operations. After the death of the king, he continued to serve during the regency of Anne of France and her husband Peter II, Duke of Bourbon. He developed a close relationship with Anne, becoming a central member of the royal council and second in power only to the regents themselves. His steadfast support to the regents during the unrest known as the "Mad War" and the ensuing French–Breton War, organising the military campaign together with Louis II de la Trémoille, secured their benevolence. In 1483, he was given the office of Admiral of France, a prestigious and lucrative position. He was furthermore made governor of Normandy; captain of the ports of Saint-Malo, Dieppe and Honfleur; and knight of the Order of Saint Michael.

Beginning in 1491, Louis was partially side-lined at court, and in 1494 retired for a period to his main estate at Marcoussis. However, his experience and political weight made him to a certain degree indispensable to the crown, and he soon regained many of the positions he had briefly lost. He died on 30 October 1516 at his castle in Marcoussis.

Besides his political and military career, Louis organised modernisation and reconstruction efforts at his holdings, in an attempt to stimulate the economy following the devastation of the Hundred Years' War. He had churches repaired and mills, dovecotes, fish ponds and market halls constructed. Louis was also active as an art patron, and not least book collector. He commissioned several illuminated manuscripts, often sumptuously decorated and of large format, especially on historical subjects and chivalric romance.

== Background ==
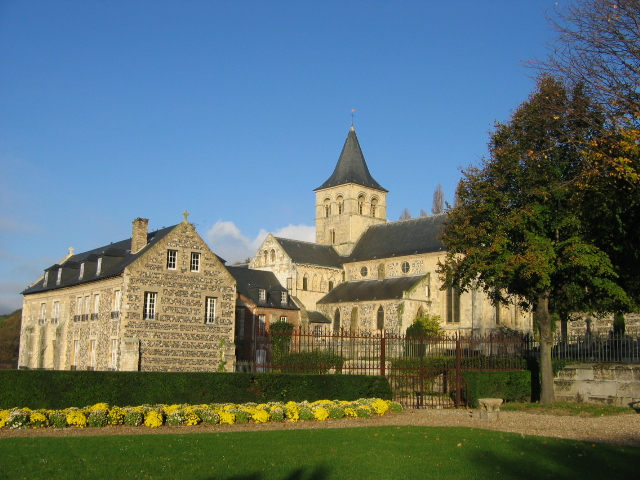
Abbaye de Graville, founded next to the ancestral motte-and-bailey castle of the Malet de Graville family; today part of Le Havre in Normandy.

Louis Malet de Graville came from an old noble family of Normandy, of the Pays de Caux. Tradition holds that one of his forefathers was a companion of Rollo, the first ruler of Normandy. More certain is that William Malet (died 1071), one of the companions of William the Conqueror and who took part in the Battle of Hastings in 1066, was an ancestor. At around the same time, another of his forefathers accompanied Godfrey of Bouillon on the First Crusade. Following the Norman Conquest, the family developed two branches, one French and one English. Another William Malet, probably of the English branch, was a signatory of Magna Carta in 1215.

The French branch established a motte-and-bailey castle at the estuary of the Seine in Normandy, at Graville (today part of Le Havre), by the 11th century. There they resided as vassals of the dukes of Normandy and later the kings of France. The family also established the still extant Abbaye de Graville next to the castle. The first family member of the French side whose life is known in somewhat more detail was Jean III de Malet de Graville, who was sentenced to death and executed in 1356 for having conspired with Charles II of Navarre to overthrow King John II of France. Despite this disgrace, the family soon regained the trust of the royal family. Louis's grandfather, Jean V Malet de Graville, was one of the companions of Joan of Arc and was given the titles of Grand Falconer of France and Master of Crossbowmen by King Charles VII of France. (Note: In French: grand fauconnier de France and grand maître des arbalétriers) He married Jacqueline de Montaigu, whereby the family came into possession of considerable holdings also in Île-de-France. By the middle of the 15th century, the family had amassed large estates, notably in Normandy and Hurepoix, south-west of Paris.

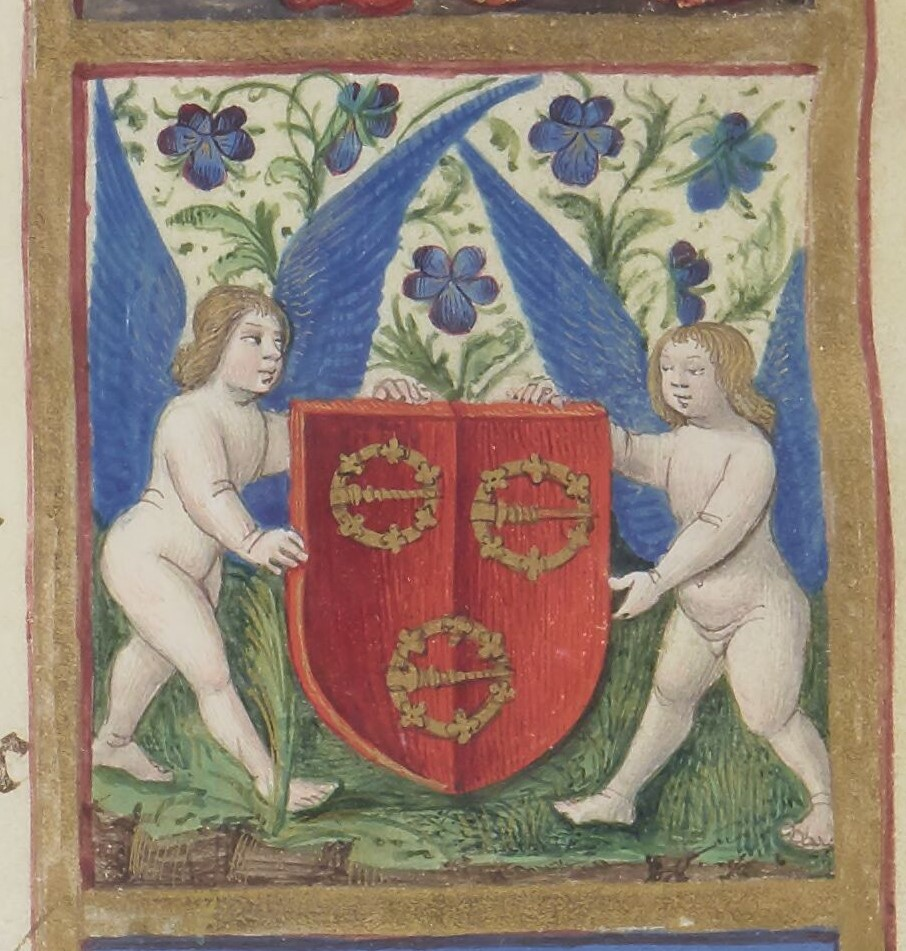
The coat of arms of Malet de Graville in one of the illuminated manuscripts Louis commissioned.

The coat of arms of Malet de Graville's family depicts three golden clasps or buckles on a red background; or, in heraldic terms, gules, three buckles or. (Note: In French: de gueules à trois fermaux d'or) It dates to at least the 13th century, and derives its tincture from the colours of Normandy, red and gold. Louis had his illuminated manuscripts and the buildings he built or repaired heavily decorated with his coat of arms. It is often displayed together with one or several anchors, symbols indicating his elevated rank as Admiral of France. That he entertained a personal interest in heraldry is further reflected by his ownership of the oldest preserved illustrated armorial of France, the Armorial Le Breton, which was part of his extensive library.

== Biography ==
=== Early life ===
Louis Malet de Graville was most probably born in the 1440s. He was the second son of Jean VI Malet de Graville (died 1475), who was counsellor and chamberlain to King Charles VII and later Louis XI. His mother was Marie de Montauban. There is no evidence as to what kind of education Louis received, but it seems plausible he was taught by private tutors at home and later at court. He appears to not have mastered Latin, as all books in the library he would later collect were in French.

Louis's father, Jean VI, had participated in the French attempt to secure the throne of England for Margaret of Anjou during the Wars of the Roses. The expedition, led by Pierre de Brézé, failed, and Jean was taken prisoner by the English in 1463. He would not be released until 1478. With his father absent, Louis took over some of his appointments and began a successful career at the centre of French politics.

=== Political career under Louis XI ===
Louis thus stepped into his father's shoes as an aide to King Louis XI. He was introduced to the court by his uncle, Jean de Montauban. A first recompense for his services to the king is dated 1470. In 1472, possibly to negotiate with the rebellious Count John V, he undertook a trip to the County of Armagnac, a delicate journey indicating that Louis enjoyed a high degree of trust from the king early on. From the following year, Louis is noted with the same titles as his father once had at the court, counsellor and chamberlain. In 1475, he was promoted to the important post of head of the Gentilshommes ordinaires de la Maison du Roi, i.e., the royal lifeguard. In 1476, he was entrusted another delicate assignment which he carried out successfully, namely to convince Charles IV of Anjou to cede part of his inheritance to the French king. The same year, Louis was assigned to be one of the judges in the process against Jacques d'Armagnac, another central part of French politics at the time. He also participated in the military operations following the death of the Duke of Burgundy Charles the Bold in 1477, with the objective of securing former Burgundian lands for the French crown.

Louis XI appreciated Malet de Graville's intelligence as well as his flexible and conciliatory character. The king seems to have taken Louis "under his wing", as Louis's biographer Mathieu Deldicque writes, and in the absence of Malet's own father, the two appear to have developed a kind of father-son-relationship. Louis XI bestowed on Louis the unusual privilege of the right to hunt in the woods of the royal domain.

=== Regency and promotion to Admiral of France ===
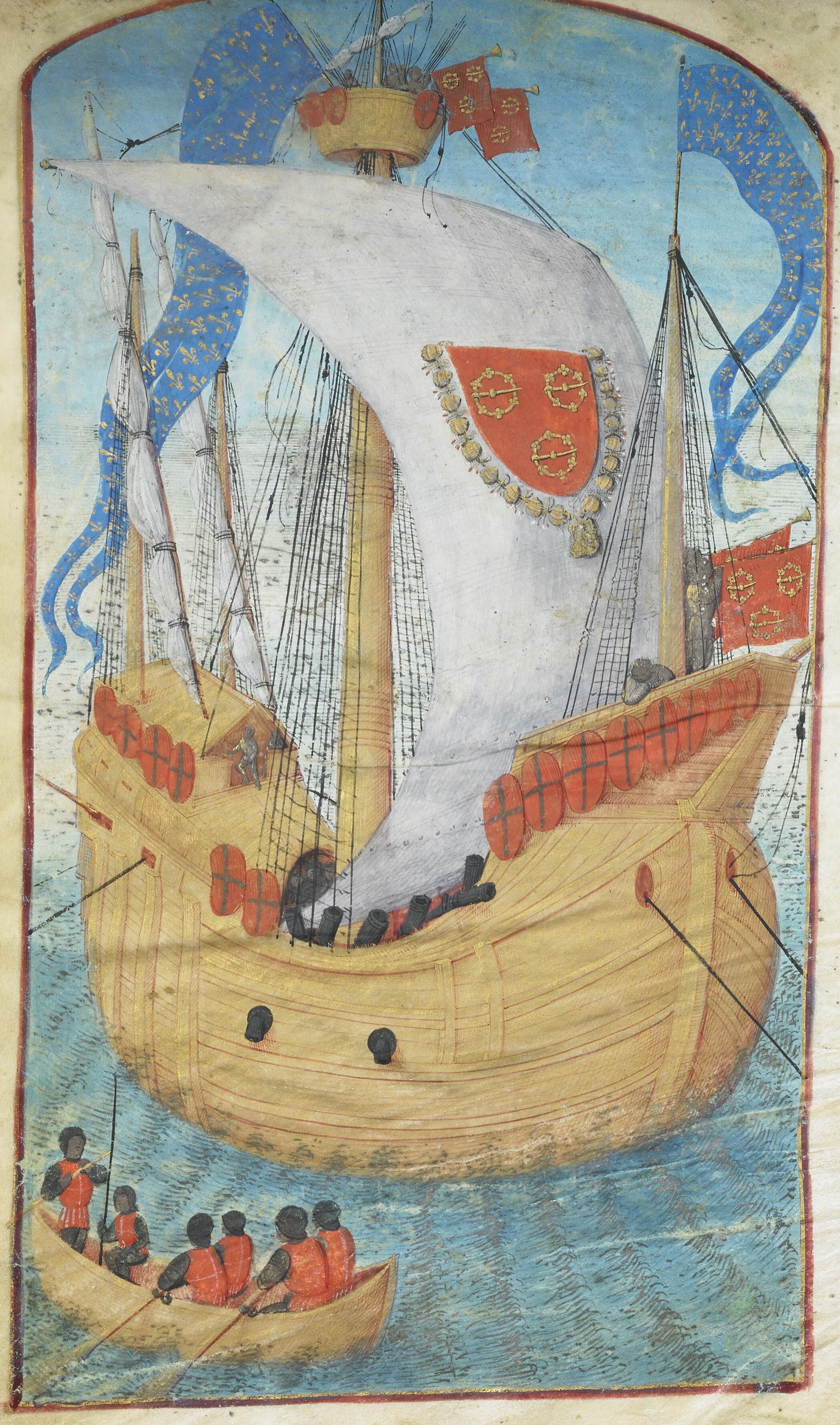
The arms of Malet de Graville surrounded by the chain of the Order of Saint Michael on the sail of a ship; full-page miniature from an illuminated manuscript (Olivier de la Marche's Le chevalier délibéré) previously in Louis's library.

Following the death of Louis XI, France entered a period of regency under Anne of France, sister of the future Charles VIII of France, who at the time was only 13 years old, and her husband Peter II, Duke of Bourbon. The couple ruled the country between 1483 and 1491. During this time, Louis developed a close relationship with Anne, becoming a central member of the royal council and second in power only to the regents themselves. His steadfast support to the regents during the unrest known as the "Mad War" and the ensuing French–Breton War, organising the military campaign together with Louis II de la Trémoille, secured their benevolence.

In 1483, when the position of Admiral of France became vacant, it was offered to Louis. He would retain it until his death, with the exception of the years 1508–1511, when it was held by his relative Charles II d'Amboise. It was a prestigious and lucrative position, one of the Great Officers of the Crown of France and equal in status to the Constable of France. The duties included upholding maritime justice and the suppression of piracy, support to seamen, and the validation of seized prizes; the latter also included the right to a very profitable percentage of the value of all captured goods. The admiral was supported by a general lieutenant, as well as lieutenants in all ports. In practice his authority only included the coastal waters of Normandy and Picardy, since Provence, Brittany and Guyenne were under the authority of regional admirals. Louis was furthermore made governor of Normandy, and captain of the ports of Saint-Malo, Dieppe and Honfleur. In 1493, he was made a knight of the Order of Saint Michael.

=== Temporary fall from grace ===
In 1491, the erstwhile rebellious Duke of Orléans was released from captivity and reconciled with the royal family. The same year, King Charles VIII married Anne of Brittany, daughter of the Duke of Brittany whom Malet de Graville had been instrumental in defeating during the French–Breton War. The disputing factions thus reconciled, but also brought a certain antagonism towards Louis to the court. He lost the governorship of Normandy, and a quiet agreement was made among several high-ranking members of court, including his earlier benefactor Anne of France, to not support the admiral.

Furthermore, Louis was fiercely opposed to the military campaign in Italy which was being planned at the time. His opposition appears to have been a mix of genuine concern about leaving France exposed to English and German incursions as well as part of a power-play in the court. His critical stance further distanced him from the young king and his entourage. In early 1494 he therefore retired to his châteaux at Malesherbes and Montagu, and focused much of his energy on reconstruction projects and commissioning art.

=== Last years ===
Though he was to some extent sidelined, his experience and political weight made him to a certain degree indispensable to the crown. He was relatively quickly reimposed as governor of Normandy, and soon also of Picardy, and entrusted the defence of the realm in the absence of the king in Italy. Already in 1496 he was already back at his seat on the royal council. After the death of Charles VIII and the ascent to the throne of Louis XII, he participated in some of the Italian expeditions, and in 1504 was called upon to make a review of the finances of the realm. Following the death of Charles II d'Amboise in 1511, he was again handed the office of Admiral of France. Upon the death of Louis XII, he entered the service of Francis I of France, who became the fourth monarch he served. He died on 30 October 1516 at his castle in Marcoussis, Château de Montagu.

=== Personal life ===
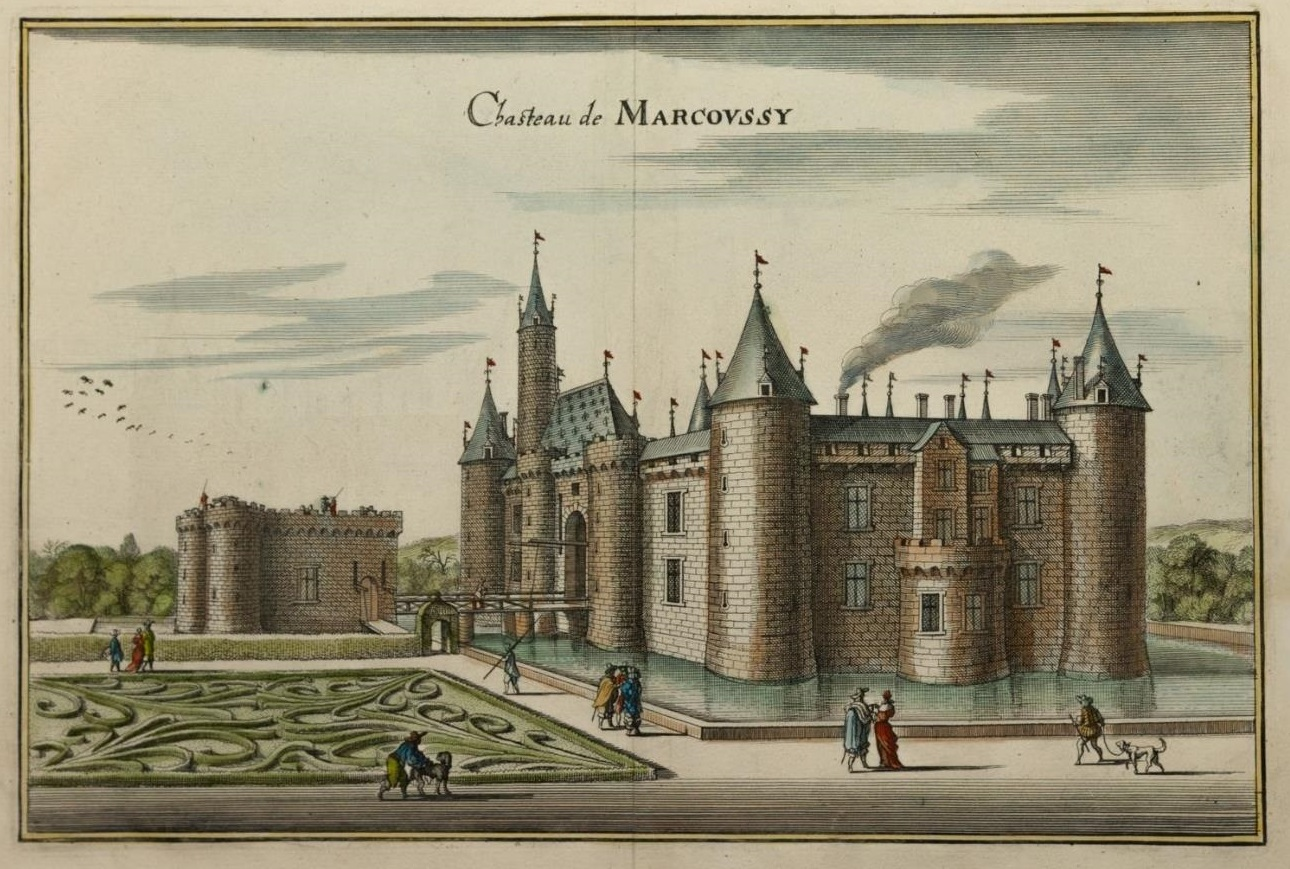
Depiction (1656) of Château de Montagu in Marcoussis, Louis Malet de Graville's main residence

Louis married Marie de Balsac in the 1470s and the couple had five children: two sons, Louis and Joachim, who died young, and three daughters, Louise, Jeanne and Anne. Marie's father Rauffet de Balsac had also served closely to Louis XI, and her uncle Robert de Balsac was a writer and courtier.

The youngest daughter of the couple, Anne de Graville (c. 1490–1540), was a writer, courtier, intellectual and book collector in her own right. Her marriage in 1507 or 1508 with her cousin Pierre de Balsac caused a major conflict with her father, who for a time had her disinherited.

Louis spent an itinerant life, dividing his time between the court and his many estates in Paris, Île-de-France and Normandy. He also had two residences in Paris. His main residence was the Château de Montagu in Marcoussis, which has since fallen into ruin. He had a lavish lifestyle in accordance with his position; he is known to have had a menagerie which contained a monkey, a bear and several birds. His favourite pastime was hunting.

== Legacy ==
=== Reconstruction efforts ===
In France, the second half of the 15th century was a time of reconstruction following the devastation brought upon the country by the Hundred Years' War. Other conflicts, like the War of the Public Weal, had also brought destruction to the areas where Malet de Graville owned land. For example, the churches in Arpajon and Milly-la-Forêt had been burnt by English troops; the church in Arpajon was torched by troops of Edward III of England in 1360 with 900 people inside, and still not fully repaired by the end of the 15th century.

Against this backdrop, Louis undertook several projects to modernise his estates and try to stimulate the economy, though it was not necessarily an immediate reaction to wartime destruction from his side. The estates belonging to his family had also suffered from the long absence of his father in English captivity. Through various projects, starting from the 1480s, Malet de Graville aimed to confirm the ownership of his land, to increase its yield and his income, and to promote an image of himself as a benevolent lord, helping the population.

Many of these reconstruction efforts were centred on his main estate in Marcoussis, but he undertook reconstruction works in many places. For example, the churches in Arpajon, Dourdan, Héricy, Malesherbes, Marcoussis and Milly-la-Forêt, all south of Paris, as well as that of Ingouville in Normandy, were repaired, rebuilt or enlarged thanks to support from Louis between 1470 and 1516. Malet de Graville furthermore engaged in updating the legal framework surrounding the estates, putting local managers in place and reorganising archives. He also built town fortifications, mills, dovecotes, ordered the clearing of old and digging of new fish ponds, and in Arpajon and Milly-la-Forêt built large market halls which are still standing. The impact of the reconstruction efforts of Louis were thus substantial. In Milly-la-Forêt, for example, he financed the construction of the market hall, repaired the church and enlarged the castle he had bought there.

Reconstruction works by Louis Malet de Graville: the example of Milly-la-Forêt

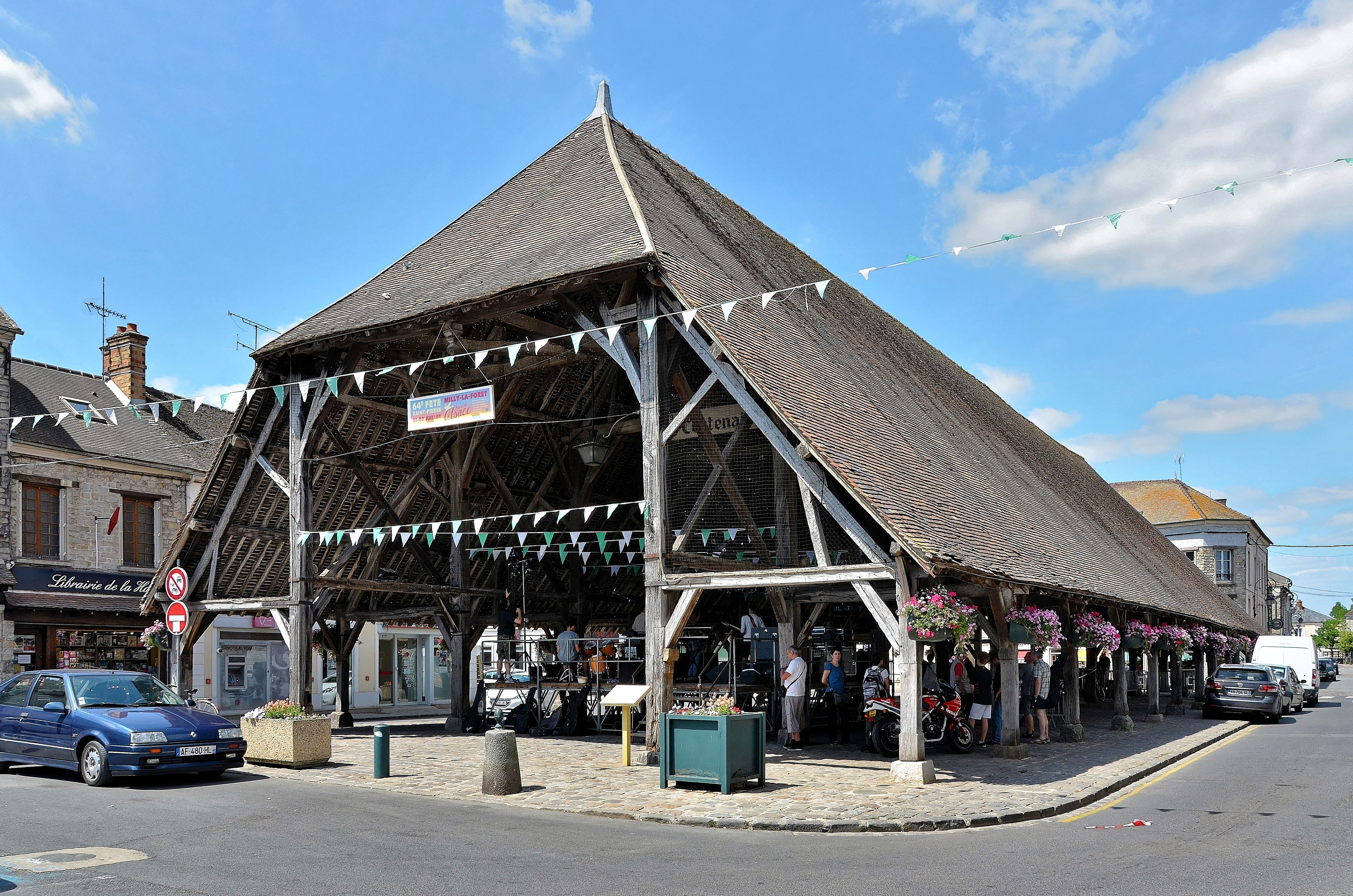
The market hall

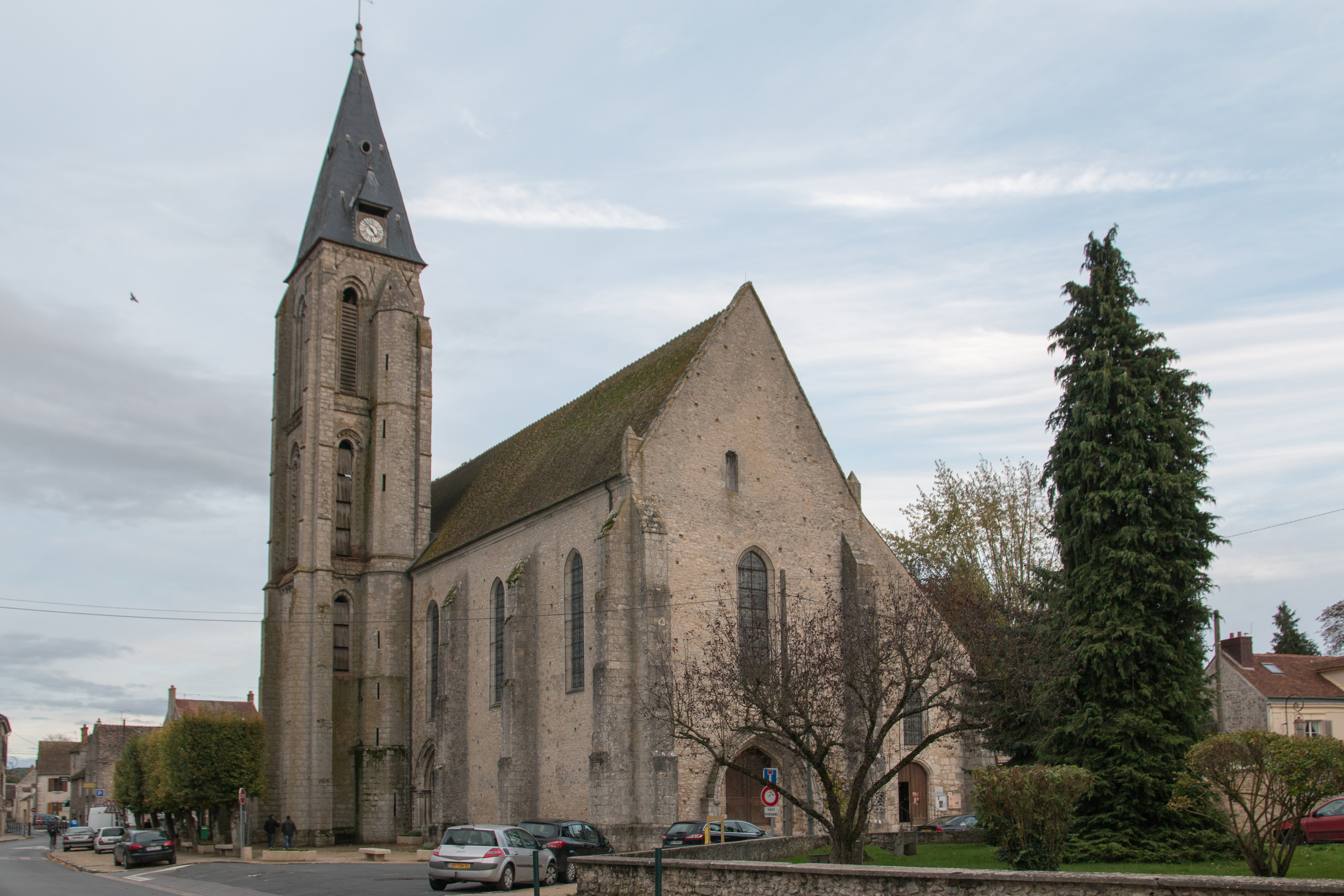
The collegiate church

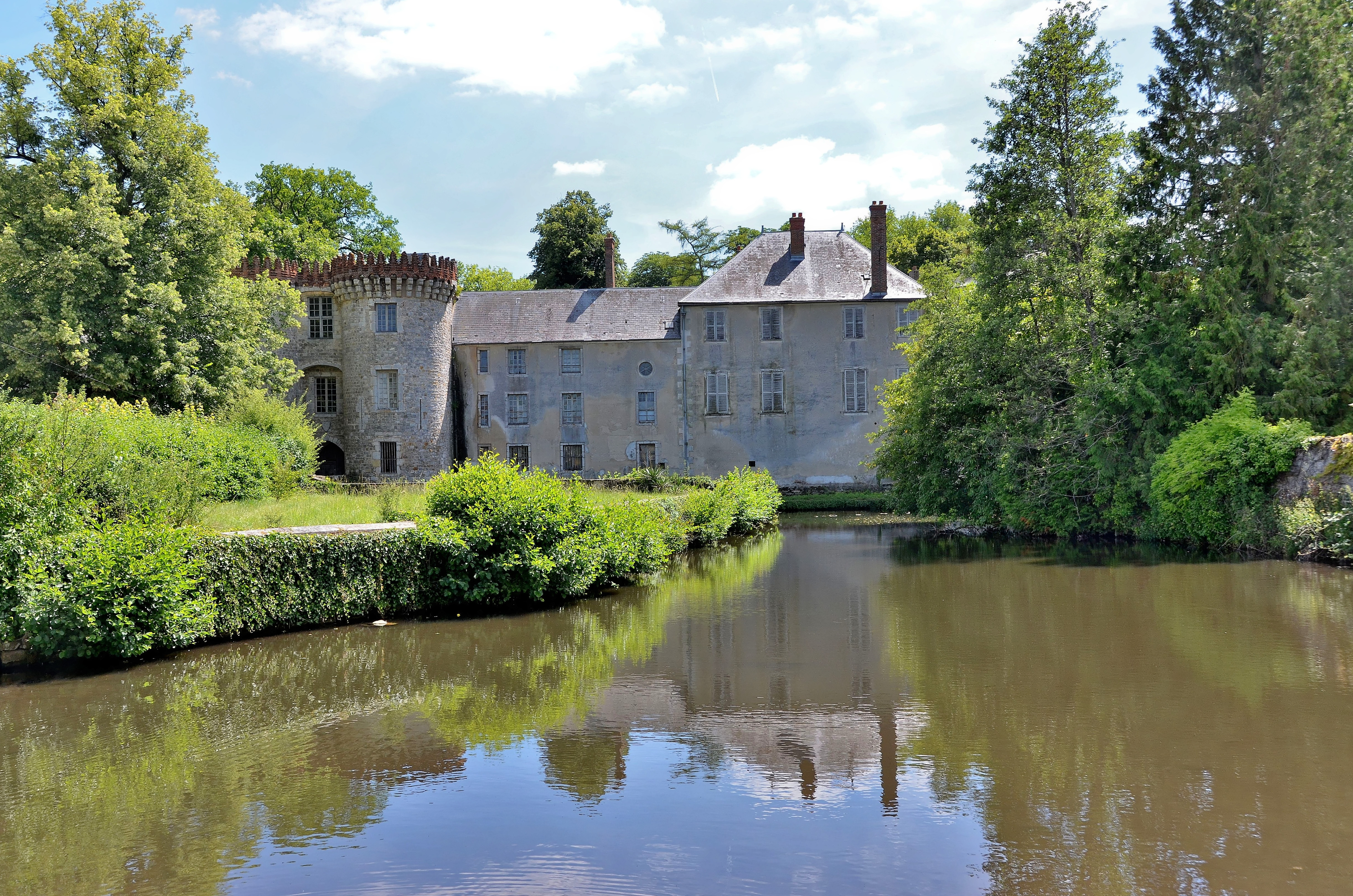
The castle

=== Art patron ===
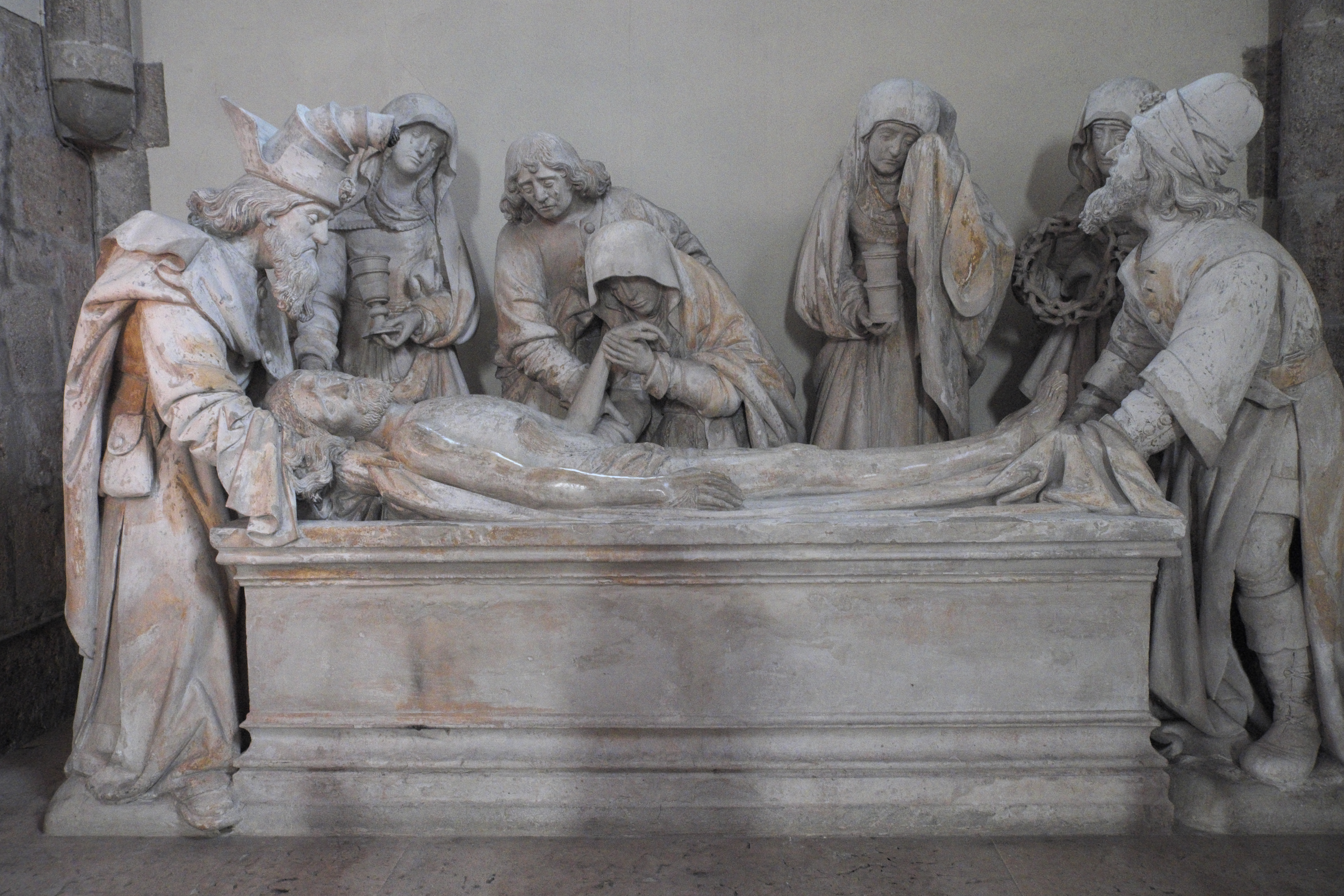
The Entombment, sculpture group ordered in 1495 by Louis Malet de Graville

The activity of Louis also extended to commissioning works of art. Among these is a sculpture group depicting the Entombment of Christ, ordered in 1495 and installed in the chapel of his castle in Malesherbes. The Entombment was made by a sculptor resident in Paris but probably from Antwerp, Adrien Wincart, based on designs by the Coëtivy Master. It has since been moved to the town church in Malesherbes. The French historian Catherine Grodecki described it as one of the most beautiful Entombments from the end of the Middle Ages.

Louis also commissioned sculpted tombstones for his parents, by the sculptor Oudart Trubert, in the church in Graville. He probably also commissioned the tombstone for his grandfather Jean de Montagu in Marcoussis. Louis was also fond of tapestries, and is known to have had several, including one set designed by the aforementioned Coëtivy Master.

=== Book collector ===
Louis was one of the greatest bibliophiles of his times. That his library was remarkably rich in illuminated manuscripts of high quality has been recognised for a long time; the medievalist Antoine Le Roux de Lincy for example wrote enthusiastically about it as early as 1860. There still exist 33 works which can safely be attributed to the library of Louis, but it certainly contained many more. Many of his books were later inherited by his daughter Anne, and her son-in-law Claude d'Urfé. Louis's library consisted almost exclusively in books written in French, and history was apparently his favourite subject, with works on ancient history and chronicles well-represented in his library. The second most well-represented genre was chivalric romance, in particular the Matter of Britain. In other words, his tastes were typical for the old feudal aristocracy. The library of Louis contained almost no religious books. One exception is his own book of hours, which is preserved in the Huntington Library in San Marino, California. However, given the sumptuous decoration, large format and rich bindings of the books he commissioned, it was clearly also an expression of his art patronage. Louis' interest in book collecting was apparently shared by his wife.
