= Hôtel de Ville, Conflans-Sainte-Honorine =

Town hall in Conflans-Sainte-Honorine, France

Hôtel de Ville
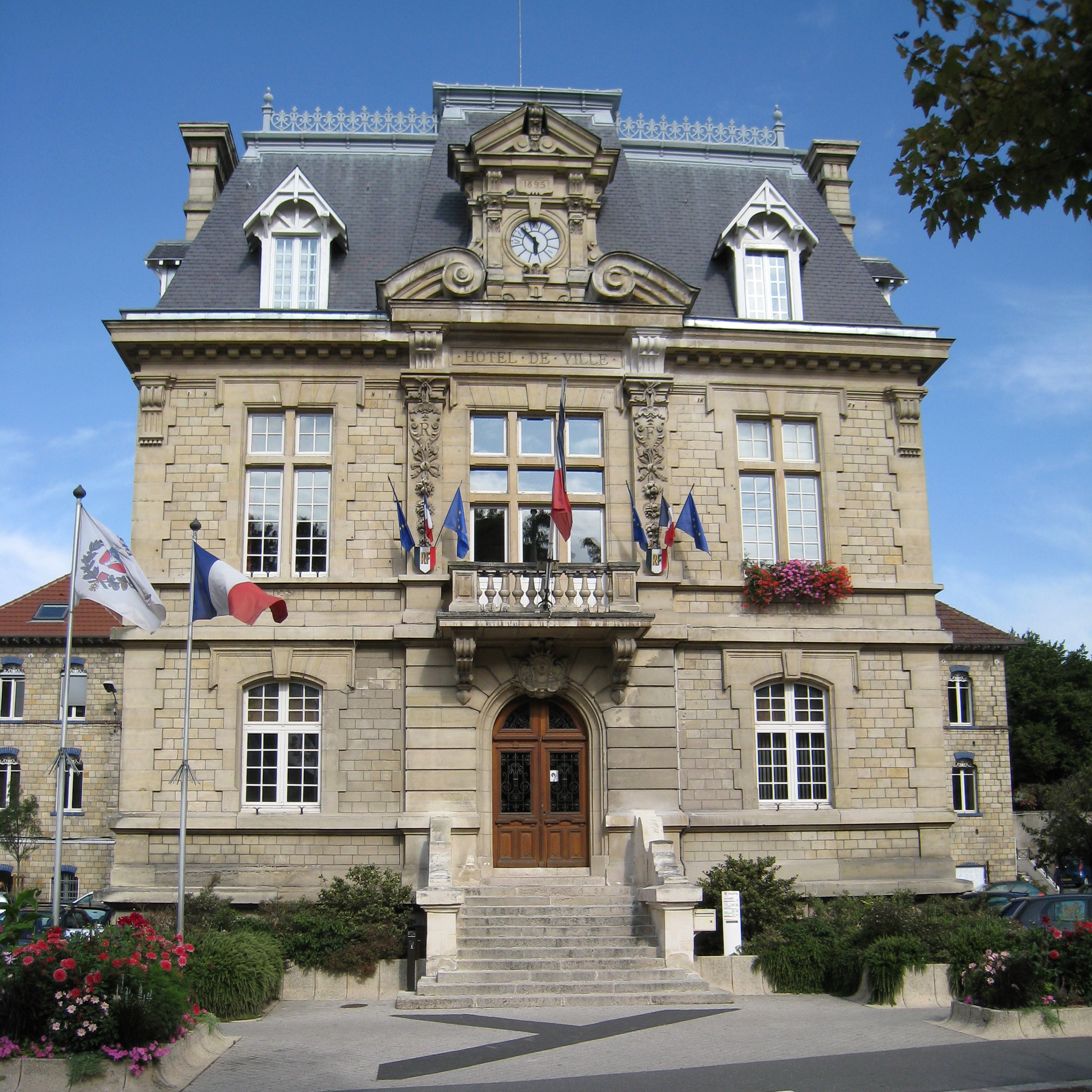
- The main frontage of the Hôtel de Ville in September 2008
- Interactive map of the Hôtel de Ville area

General information
- Type: City hall
- Architectural style: Neoclassical style
- Location: Conflans-Sainte-Honorine, France
- Coordinates: 48.9937°N 2.0947°E
- Completed: 1895

Design and construction
- Architect: Théophile Bourgeois

The Hôtel de Ville (French pronunciation: [otɛl də vil], City Hall) is a municipal building in Conflans-Sainte-Honorine, Yvelines, in the northwestern suburbs of Paris, standing on Rue Maurice Berteaux. It has been included on the Inventaire général des monuments by the French Ministry of Culture since 2002.

== History ==
Following the French Revolution, the town council initially met in the home of the mayor at the time. This arrangement continued until 1849 when a combined town hall and school was established in what is now Place Fouillère. In 1882, the local seigneur, Simon Chapellier, left FFr 50,000 francs in his will to erect a new town hall and school. The site the council selected for this development was on the northwest side of what is now Rue Maurice Berteaux, close to the Château du Prieuré.

The new building was designed by Théophile Bourgeois in the neoclassical style, built in ashlar stone and was completed in 1895. The design involved a symmetrical main frontage of three bays facing onto the street. The central bay featured a short flight of steps leading up to a round headed doorway with voussoirs and an elaborate keystone. There was a large mullioned and transomed window with voussoirs, a keystone and a balustraded balcony on the first floor. The first-floor window was flanked by ornate Doric order pilasters supporting an entablature, a cornice and a clock which was supported by scrolls and flanked by pilasters supporting a triangular pediment. Behind the clock, there was originally an octagonal belfry. The outer bays were fenestrated by segmental headed windows with voussoirs, keystones and hood moulds on the ground floor, by cross-windows with voussoirs, keystones and hood moulds on the first floor, and by dormer windows at attic level. At that time the building was flanked by Espalier orchards.

Meanwhile, the local school relocated into two new blocks, one for boys and the other for girls, erected immediately behind the town hall to a design by Jules Grapin and completed in 1898. After the children were transferred to new buildings in the villages of Fin d'Oise and Chennevières in 1920, these two blocks were occupied by the technical services department of the council. The belfry was demolished in 1975.

In December 2024, the mayor, Laurent Brosse, initiated a programme of works costing €289,455 to erect a transparent pergola, designed by Daniel Buren, which would protect members of the public visiting the town hall. A further major programme of works costing €3.8 million, to insert a new municipal block between the former school blocks, was also unveiled. The design, prepared by l'Atelier PNG Architecture, incorporated a new Salle du Conseil (council chamber) within the proposed development. However, implementation of the proposals was postponed due to legal proceedings.
