= Mélamare =

- Commune
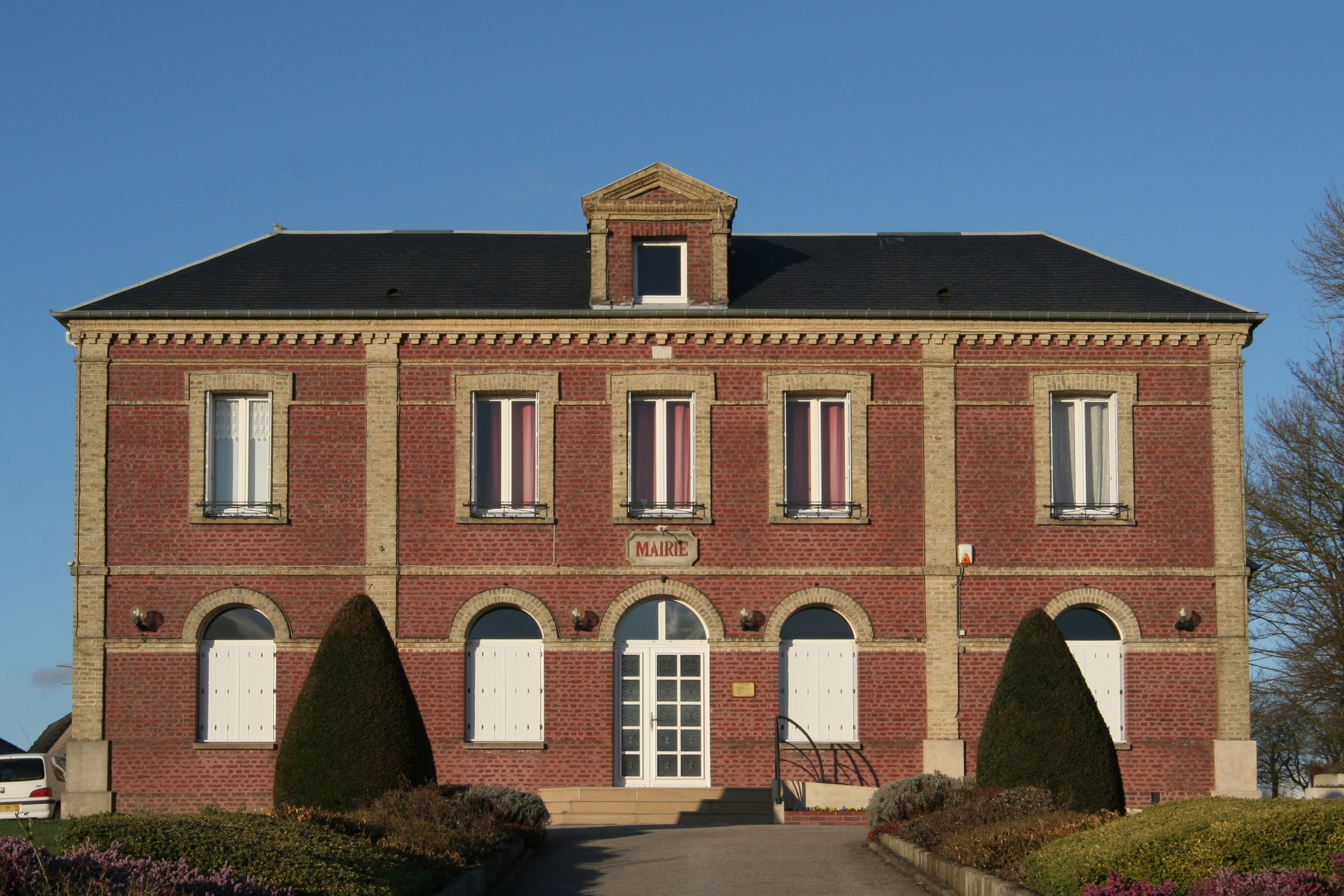
- The town hall in Mélamare
- Location of Mélamare
- Location within France Location within Normandy
- Coordinates: 49°32′18″N 0°27′05″E
- Country: France
- Region: Normandy
- Department: Seine-Maritime
- Arrondissement: Le Havre
- Canton: Bolbec
- Intercommunality: Caux Seine Agglo

Government
  - Mayor (2020–2026): Bernard Verdière
- Area^{1}: 6.35 km^{2} (2.45 sq mi)
- Elevation: 115 m (377 ft)
- Highest elevation: 136 m (446 ft)
- Lowest elevation: 60 m (200 ft)
- Population (2023): 938
  - Density: 148/km^{2} (383/sq mi)
- Time zone: UTC+01:00 (CET)
  - Summer (DST): UTC+02:00 (CEST)
- INSEE/Postal code: 76421 /76170
- ^{1} French Land Register data, which excludes lakes, ponds, glaciers > 1 km^{2} (0.386 sq mi or 247 acres) and river estuaries.

Mélamare (French pronunciation: [melamaʁ]) is a commune in the Seine-Maritime department in the Normandy region in northern France.

== Geography ==
A farming town in the Pays de Caux, situated some 14 miles (23 km) east of Le Havre, near the junction of the D34 and D312 roads.

== History ==
Tradition holds that Saint Honorina (Sainte-Honorine) was martyred here in 303AD. There is a chapel dedicated to her in the town. The town name was recorded as Mellomara in the thirteenth century. After the revocation of the Edict of Nantes, Protestantism survived here clandestinely.

== Population ==
Historical population
Year	Pop.	±% p.a.
1968	432	—
1975	408	−0.81%
1982	711	+8.26%
1990	762	+0.87%
1999	751	−0.16%
2007	757	+0.10%
2012	796	+1.01%
2017	889	+2.23%
2023	938	+0.90%
Source: INSEE

== Places of interest ==
- The thirteenth century chapel of St. Honorine.
- The church of St.Jacques-et-Sainte-Anne, dating from the twelfth century.
- An old windmill.

== See also ==
- Communes of the Seine-Maritime department
