= Honorina =

Gallo-Roman saint (died 303)

Saint Honorina
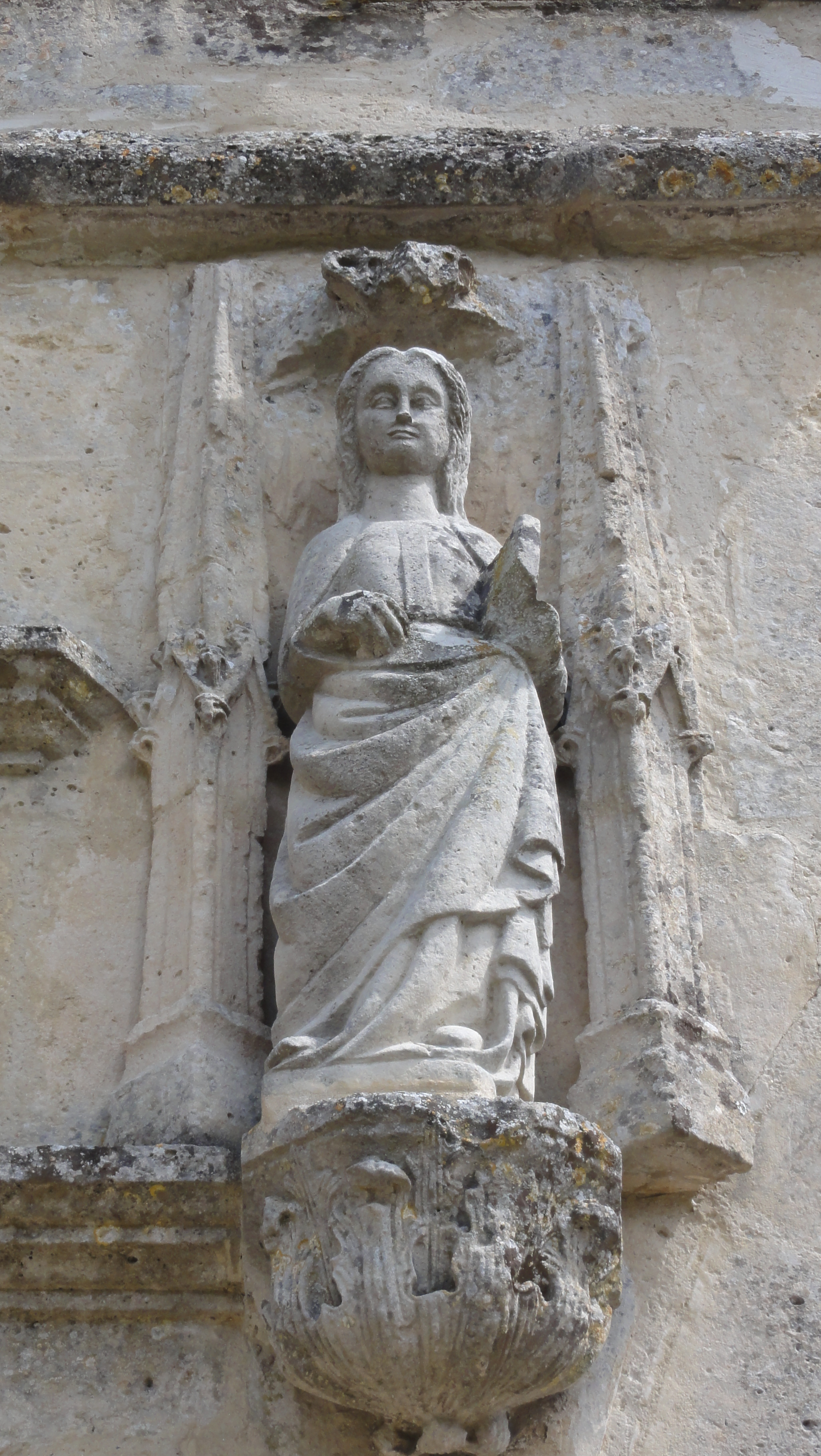
- Statue of St Honorina at a church in Corbeil-Cerf
- Born: 3rd century
- Died: c. 303; Northern France
- Venerated in: Eastern Orthodox Church; Roman Catholic Church
- Canonized: Pre-congregation
- Major shrine: Chapelle Sainte-Honorine in the Church of Saint Maclou at Conflans-Sainte-Honorine
- Feast: 27 February
- Attributes: Palm of martyrdom; chain or shackle held in the hand
- Patronage: Boatmen and sailors, prisoners and captives; the commune of Conflans-Sainte-Honorine

Saint Honorina (French: Sainte Honorine) was a 3rd-century virgin martyr of Gallo-Roman northern France, venerated as a saint in the Catholic and Eastern Orthodox Churches. Believed to have been killed in the first years of the 4th century during the persecutions of Diocletian, very little is known of her life, apart from her reputed martyrdom for maintaining her Christian faith.

She is one of the earliest martyrs of Gaul, still revered in northern France, especially in Normandy and Île-de-France, where there are a number of communes, chapels and churches named for her. The commune of Conflans-Sainte-Honorine, where her relics are kept in the parish church of Saint Maclou, claims her as their patron saint. She is also the patron saint of sailors and boatmen of inland waterways. Prisoners and captives traditionally invoke her name in praying for aid. Her feast day falls on 27 February.

== Tradition ==
In the traditional account, Honorina belonged to the Gallic tribe of Calates from the Pays de Caux region. Martyred during the persecutions of Diocletian, near the modern farming town of Mélamare, between Lillebonne and Harfleur, her body was thrown into the Seine by the pagans. It drifted to Graville, later called Graville-Sainte-Honorine, which is now a district of the modern city of Le Havre. Reputedly, local Christians recovered Honorina's remains, first burying them at the foot of a cliff nearby; later, monks reinterred her remains in a reliquary, housed in a church they built to honour her. Other traditions hold that she was martyred at Coulonces, Calvados, or in the Pays d'Auge, where several villages bear her name.

== Relics ==
A community of monks established a priory in the 5th century at Graville-Sainte-Honorine, where they built a church dedicated to Saint Honorina, moving her relics there. In 876, with the coast threatened by the Normans, the monks moved the relics for safekeeping. The reliquary was transported inland, to a fortress at the confluence of the Seine and the Oise, and placed them in the chapel of the fortress.

In 1080, the priory of Conflans was founded at the site by Benedictine monks from Bec Abbey, probably to provide for pilgrims visiting the relics. During the course of a dynastic struggle for succession to the lordship of Conflans, its wooden castle was destroyed in a siege on 21 June 1082. It was decided that a new church, further from the castle, should be built to house the rescued relics. In 1086, the new church, dedicated to Honorina, was completed. Her relics were solemnly translated there, in the presence of the bishop of Paris and Anselm, the Abbot of Bec Abbey, later the Archbishop of Canterbury and Doctor of the Church. It is from these events that Conflans become known as Conflans-Sainte-Honorine.

== Veneration ==
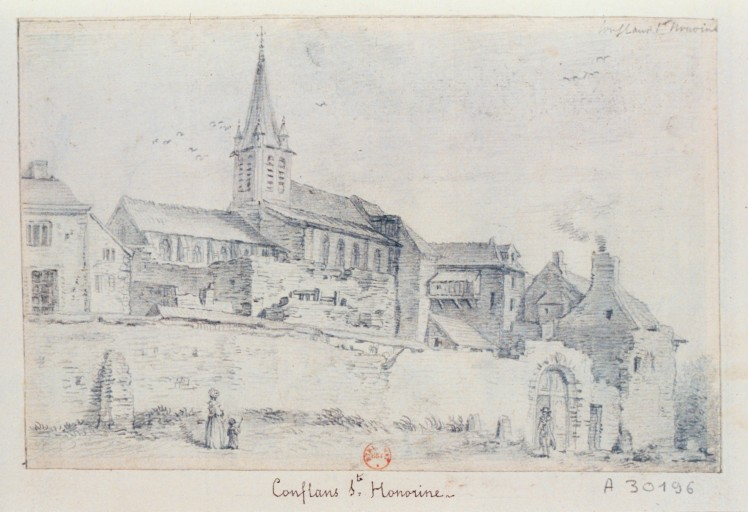
The church of Sainte-Honorine. Conflans-Sainte-Honorine.

A confraternity was founded in her honour in later years, and special indulgences associated with her cult were also approved. Saint Honorina is the patron saint of boatmen, since Conflans-Sainte-Honorine became a port of arrival for the tugs that travel on the rivers and canals of northern France.

Prisoners who were liberated thanks to the divine intercession of Saint Honorina brought their chains as an ex-voto.

A regional pilgrimage, on Ascension Day, developed thanks to the monks of the priory of Conflans, who were associated with Bec Abbey.

There are several French towns that are named Sainte-Honorine.

== See also ==
- Honorine de Graville at the French Wikipedia, (in French)

== Notes ==
=== Sources ===
- The Benedictine Monks of St. Augustine's Abbey, Ramsgate ["The monks of Ramsgate"] (1921). "Honorina (St.) V. M.". The Book of Saints: A Dictionary of Servants of God Canonised by the Catholic Church. London: A. & C. Black Ltd. p. 138. ISBN 978-0-265-23529-4. Digitised and republished online by Forgotten Books, 2022.
- Borrelli, Antonio (13 October 2002). "Sant' Onorina". Santi, beati e testimoni: Enciclopedia dei Santi (in Italian).
- Dagallier, Anne (4 October 2018). "Honorine, une sainte aux précieuses reliques". Diocèse de Versailles (in French). Église catholique en Yvelines.
- Dunbar, Agnes Baillie Cunninghame (1904). "St. Honoria (1) Feb. 27". A Dictionary of Saintly Women. Vol. 1. London: Bell. p. 393.
- Gautier, Vital Jean (1876). Pouillé du diocèse de Versailles. Paris: Chez Victor Palmé. p. 146.
- "The Orthodox Saints of France: 'H'". The Orthodox West: A resource for the Orthodox Saints of Western lands. Orthodox West Initiative.
