= Conflans-Sainte-Honorine =

- Commune
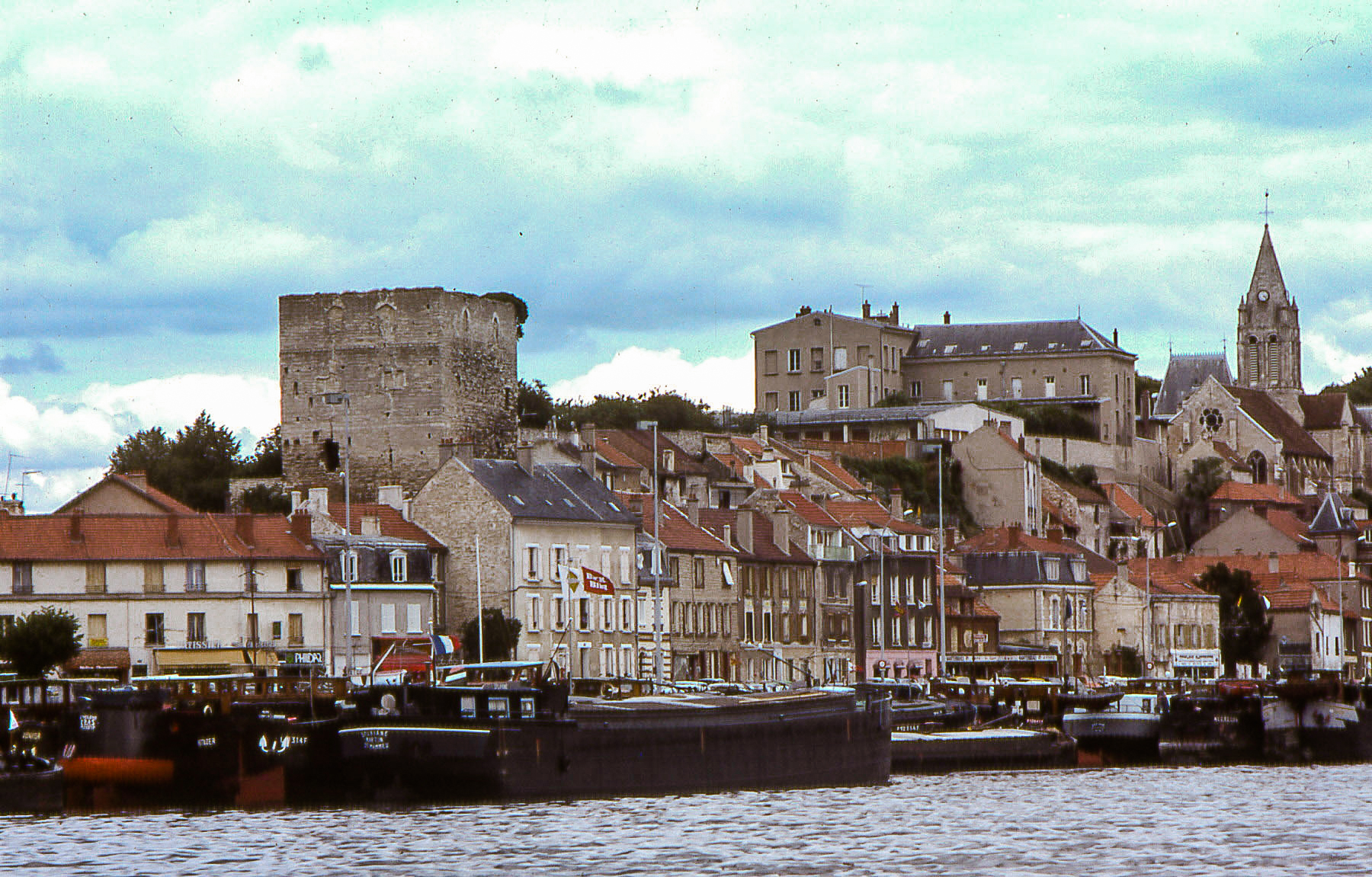
- The historic center of Conflans-Sainte-Honorine

- Coat of arms

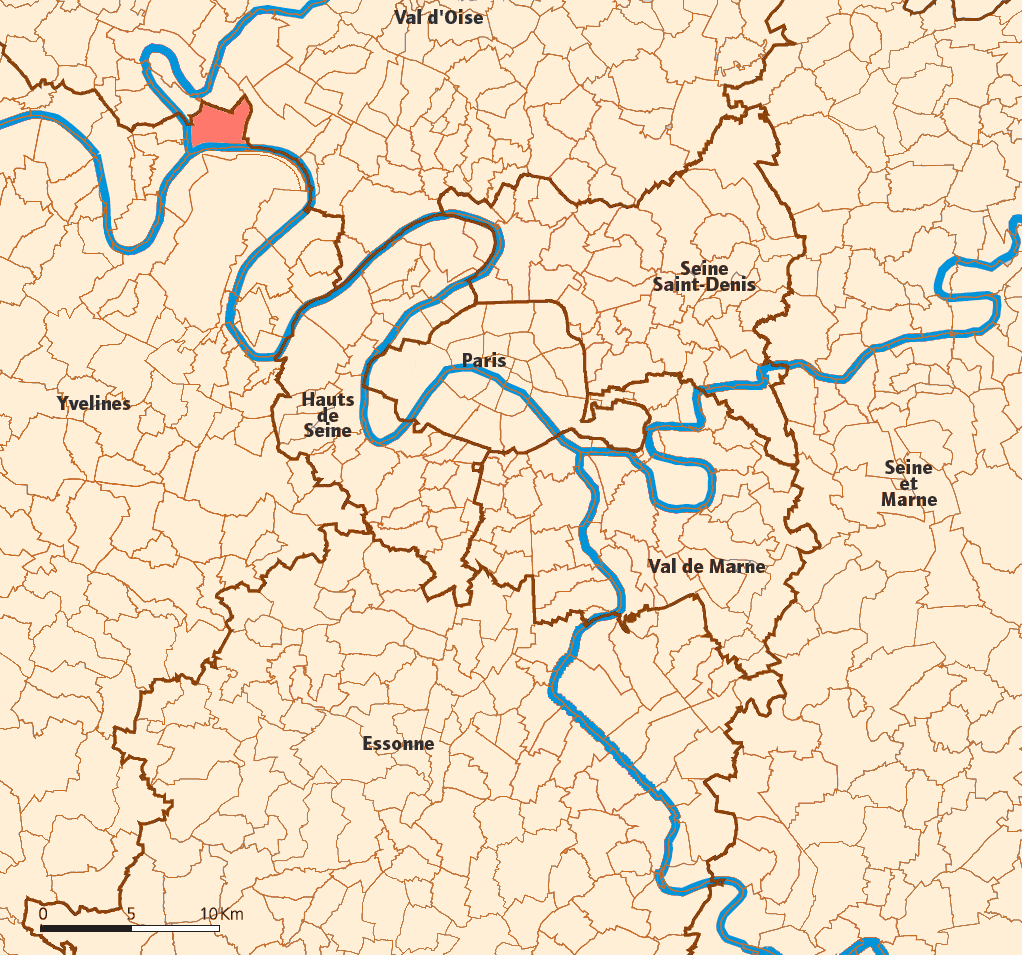
- Location (in red) within Paris inner and outer suburbs
- Location of Conflans-Sainte-Honorine
- Location within France Location within Île-de-France (region)
- Coordinates: 48°59′57″N 2°05′54″E
- Country: France
- Region: Île-de-France
- Department: Yvelines
- Arrondissement: Saint-Germain-en-Laye
- Canton: Conflans-Sainte-Honorine
- Intercommunality: CU Grand Paris Seine et Oise

Government
  - Mayor (2020–2026): Laurent Brosse
- Area^{1}: 9.9 km^{2} (3.8 sq mi)
- Elevation: 25 m (82 ft)
- Highest elevation: 60 m (200 ft)
- Lowest elevation: 17 m (56 ft)
- Population (2023): 36,958
  - Density: 3,700/km^{2} (9,700/sq mi)
- Time zone: UTC+01:00 (CET)
  - Summer (DST): UTC+02:00 (CEST)
- INSEE/Postal code: 78172 /78700
- ^{1} French Land Register data, which excludes lakes, ponds, glaciers > 1 km^{2} (0.386 sq mi or 247 acres) and river estuaries.

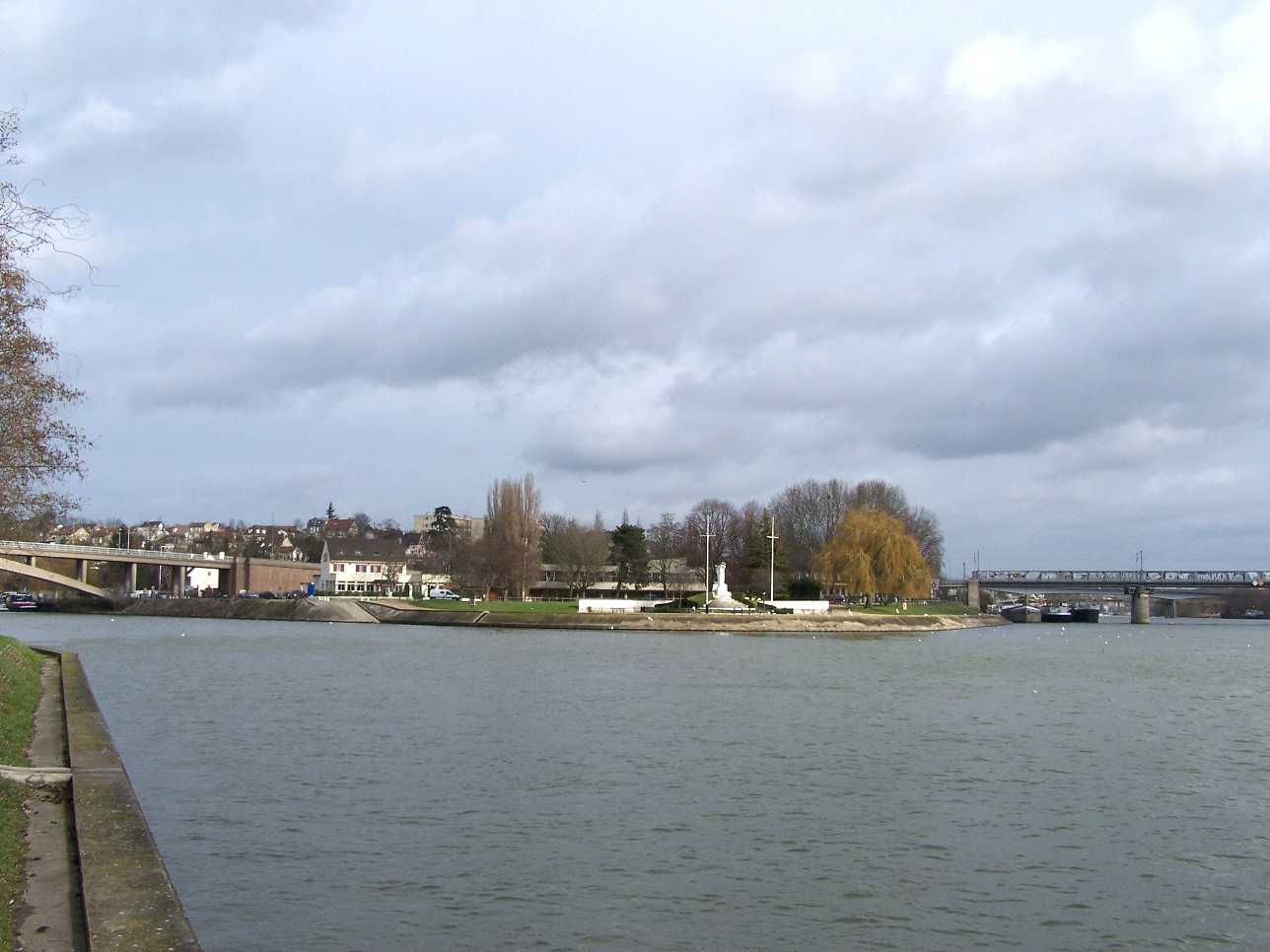
Confluence of Oise (left) and Seine (right) rivers

Conflans-Sainte-Honorine (French pronunciation: [kɔ̃flɑ̃ sɛ̃t ɔnɔʁin]) is a commune in the Yvelines department in the Île-de-France region in north-central France. It is located in the northwestern suburbs of Paris, 24.2 km (15.0 mi) from the center of Paris.

The commune was originally named for its geographic position at the confluence of the Seine and Oise rivers. The village was given the addition "Sainte Honorine" in the 13th century after Saint Honorina, whose relics had been kept there since AD 876.

Partly on account of its strategic position, Conflans-Sainte-Honorine is considered the capital of the French inland waterways, and the right bank of the river Seine is still lined with barges (although these are now used mainly as houseboats). Every year in June, the town celebrates the Pardon national de la batellerie in remembrance of its former importance to inland shipping.

== History ==
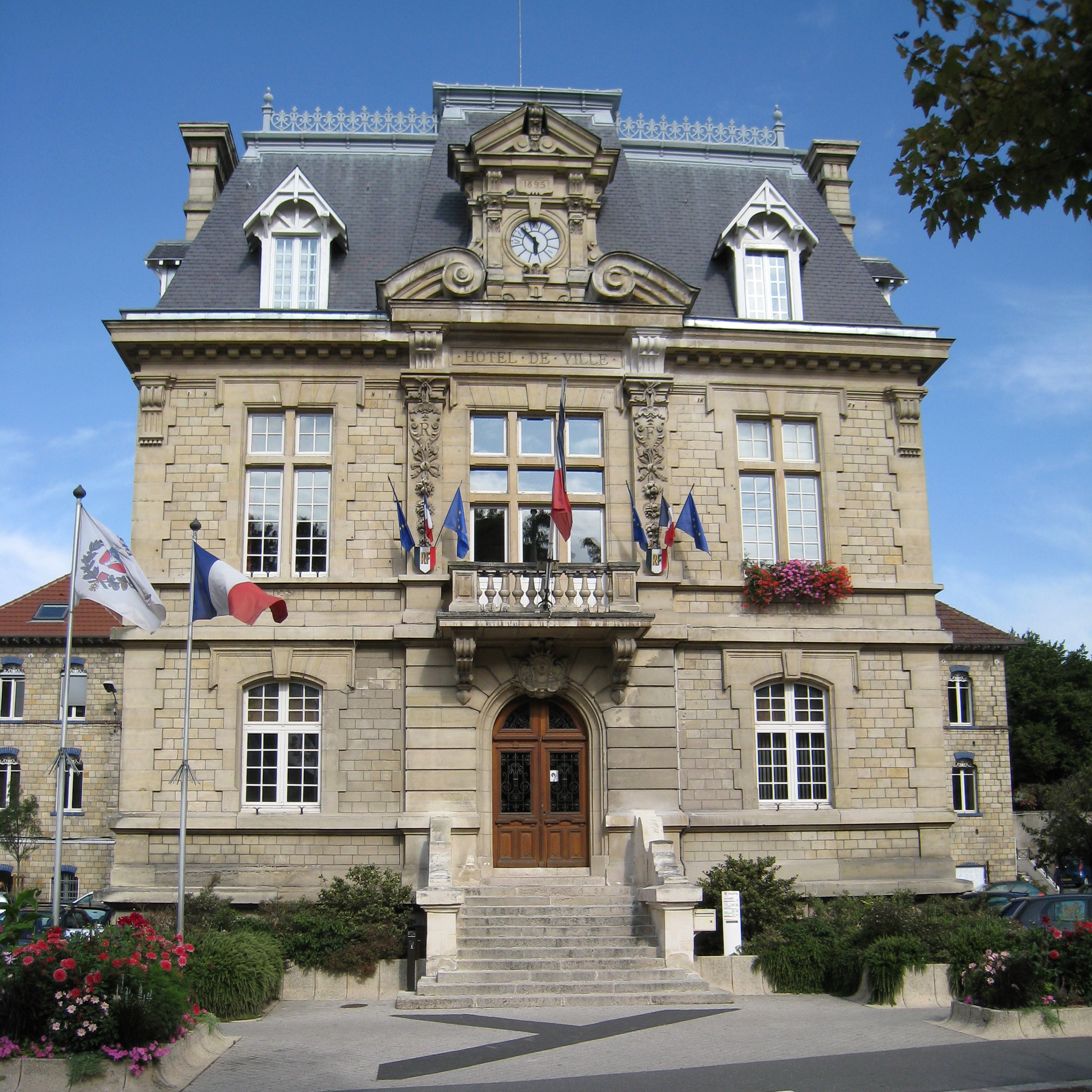
The Hôtel de Ville

The Hôtel de Ville was completed in 1895.

== Population ==
Historical population

Year	Pop.	±% p.a.
1793	2,181	—
1800	1,992	−1.29%
1806	1,841	−1.31%
1821	1,681	−0.60%
1831	1,634	−0.28%
1836	1,524	−1.38%
1841	1,423	−1.36%
1846	1,484	+0.84%
1851	1,442	−0.57%
1856	1,544	+1.38%
1861	1,659	+1.45%
1866	1,787	+1.50%
1872	1,822	+0.32%
1876	1,985	+2.17%
1881	1,789	−2.06%
1886	2,067	+2.93%
1891	2,482	+3.73%
1896	2,701	+1.71%
1901	3,212	+3.53%

Year	Pop.	±% p.a.
1906	3,559	+2.07%
1911	3,822	+1.44%
1921	4,466	+1.57%
1926	6,212	+6.82%
1931	7,514	+3.88%
1936	10,283	+6.48%
1946	10,775	+0.47%
1954	13,809	+3.15%
1962	21,874	+5.92%
1968	26,304	+3.12%
1975	31,066	+2.41%
1982	28,977	−0.99%
1990	31,467	+1.04%
1999	33,327	+0.64%
2007	33,888	+0.21%
2012	35,135	+0.73%
2017	35,846	+0.40%
2023	36,958	+0.51%

Source: EHESS and INSEE (1968-2023)

== Transport ==
Conflans-Sainte-Honorine is served by Conflans-Sainte-Honorine station on the Transilien Paris-Saint-Lazare regional rail line.

It is also served by Conflans-Fin-d'Oise station which is an interchange station on Paris RER line A and on the Transilien Paris-Saint-Lazare suburban rail line.

== Education ==
As of 2016 the city's schools had 4,258 students. There are nine public preschools, seven public elementary schools, one private school, and an école régionale du premier degré (ERPD).

Elementary schools:

- École élémentaire Chennevières
- École élémentaire Clos-d’en-Haut
- École élémentaire Côtes-Reverses
- École élémentaire Gaston-Rousset
- École élémentaire Grandes-Terres
- École élémentaire Henri-Dunant
- École élémentaire Paul-Bert

The médiathèque Blaise-Cendrars has digital documents and multimedia services.

Samuel Paty, a middle school teacher at Collège du Bois d'Aulne in Conflans-Sainte-Honorine, was killed and beheaded in 2020 in an Islamist terrorist attack.

== Parks and recreation ==
Centre aquatique de Conflans has the town's pool.

== Personalities ==
- Charb (1967–2015), satirical caricaturist and journalist, was born in Conflans
- Samuel Coco-Viloin (born 1987), track and field athlete
- Gérard Genette (1930–2018), literary critic and theorist of literature, spent part of his childhood there
- Jean-Paul Huchon, president of the regional council for Île-de-France, Socialist party, former mayor of Conflans (1994–2001)
- Michel Rocard (1930–2016), French prime minister (1988–1991), Socialist party, mayor of Conflans (1977–1994)
- Nicolas Roche (born 1984), Irish professional cyclist, was born here

== Twin towns – sister cities ==
Conflans-Sainte-Honorine is twinned with:

- Großauheim (Hanau), Germany
- Chimay, Belgium
- Ramsgate, England, United Kingdom

== See also ==
- Communes of the Yvelines department
- 2020 Islamist attack
