= Cantons of Le Havre =

Coordinates: 49.4944°N 0.1079°E

The Cantons of Le Havre are cantons situated in the Seine-Maritime département and in the Normandy region of northern France. Since the French canton reorganisation which came into effect in March 2015, the commune of Le Havre is subdivided into 6 cantons, some of which also contain other communes:

- Canton of Le Havre-1 (pop. 37,768)
- Canton of Le Havre-2 (pop. 35,420, also includes Harfleur and Montivilliers)
- Canton of Le Havre-3 (pop. 37,580, also includes Gainneville, Gonfreville-l'Orcher and Rogerville)
- Canton of Le Havre-4 (pop. 37,107)
- Canton of Le Havre-5 (pop. 32,874)
- Canton of Le Havre-6 (pop. 37,335, also includes Sainte-Adresse)

== See also ==
- Arrondissements of the Seine-Maritime department
- Cantons of the Seine-Maritime department
- Communes of Seine-Maritime
