= Canton of Gonfreville-l'Orcher =

Coordinates: 49°30′35″N 0°13′56″E

Gonfreville-l'Orcher
- Former canton
- Interactive map of Gonfreville-l'Orcher
- Country: France
- Region: Normandy
- Department: Seine-Maritime
- No. of communes: {{{nbcomm}}}
- Disbanded: 2015
- Area: 34.67 km^{2} (13.39 sq mi)
- Population (2012): 20,031
  - Density: 577.8/km^{2} (1,496/sq mi)

The Canton of Gonfreville-l'Orcher is a former canton situated in the Seine-Maritime département and in the Haute-Normandie region of northern France. It was disbanded following the French canton reorganisation which came into effect in March 2015. It had a total of 20,031 inhabitants (2012).

== Geography ==
An area of light industry, oil refineries and some farming, in the arrondissement of Le Havre, centred on the town of Gonfreville-l'Orcher. The altitude varies from 0m (Gonfreville-l'Orcher) to 107m (Gainneville) for an average altitude of 79m.

The canton comprised 3 communes:

- Gainneville
- Gonfreville-l'Orcher
- Harfleur

== Population ==
Historical population Canton of Gonfreville-l'Orcher
| Year | 1962 | 1968 | 1975 | 1982 | 1990 | 1999 |
| Pop. | 18,282 | 19,578 | 21,429 | 21,637 | 21,601 | 20,825 |
| ±% | — | +7.1% | +9.5% | +1.0% | −0.2% | −3.6% |
From the year 1962 on: No double counting – residents of multiple communes (e.g. students and military personnel) are counted only once. Source: INSEE

== See also ==
- Arrondissements of the Seine-Maritime department
- Cantons of the Seine-Maritime department
- Communes of the Seine-Maritime department
