= Seine-Maritime's 3rd constituency =

Constituency of the National Assembly of France

3rd constituency of Seine-Maritime
- inline Constituency of the National Assembly of France

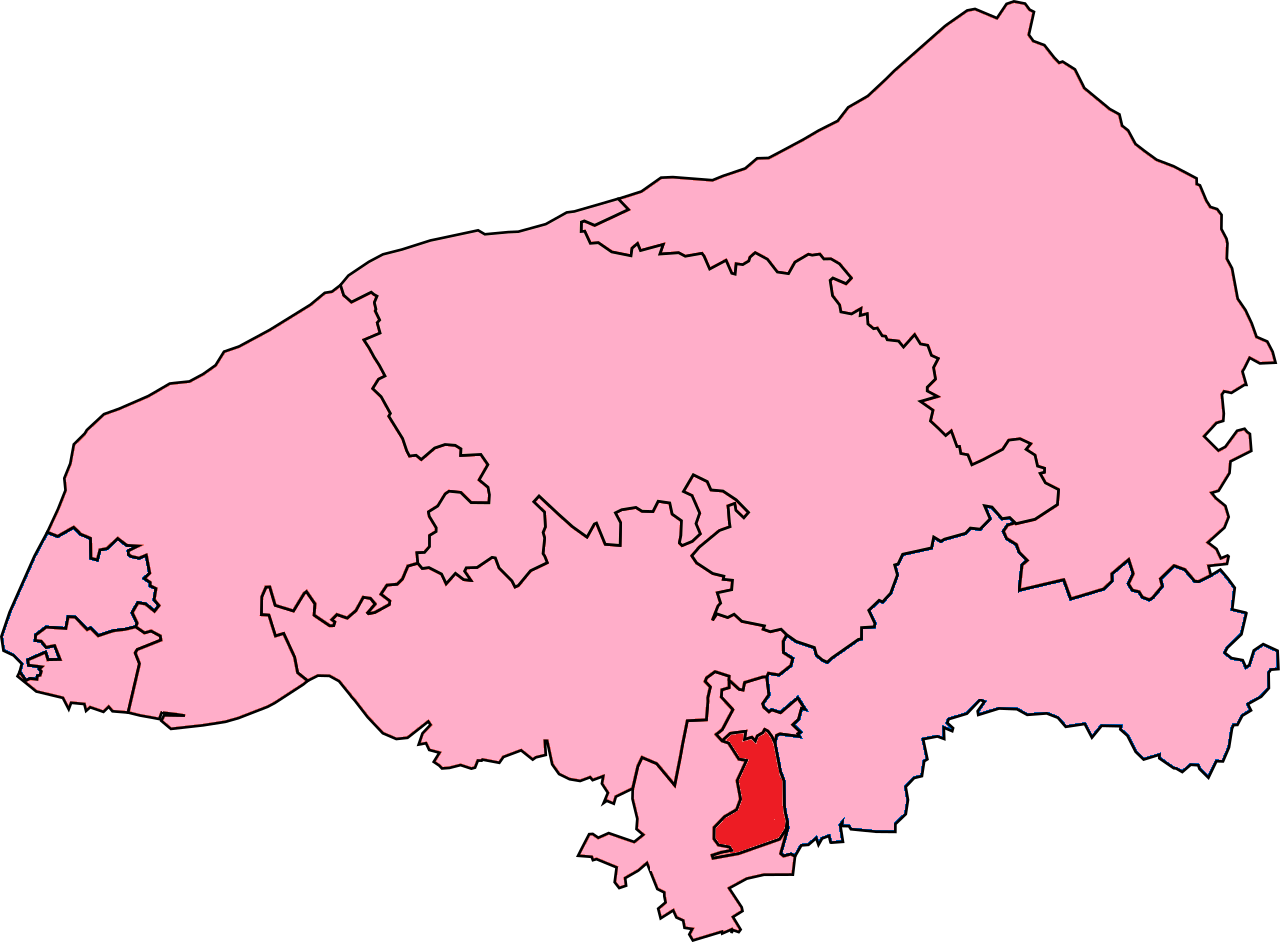
- Seine-Maritime's 3rd Constituency shown within Seine-Maritime
- Deputy: Édouard Bénard; PCF
- Department: Seine-Maritime
- Cantons: Le Petit-Quevilly, Rouen VI, Saint-Etienne-du-Rouvray, Sotteville-lès-Rouen Est, Sotteville-lès-Rouen Ouest
- Registered voters: 69,397

The 3rd constituency of the Seine-Maritime (French: Troisième circonscription de la Seine-Maritime) is a French legislative constituency in the Seine-Maritime département. Like the other 576 French constituencies, it elects one MP using the two-round system, with a run-off if no candidate receives over 50% of the vote in the first round.

== Description ==
The 3rd Constituency of the Seine-Maritime covers the south of Rouen proper plus the city's southern suburbs. The large former railway town of Sotteville-lès-Rouen on the south bank of the Seine makes up a significant part of this seat. The 2012 review of boundaries has added Rouen's VI (sixth) canton to the seat.

Reflecting its industrial heritage the seat has oscillated between the Socialist Party (PS) (which did not field a candidate in 2024) and the Communist Party.

== Assembly Members ==
Election	Member	Party
1958	Jean-Marie Morisse	UNR
1962	Jean-Marie Morisse	UNR
1967	Roland Leroy	PCF
1968	Roland Leroy	PCF
1973	Roland Leroy	PCF
1978	Roland Leroy	PCF
1981	Pierre Bourguignon	PS
1986	Proportional representation – no election by constituency	
1988	Pierre Bourguignon	PS
1993	Michel Grandpierre	PCF
1997	Pierre Bourguignon	PS
2002	Pierre Bourguignon	PS
2007	Pierre Bourguignon	PS
2012	Luce Pane	PS
2017	Hubert Wulfranc	PCF
2022	Hubert Wulfranc	PCF
2024	Édouard Bénard	PCF

== Election results ==
=== 2024 ===
Legislative Election 2024: Seine-Maritime's 3rd constituency
Party	Candidate	Votes	%	±%
LO	Pascal Le Manach	705	1.63	+0.73
HOR (Ensemble)	Letycia Ossibi	5,951	13.78	N/A
RN	Pauline Daniel	12,194	28.24	+11.10
REC	Anthony Vanhese	566	1.31	−1.43
PCF (NFP)	Edouard Benard	21,000	48.64	+4.43
LR	Alexis Coppein	2,757	6.39	N/A
Turnout		43,173	97.56	−0.56
Registered electors		70,623		
2nd round result
PCF	Édouard Bénard	27,329	66.88	−3.48
RN	Pauline Daniel	13,533	33.12	+3.48
Turnout		40,862	93.52	+2.50
Registered electors		70,633		
PCF hold		Swing		

=== 2022 ===
Candidate	Party	Alliance	First round			Second round		
Candidate	Party	Alliance	Votes	%	+/–	Votes	%	+/–
Hubert Wulfranc	PCF	NUPÉS	13,544	44.21	+2.83	18,868	70.36	+2.83
Salomée Tessier	RN		5,251	17.14	+1.81	7,947	29.64	N/A
Letycia Ossibi	LREM	Ensemble	5,026	16.41	-10.35			
Kader Chekhemani	PS diss.		3,374	11.01	N/A			
Patrick Chabert	LC	UDC	1,115	3.64	-1.87			
Clémence Bourdet	REC		840	2.74	N/A			
Delphine Gerday	PA		627	2.05	N/A			
Tony Vasseur	LP	UPF	301	0.98	-0.26			
Pascal Le Manach	LO		276	0.90	-0.69			
Ouarda El Atrassi	UDMF		216	0.71	N/A			
Nicolas Huet de Barros	DIV		63	0.21	N/A			
Valid votes			30,633	98.14	+0.50	26,815	91.02	-1.49
Blank votes			376	1.20	-0.59	2,109	7.16	+1.91
Null votes			206	0.66	+0.09	535	1.82	-0.42
Turnout			31,215	44.52	-2.66	29,459	42.01	+0.51
Abstentions			38,900	55.48	+2.66	40,669	57.99	-0.51
Registered voters			70,115			70,128		
Source: Ministry of the Interior, Le Monde
Result						PCF HOLD		

=== 2017 ===
Candidate	Party	Alliance	First round			Second round		
Candidate	Party	Alliance	Votes	%	+/–	Votes	%	+/–
Cyrille Grenot	REM		8,681	27.16	N/A	10,371	38.93	N/A
Hubert Wulfranc	PCF		8,656	27.08	+2.48	16,268	61.07	N/A
Guillaume Pennelle	FN		4,901	15.33	-2.35			
Luce Pane	PS		4,573	14.30	-26.18			
Jonas Haddad	LR	UDC	1,760	5.51	-2.13			
Abdelkrim Marchani	DVG		1,225	3.83	N/A			
Jemâa Saad	DVE		695	2.17	N/A			
Pascal Le Manach	LO		507	1.59	+0.80			
Nadine Jaze	DLF		397	1.24	N/A			
Laurent Montaron	UPR		254	0.79	N/A			
Evelyne Delbos	MoDem		207	0.65	N/A			
Rémi Candelier	POID		112	0.35	N/A			
Nicolas Huet de Barros	DVG		0	0.00	N/A			
Valid votes			31,968	97.64	+0.20	26,639	92.51	+14.28
Blank votes			586	1.79	N/A	1,513	5.25	N/A
Null votes			187	0.57	N/A	645	2.24	N/A
Turnout			32,741	47.18	-7.25	28,797	41.50	+4.93
Abstentions			36,656	52.82	+7.25	40,600	58.50	-4.93
Registered voters			69,397			69,397		
Source: Ministry of the Interior
Result						PCF GAIN FROM PS		

=== 2012 ===
Candidate	Party	Alliance	First round			Second round		
Candidate	Party	Alliance	Votes	%	+/–	Votes	%	+/–
Luce Pane	PS		14,870	40.48	+6.04	19,813	100.0	+33.06
Hubert Wulfranc*	PCF	FG	9,036	24.60	+4.05			
Jacques Gaillard	FN	RBM	6,495	17.68	+13.19			
Brigitte Briere	DVD		1,470	4.00	N/A			
Brahim Charafi	NC		1,418	3.86	+3.08			
Christophe Chomant	NC		1,388	3.78	+3.00			
Jean-Pierre Lancry	EELV		1,219	3.32	-0.15			
Christine Poupin	EXG		434	1.18	N/A			
Pascal Le Manach	EXG		291	0.79	N/A			
Vincent Crepel	DIV		110	0.30	N/A			
Valid votes			36,731	97.44	-0.57	19,813	78.23	-18.04
Blank and null votes			966	2.56	+0.57	5,514	21.77	+18.04
Turnout			37,697	54.43	-5.27	25,327	36.57	-19.76
Abstentions			31,564	45.57	+5.27	43,933	63.43	+19.76
Registered voters			69,261			69,260		
Source: Ministry of the Interior
Result						PS HOLD		

* Withdrew before the 2nd round

=== 2007 ===
Candidate	Party	Alliance	First round			Second round		
Candidate	Party	Alliance	Votes	%	+/–	Votes	%	+/–
Pierre Bourguignon	PS		11,474	34.44	+0.04	20,669	66.94	+2.68
Catherine Tafforeau	UMP	MP	7,994	24.00	+3.32	10,207	33.06	-2.68
Hubert Wulfranc	PCF		6,845	20.55	+2.63			
Thomas Marcy	MoDem		1,528	4.59	N/A			
Martine Cavelier	FN		1,496	4.49	-8.09			
Jean-Pierre Girod	LV		1,155	3.47	+0.16			
Christine Poupin	EXG		1,075	3.23	N/A			
Hafidh Bensifi	EXG		421	1.26	N/A			
Daniel Dieudonne	EXG		363	1.09	N/A			
Karin Leroux	NC	MP	259	0.78	N/A			
Josette Delaistre	EXD		250	0.75	N/A			
Alain Fleau	DIV		171	0.51	N/A			
Eric Bellet	DIV		118	0.35	N/A			
Gabriel Calippe	EXG		163	0.49	N/A			
Valid votes			33,312	98.01	+0.26	30,876	96.27	+1.88
Blank and null votes			677	1.99	-0.26	1,195	3.73	-1.88
Turnout			33,989	59.70	-2.66	32,071	56.33	+0.83
Abstentions			22,945	40.30	+2.66	24,863	43.67	-0.83
Registered voters			56,934			56,934		
Source: Ministry of the Interior
Result						PS HOLD		

=== 2002 ===
Candidate	Party	Alliance	First round			Second round		
Candidate	Party	Alliance	Votes	%	+/–	Votes	%	+/–
Pierre Bourguignon	PS		11,388	34.40	+4.55	18,280	64.26	-35.74
Catherine Tafforeau	UMP	UPMP	6,846	20.68	N/A	10,169	35.74	N/A
Michel Grandpierre	PCF		5,931	17.92	-8.67			
Danielle Deconihout	FN		4,165	12.58	-4.06			
Jean-Pierre Girod	LV		1,202	3.63	+0.91			
Michèle Ernis	LCR		842	2.54	+1.50			
Daniel Dieudonné	LO		590	1.78	-0.40			
Marianne Journiac	PR		475	1.43	N/A			
Louis Pennacchi	DVE		416	1.26	N/A			
Bernard Mazier	MNR		385	1.16	N/A			
Brigitte Brière	RPR diss.		247	0.75	N/A			
Stéphanie Lambert	EXG		233	0.70	N/A			
Magali Dumenil	CPNT		146	0.44	N/A			
Catherine Bruegghe	GE		144	0.43	-2.47			
Luce Eudier-Niel	PT		96	0.29	-0.45			
Valid votes			33,106	97.75	+1.74	28,449	94.39	+24.35
Invalid votes			763	2.25	-1.74	1,691	5.61	-24.35
Turnout			33,869	62.36	-5.99	30,140	55.50	+2.84
Abstentions			20,440	37.64	+5.99	24,169	44.50	-2.84
Registered voters			54,309			54,309		
Source: National Assembly
Result						PS HOLD		

=== 1997 ===
Candidate	Party	Alliance	First round			Second round		
Candidate	Party	Alliance	Votes	%	+/–	Votes	%	+/–
Pierre Bourguignon	PS	GP	10,782	29.85	+7.13	20,299	100.0	N/A
Michel Grandpierre*	PCF	GP	9,605	26.59	+3.77			
Gilles Pennelle	FN		6,011	16.64	+2.55			
Serge Cramoisan	FD	UDF	5,123	14.18	-8.71			
Nathalie Leblanc	GE		1,049	2.90	N/A			
Alain Caillot	LV	GP	984	2.72	-5.64			
Daniel Dieudonne	LO		787	2.18	+0.20			
Patrice Gonel	LDI		380	1.05	N/A			
Michèle Ernis	LCR		374	1.04	N/A			
Jean-Luc Gaillard	MEI		335	0.93	N/A			
Gabriel Calippe	PT		267	0.74	-0.44			
Jean-Marie Wegner	EXG		184	0.51	N/A			
Marc Stella	DVG		138	0.38	N/A			
Eric Bellet	DIV		98	0.27	N/A			
Valid votes			36,177	96.01	+0.98	20,299	70.04	-22.46
Invalid votes			1,479	3.99	-1.08	8,682	29.96	+22.46
Turnout			37,616	68.35	+0.16	28,981	52.66	-15.45
Abstentions			17,418	31.65	-0.16	26,053	47.34	+15.45
Registered voters			55,034			55,034		
Source: National Assembly
Result						PS GAIN FROM PCF		

* Withdrew before the 2nd round

=== 1993 ===
Candidate	Party	Alliance	First round			Second round		
Candidate	Party	Alliance	Votes	%	+/–	Votes	%	+/–
Serge Cramoisan	UDF	UPF	8,402	22.89	+2.74	14,864	41.64	N/A
Michel Grandpierre	PCF		8,379	22.82	-5.12	20,830	58.36	N/A
Pierre Bourguignon*	PS	ADFP	8,342	22.72	-20.96			
Gilles Pennelle	FN		5,173	14.09	+5.91			
Jean-Pierre Girod	LV		3,070	8.36	N/A			
Daniel Moison	DVD		952	2.59	N/A			
Jullian Liliane	NERNA		874	2.38	N/A			
Jean-Pierre Paris	LO		728	1.98	N/A			
Gabriel Calippe	PT		434	1.18	N/A			
Michele Ernis	EXG		360	0.98	N/A			
Valid votes			36,714	95.03		35,694	92.50	
Invalid votes			1,922	4.97		2,894	7.50	
Turnout			38,636	68.19		38,588	68.11	
Abstentions			18,020	32.81		18,068	32.89	
Registered voters			56,656			56,656		
Source: Ministry of the Interior
Result						PCF GAIN FROM PS		

* Withdrew before the 2nd round
