= Timeline of Rouen =

Timeline of the history of the French city Rouen

Coordinates: 49.4412°N 1.0963°E

The following is a timeline of the history of the city of Rouen, France.

== Prior to 18th century ==
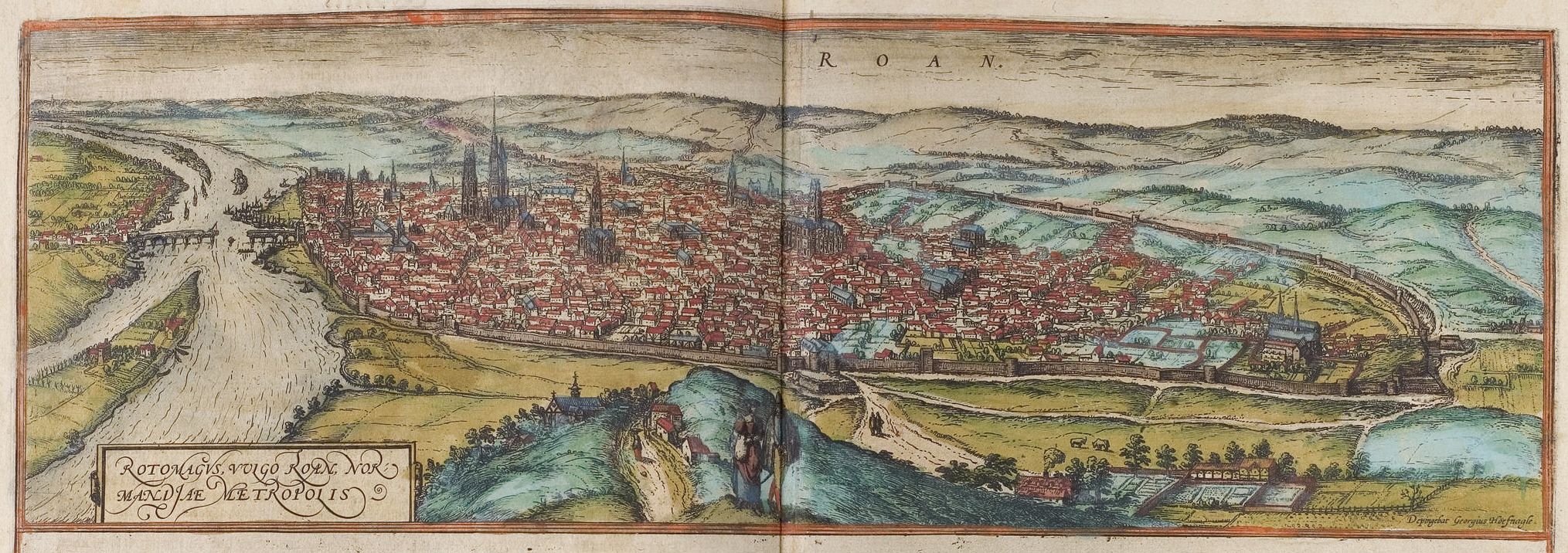
Overview of Rouen, 1572

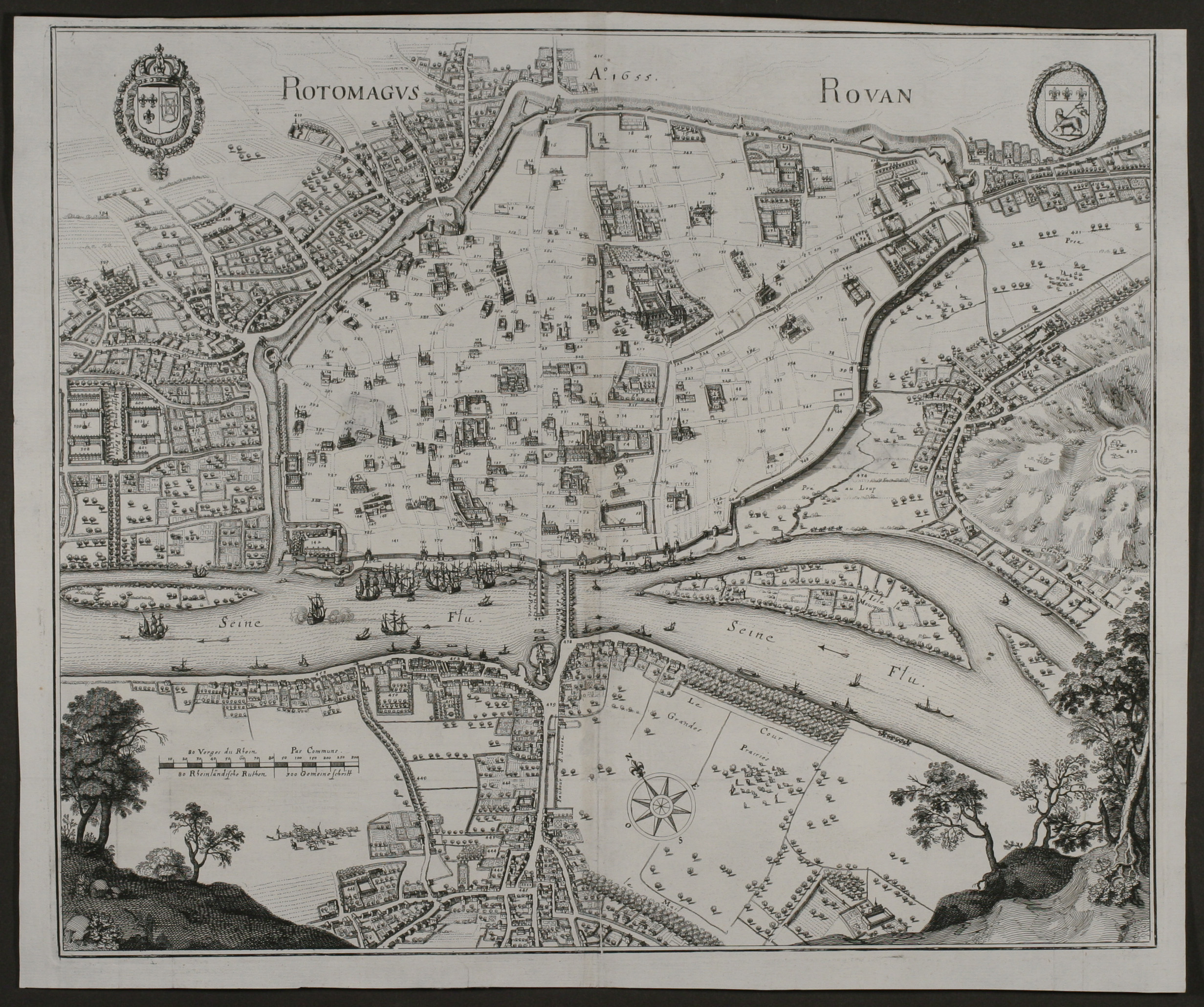
Map of Rouen, 1657

- 5th century - Roman Catholic Archdiocese of Rouen created.
- 586 - Prætextatus (bishop of Rouen) assassinated.
- 841 - Town besieged by Vikings.
- 911 - Rollo takes power.
- 912 - Rouen becomes capital of Duchy of Normandy.
- 1087 - Death of William the Conqueror at Priory of St Gervase.
- 1090 - Rouen Riot
- 1150 - Founding charter.
- 1200 - Cathedral burns down.
- 1202 - Rouen Cathedral construction begins.
- 1204 - Philip II of France in power.
- 1210 - Rouen Castle built.
- 1306 - Jews expelled.
- 1318 - Church of St. Ouen construction begins.
- 1382 - Harelle revolt.
- 1389 - Tour de la Grosse Horloge built.
- 1418 - Siege of Rouen.
- 1419 - Henry V of England takes power.
- 1431 - Joan of Arc executed.
- 1432 - Church of Saint-Maclou construction begins (approximate date).
- 1449 - Charles VII of France takes power.
- 1486 - Puy (society) Confrérie de la Conception de Notre Dame formed.
- 1487 - Printing press in operation.
- 1499
  - Parlement de Normandie begins meeting in Rouen.
  - Exchequer of Normandy installed.
- 1508 - Palais de Justice built.
- 1550 - Entry into Rouen of Henri II and Catherine de' Medici.
- 1562 - Siege of Rouen.
- 1583 - Codified Norman law published.
- 1591 - Siege of Rouen.
- 1593 - Collège de Bourbon established.
- 1606 - 6 June: Birth of Pierre Corneille.
- 1642 - Pascal's calculator invented.
- 1673 - Rouen manufactory of porcelain in operation.

== 18th-19th centuries ==
- 1703 - Chamber of Commerce created.
- 1734 - School of surgery founded.
- 1744 - Académie des sciences, belles-lettres et arts de Rouen founded.
- 1749 - Porte Guillaume-Lion built.
- 1758 - Hospital opens.
- 1785 - Le Journal de Normandie newspaper begins publication.
- 1790 - Rouen becomes part of the Seine Inférieure souveraineté.
- 1793 - Population: 84,323.
- 1801
  - Cantons of Rouen 1, 2, 3, 4, 5, and 6 created.
  - Musée des Beaux-Arts founded.
- 1809 - Rouen Public Library opens.
- 1821 - 12 December: Birth of Gustave Flaubert.
- 1825 - Hôtel de Ville completed.
- 1828 - Muséum d'Histoire Naturelle de Rouen founded.
- 1834 - Musée départemental des antiquités (Rouen) opens.
- 1836 - Population: 92,083.
- 1840 - Jardin des Plantes opens.
- 1843 - Railway to Paris begins operating.
- 1847 - Rouen-Rive-Droite station opens.
- 1851 - Population: 100,265.
- 1856 - Flaubert's fiction novel Madame Bovary published (set in Rouen).
- 1864 - Rouen Ceramic Museum established.
- 1867 - Rouen-Martainville station opens.
- 1869 - Société de l'histoire de Normandie founded.
- 1870 - Prussian occupation.
- 1871 - Rouen Business School established.
- 1874 - Église Saint-Gervais de Rouen rebuilt.
- 1876 - Population: 104,902.
- 1877 - Trams begin operating.
- 1879 - Société de géographie de Rouen founded.
- 1880 - Musee-Bibliothèque built.
- 1883 - Rouen Orléans station (rail station) opens.
- 1888 - Pont Boieldieu (bridge) constructed.
- 1891 - Photo-club rouennais formed.
- 1892 - Artist Monet begins painting cathedral series.
- 1899 - FC Rouen sport club formed.

== 20th century ==
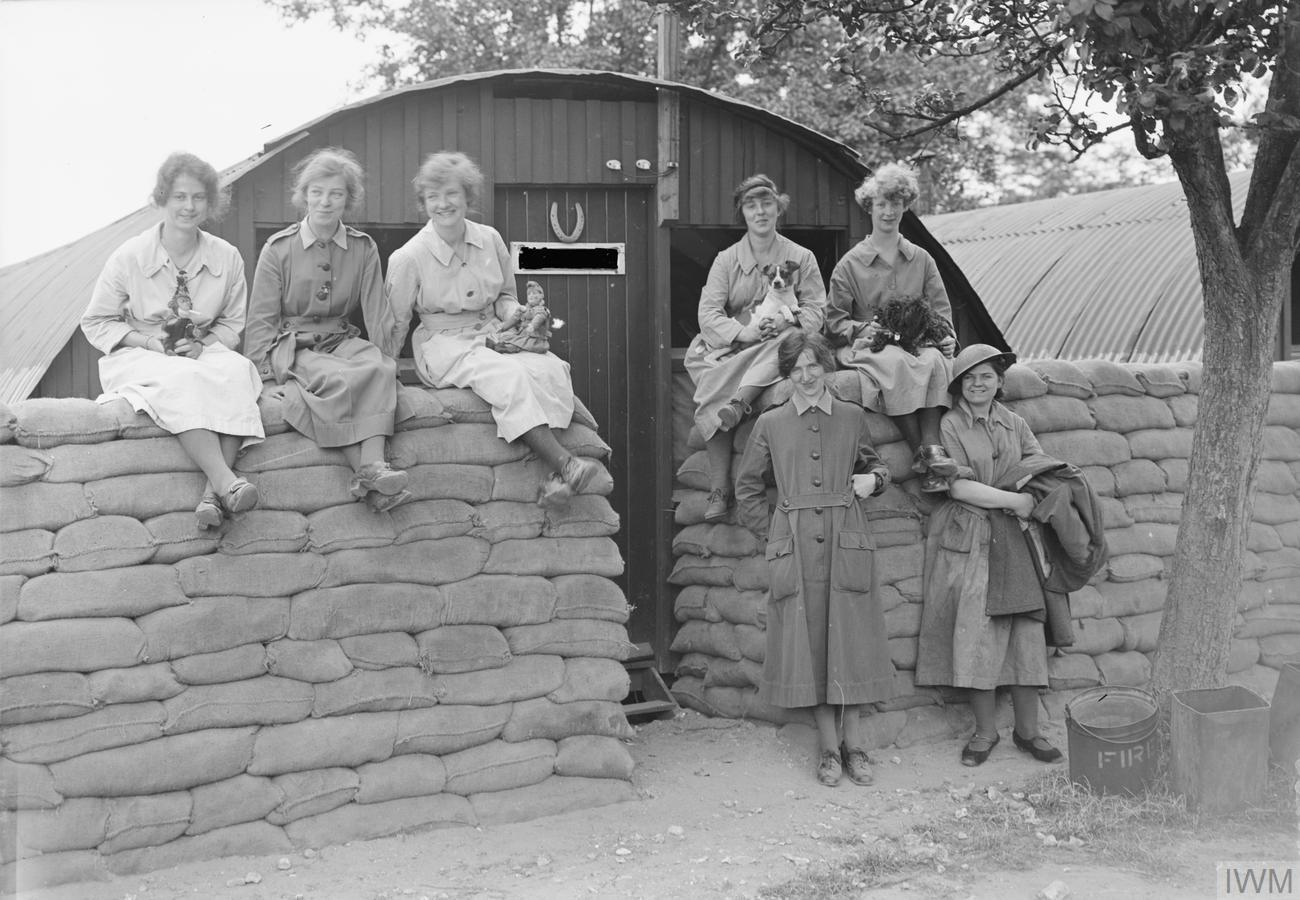
Members of Queen Mary's Army Auxiliary Corps outside their Nissen hut billets in Rouen, on 18 June 1918

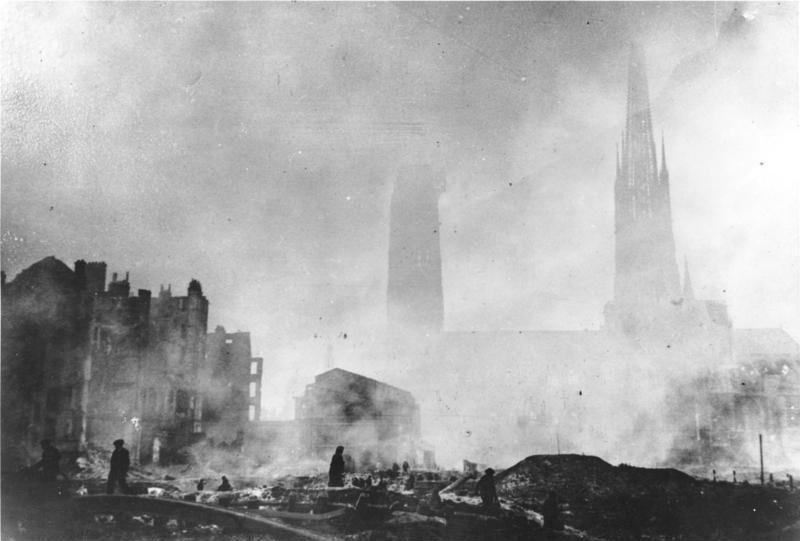
Rouen Cathedral, June 1944

- 1906 - Population: 118,459.
- 1911
  - Norman Museum opens.
  - Population: 124,987.
- 1917 - Stadium opens.
- 1926 - Rubis Terminal chemical storage site established in Le Grand-Quevilly.
- 1940 - June 9: German occupation begins.
- 1942 - Subcamp of the Stalag 356 prisoner-of-war camp established by the Germans.
- 1944
  - April: Subcamp of the V SS construction brigade established. The prisoners were mostly Poles and Soviets.
  - 30 May-5 June: City bombed during the Semaine rouge (Rouen).
  - August: Subcamp of the V SS construction brigade dissolved. Surviving prisoners deported to the Mittelbau-Dora concentration camp.
  - August 15: German occupation ends.
- 1950 - Rouen-Les-Essarts racetrack opens.
- 1953 - Musée Jeanne-d'Arc established.
- 1955 - Pont Boieldieu rebuilt.
- 1959 - Rouen twinned with Norwich, United Kingdom.
- 1965 - Archives department of Seine-Maritime building constructed.
- 1966
  - University of Rouen founded.
  - Rouen twinned with Hanover, West Germany.
- 1979 - Church of St Joan of Arc built.
- 1982 - Dragons de Rouen ice hockey team formed.
- 1984
  - City becomes regional capital of Upper Normandy.
  - Restaurant Gill in business.
- 1985 - Institut National des Sciences Appliquées de Rouen established.
- 1988 - Rouen Nordic Film Festival begins.
- 1991 - Rouen Airport opens.
- 1992 - Île Lacroix ice rink opens.
- 1994 - Métro begins operating.
- 1995 - Yvon Robert (politician) becomes mayor.
- 1999
  - Maritime, Fluvial and Harbour Museum opens.
  - Population: 106,592.

== 21st century ==
- 2001
  - Transport Est-Ouest Rouennais buses begin operating.
  - Zénith de Rouen (concert hall) opens.
- 2002 - Rouen twinned with Salerno, Italy.
- 2007 - Population: 110,276.
- 2008
  - Pont Gustave-Flaubert (bridge) opens.
  - Rouen twinned with Cleveland, USA.
- 2010 - City becomes part of the Agglomeration community of Rouen-Elbeuf-Austreberthe.
- 2014 - March: Rouen municipal election, 2014 held.
- 2015 - December: Normandy regional election, 2015 held.
- 2016
  - Rouen becomes part of Normandy (administrative region).
  - Thirteen people are killed in a fire in Rouen.

== See also ==
- History of Rouen
- List of mayors of Rouen
- List of heritage sites in Rouen
- History of Normandy region

other cities in the Normandy region

- Timeline of Caen
- Timeline of Le Havre

== Bibliography ==
=== in English ===
- Theodore Alois Buckley (1862), "Rouen", Great Cities of the Middle Ages (2nd ed.), London: Routledge, Warne, & Routledge
- William Henry Overall, ed. (1870). "Rouen". Dictionary of Chronology. London: William Tegg. hdl:2027/uc2.ark:/13960/t9m32q949.
- "Rouen" . Encyclopædia Britannica. Vol. 23 (11th ed.). 1910. pp. 768–770.
- Benjamin Vincent (1910), "Rouen", Haydn's Dictionary of Dates (25th ed.), London: Ward, Lock & Co., hdl:2027/loc.ark:/13960/t89g6g776
- "Rouen", Paris and Environs (18th ed.), Leipzig: Karl Baedeker, 1913, OCLC 255000 (+ 1889 Northern France ed.
- Jean Caswell; Ivan Sipkov (1977). "Normandy". Coutumes of France in the Library of Congress: an Annotated Bibliography. USA: Library of Congress. hdl:2027/mdp.39015034753866. ISBN 9780844402321.
- Trudy Ring, ed. (1995). "Rouen". Northern Europe. International Dictionary of Historic Places. Fitzroy Dearborn. ISBN 978-1-136-63944-9.

=== in French ===
- Jean-Baptiste-Joseph Champagnac [in French] (1839). "Rouen". Manuel des dates, en forme de dictionnaire. Perisse frères.
- Édouard Frère (1860). "Journaux: Seine-Inf.". Manuel du bibliographie normand (in French). Vol. 2. Rouen. p. 116. hdl:2027/hvd.32044093616647.
- Arthur Giry (1883). Les Établissements de Rouen: études sur l'histoire des institutions municipales. Bibliothèque de l'Ecole des hautes études... Sciences philologiques et historiques; 55., 59. Fasc. (in French). Paris: F. Vieweg.
- Rouen. Guides Joanne (in French). [Lib.] Hachette [et cie.,]. 1901.
- "Rouen". Ville de Rouen, bibliothèque publique: cadre de classement du fonds de Normandie (in French). A. Lestringant. 1901. (subject categories)
