= Canton of Mont-Saint-Aignan =

Coordinates: 49°27′54″N 1°04′12″E

Mont-Saint-Aignan
- Canton
- Country: France
- Region: Normandy
- Department: Seine-Maritime
- No. of communes: {{{nbcomm}}}
- Area: 11.10 km^{2} (4.29 sq mi)
- Population (2023): 30,967
  - Density: 2,790/km^{2} (7,226/sq mi)
- INSEE code: 76 22

The Canton of Mont-Saint-Aignan is a canton situated in the Seine-Maritime département and in the Normandy region of northern France.

== Geography ==
An area of light industry, forestry and manufacturing situated immediately northwest of Rouen in the arrondissement of Rouen. The altitude varies from 4m (Déville-lès-Rouen) to 171m (Mont-Saint-Aignan) with an average altitude of 108m.

The Canton of Mont-Saint-Aignan comprises the following 2 communes:

- Déville-lès-Rouen
- Mont-Saint-Aignan

== Population ==
Historical population
Year	Pop.	±% p.a.
2013	29,487	—
2018	29,723	+0.16%
Source: INSEE

== See also ==
- Arrondissements of the Seine-Maritime department
- Cantons of the Seine-Maritime department
- Communes of the Seine-Maritime department
