= Le Prolétaire normand =

- Communist Party poster, calling on workers and trade unions to support Le Prolétaire normand
- Type: Weekly
- Political alignment: Communist
- Language: French language
- Headquarters: Sotteville-les-Rouen

Le Prolétaire normand ('The Norman Proletarian') was a communist weekly newspaper published from Sotteville-les-Rouen, France. The newspaper was published between 1933 and 1937. It had a local edition based in Le Havre.

On average, around 5,000 copies of Le Prolétaire normand were printed weekly. Most of them, 4,300-4,580, were sold by Communist Party cadres.
