= Pierre Bourguignon =

French politician (1942–2019)

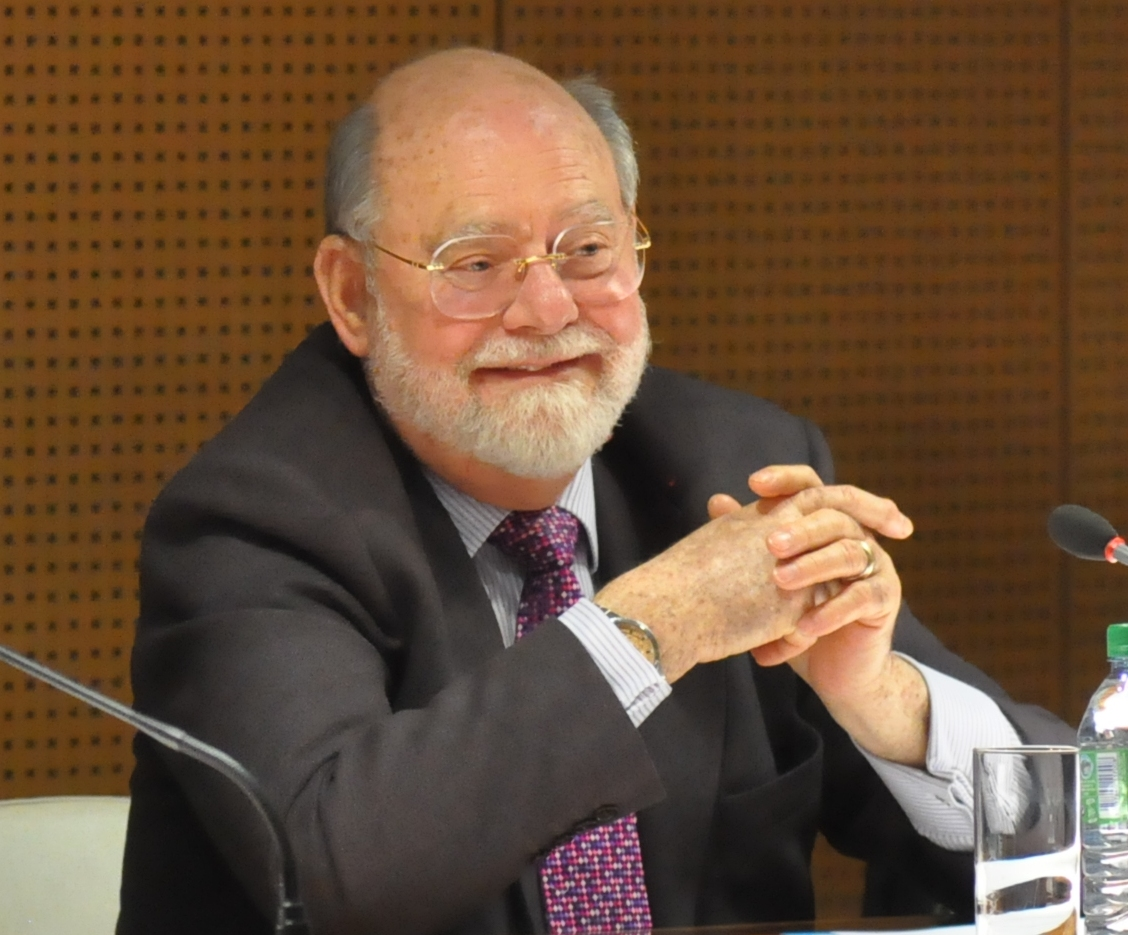
- Pierre Bourguignon in 2013

Member of the National Assembly for Seine-Maritime's 3rd constituency
- In office 12 June 1997 – 17 June 2012
- Preceded by: Michel Grandpierre
- Succeeded by: Luce Pane

Mayor of Sotteville-lès-Rouen
- In office 20 March 1989 – 5 April 2014
- Preceded by: René Salmon
- Succeeded by: Luce Pane

Personal details
- Born: 6 February 1942 Rouen, France
- Died: 27 March 2019 (aged 77) Saint-Aubin-lès-Elbeuf, France
- Party: Socialist Party
- Education: Lycée Pierre-Corneille

Pierre Bourguignon (French pronunciation: [pjɛʁ buʁɡiɲɔ̃]; 6 February 1942 – 27 March 2019) was a French politician who was a member of the National Assembly from 1981 to 1993, then from 1997 to 2012. He represented the Seine-Maritime department, and was a member of the Socialiste, radical, citoyen et divers gauche group. He was member of Socialist Party throughout his time serving in the National Assembly. Bourguignon was mayor of Sotteville-lès-Rouen from 1989 to 2014.

== Personal life ==
Bourguignon was born in Rouen, Seine-Maritime, and was educated at the Lycée Pierre-Corneille in Rouen.

Bourguignon died of a heart attack on 27 March 2019 in Saint-Aubin-lès-Elbeuf, Seine-Maritime, at the age of 77.
