= Canton of Le Grand-Quevilly =

Coordinates: 49.4167°N 1.0333°E

Le Grand-Quevilly
- Canton
- Country: France
- Region: Normandy
- Department: Seine-Maritime
- No. of communes: {{{nbcomm}}}
- Area: 23.9 km^{2} (9.2 sq mi)
- Population (2023): 34,472
  - Density: 1,440/km^{2} (3,740/sq mi)
- INSEE code: 76 13

The Canton of Le Grand-Quevilly is a canton situated in the Seine-Maritime département and in the Normandy region of northern France.

== Geography ==
An area of light industry and manufacturing situated on the left bank of the Seine, immediately south of Rouen in the arrondissement of Rouen, centred on the town of Le Grand-Quevilly.

== Composition ==
At the French canton reorganisation which came into effect in March 2015, the canton was expanded from 1 to 2 communes:

- Le Grand-Quevilly
- Petit-Couronne

== Population ==
Historical population
Year	Pop.	±% p.a.
2013	34,064	—
2018	34,426	+0.21%
Source: INSEE

== See also ==
- Arrondissements of the Seine-Maritime department
- Cantons of the Seine-Maritime department
- Communes of the Seine-Maritime department
