= Cantons of Rouen =

Coordinates: 49.44°N 1.09°E

The Cantons of Rouen are cantons situated in the Seine-Maritime département and in the Normandy region of northern France. Since the French canton reorganisation which came into effect in March 2015, the commune of Rouen is subdivided into 3 cantons:

- Canton of Rouen-1 (pop. 38,082)
- Canton of Rouen-2 (pop. 36,051)
- Canton of Rouen-3 (pop. 37,424)

== See also ==
- Arrondissements of the Seine-Maritime department
- Cantons of the Seine-Maritime department
- Communes of the Seine-Maritime department
