= History of Rouen =

History of French city

Rouen, France, was founded by the Gaulish tribe of Veliocasses, who controlled a large area in the lower Seine valley, which today retains a trace of their name as the Vexin. The Gauls named the settlement Ratumacos and the Romans called it Rotomagus. Roman Rotomagus was the second city of Gallia Lugdunensis, after Lugdunum (Lyon). After the reorganization of the empire by Diocletian, Rouen became the chief city of the divided province of Gallia Lugdunensis II and reached the peak of its Roman development, with an amphitheatre and thermae, the foundations of which remain today. In the 5th century, it became the seat of a bishopric and later a capital of Merovingian Neustria.

== The Middle Ages ==
After the first Viking incursion into the lower valley of the Seine in 841, they went on to overrun Rouen. Several decades later, after the failed siege of Chartres, the viking leader Rollo (Hrolfr) was nominated to be count of Rouen by King Charles in 911 in exchange for protecting the river from other incursions. In the 10th century Rouen became the capital of the Duchy of Normandy and the residence of the dukes, until William the Conqueror established his castle at Caen.

During the early 12th century, the city's population reached 30,000. In 1150, Rouen received its founding charter, which permitted self-government. During the 12th century, Rouen was probably the site of a Jewish yeshiva. At that time, about 6,000 Jews lived in the town, comprising about 20% of the total population. The well-preserved remains of a medieval Jewish building, that could be a yeshiva, were discovered in 1976 under the Rouen Law Courts.

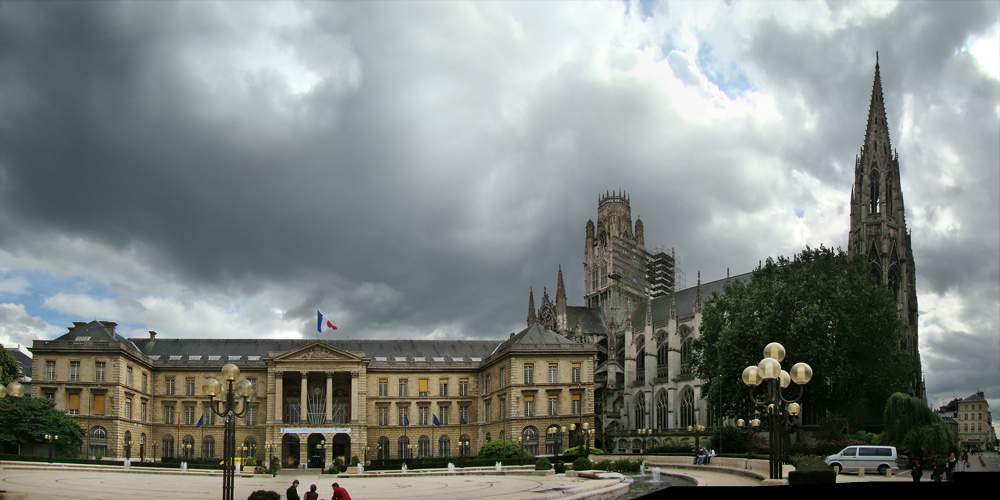
City Hall and Church of St. Ouen, Rouen

In 1200, a fire destroyed part of Rouen's Romanesque cathedral, leaving just St Romain's tower, the side porches of its front, and part of the nave. New work on the present Gothic cathedral of Rouen began, in the nave, transept, choir, and the lowest section of the lantern tower. On 24 June 1204, Philip Augustus entered Rouen and annexed Normandy to the Royal Demesne. The fall of Rouen meant the end of Normandy's vassal state status. He demolished the Norman castle and replaced it with his own, the Château Bouvreuil, built on the site of the Gallo-Roman amphitheatre.

A textile industry developed based on wool imported from England, competing with the northern County of Flanders and the Duchy of Brabant. The city found its market niche in the Champagne fairs. Rouen also depended on the river traffic of the Seine for its prosperity. Wine and wheat were exported to England, with tin and wool received in return.

In the late 13th century, urban strife threatened the city: in 1291, the mayor was assassinated and noble residences in the city were pillaged. Philip IV restored order and suppressed the city's charter and the city's lucrative monopoly on river traffic, but he was quite willing to allow the Rouennais to repurchase their former liberties in 1294. In 1306, he decided to expel the Jewish community of Rouen, which then numbered some five or six thousand in the city of 40,000 people.

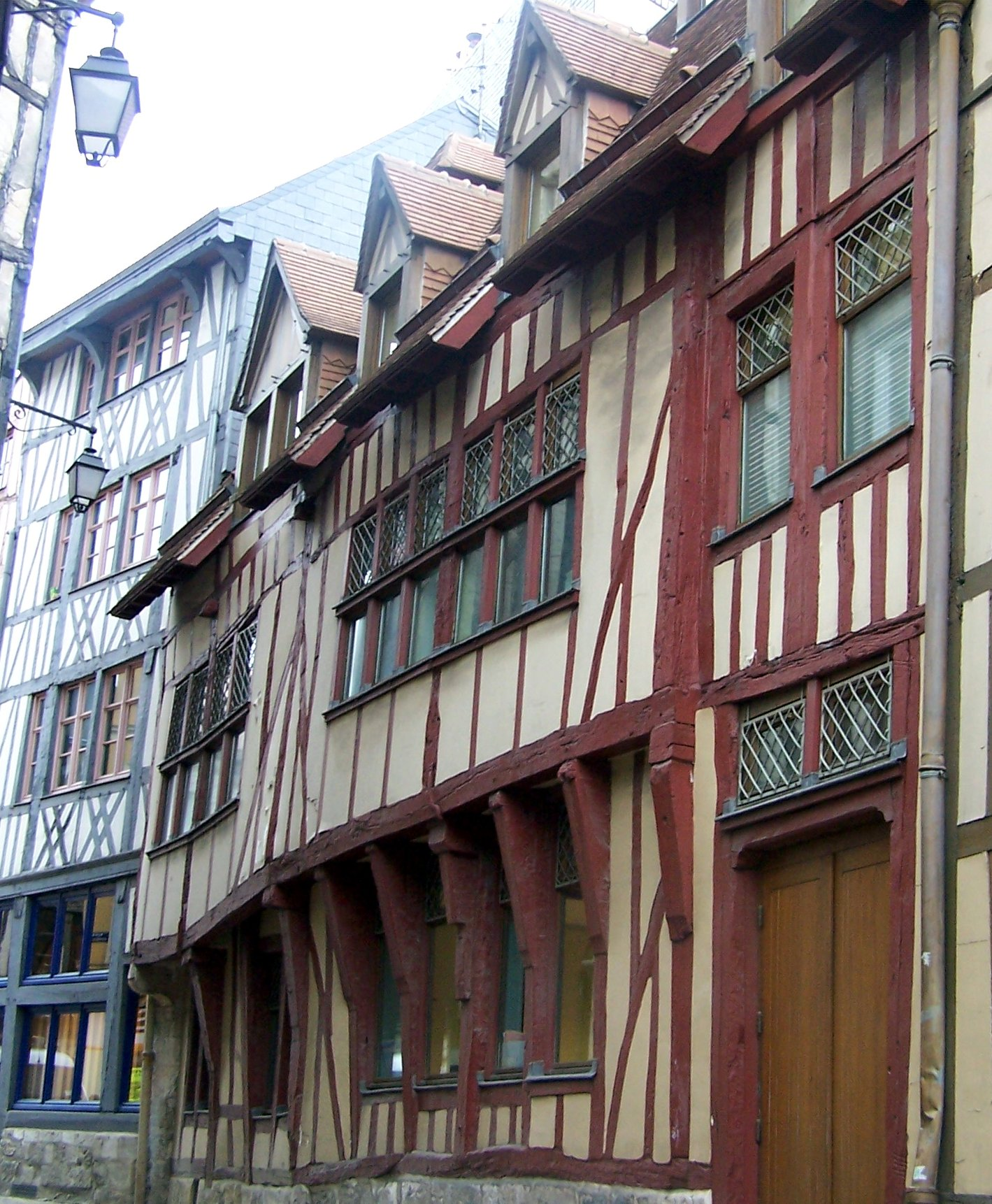
14th century timber framing, rue du Petit Mouton

In 1389, another urban revolt of the underclass broke out, the Harelle. It was part of a widespread rebellion in France that year and was suppressed with the withdrawal of Rouen's charter and river-traffic privileges once more.

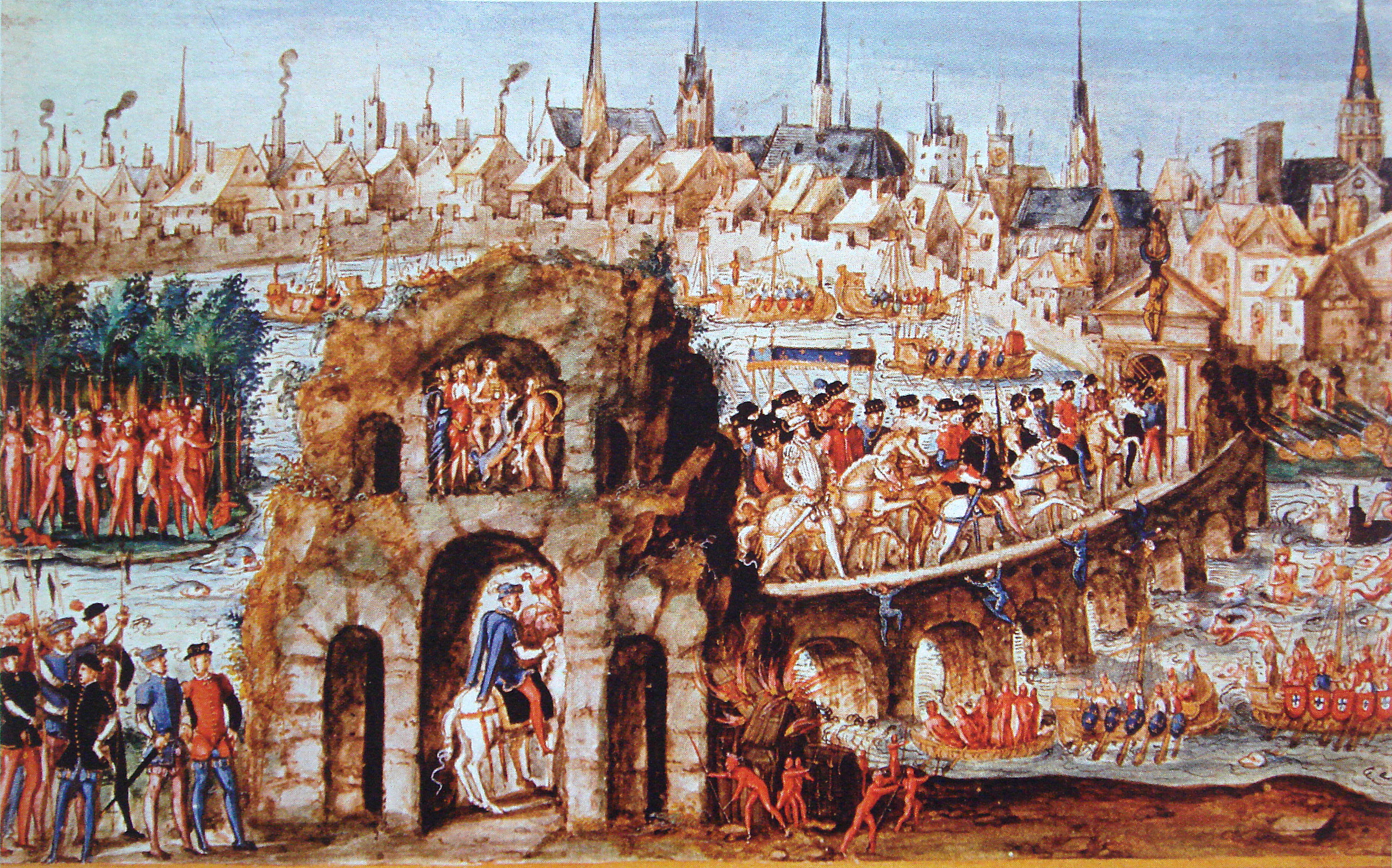
For the royal entry of Henry II in Rouen, 1 October 1550.

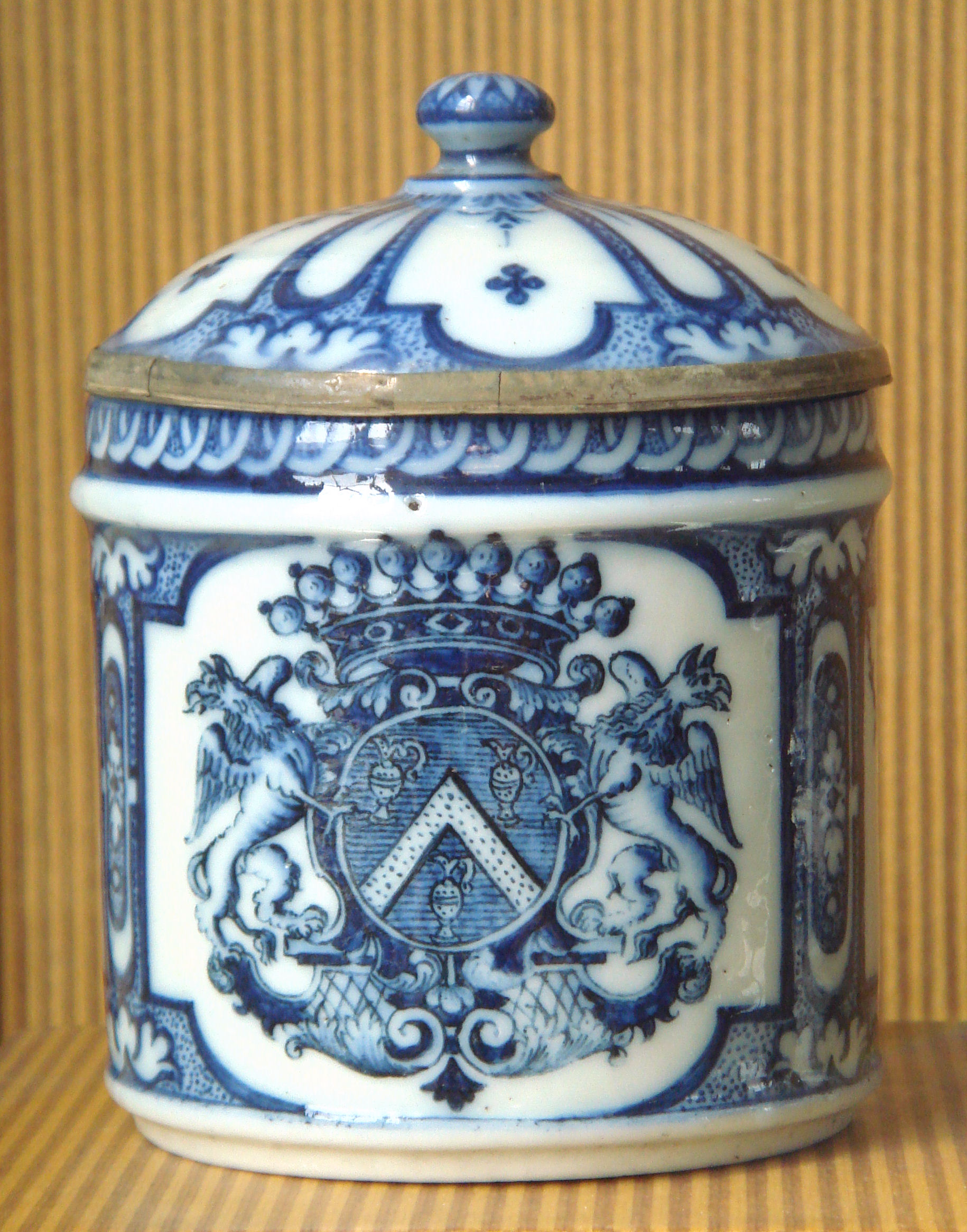
Rouen soft-paste porcelain was the first porcelain of France, dating from the end of the 17th century.

During the Hundred Years' War, on 19 January 1419, Rouen and its population of 70,000 surrendered to Henry V of England, who annexed Normandy once again to the Plantagenet domains. French soldier Alain Blanchard summarily hung English prisoners from the walls during the siege, for which he was beheaded; Canon and Vicar General of Rouen, Robert de Livet, excommunicated Henry V king, which occurred shortly after de Livet's own five year imprisonment in England.

Rouen became the capital of English power in France during the conflict. When the Duke of Bedford bought Joan of Arc her liberty from the Duke of Burgundy, who had been keeping her in jail since May 1430, she was sent to be tried in the city during Christmas 1430. After a long trial by a church court, she was sentenced to be burned at the stake. The sentence was carried out on 30 May 1431 in the city, and most residents supported the Duke of Burgundy, Joan of Arc's royal enemy. In that same year, the young Henry VI was crowned King of England and France in Paris before coming to Rouen where he was acclaimed by the crowds.

The king of France Charles VII recaptured the town in 1449, 18 years after the death of Joan of Arc and after 30 years of English occupation.

== The Renaissance Period ==
The naval dockyards, where activity had been slowed by the Hundred Years' War, became busy again as did the church of Saint-Maclou, which had been founded under English occupation. The nave of the church of Saint Ouen was completed at last. The salle des pas-perdus (a sort of waiting room or ante-room) of the present law courts was built during this time. The whole building was built in a flamboyant style into which the first decorative elements typical of the Renaissance style right at the beginning of the 16th century had been incorporated.

At that time Rouen was the fourth most populous city in the realm, after Paris, Marseille and Lyon. Rouen was also one of the Norman cradles of artistic Renaissance, in particular the one under the patronage of the archbishops and financiers of the town.

The city's economic upturn at the end of the 15th century was mainly due to the emergence of the cloth industry, but also partly due to the development of the silk industry and metallurgy. The fishermen of Rouen went as far afield as the Baltic to fish for herrings. Salt was imported from Portugal and Guérande. Cloth was exported to Spain who also provided wool, and the Medici family made Rouen into the main port for the resale of Roman alum.

At the beginning of the 16th century, Rouen became the main French port through which trade was conducted with Brazil, principally for the import of cloth dyes. By 1500, ten printing presses had been installed in the city following the installation of the first sixteen years earlier.

== The Wars of Religion ==
In the years following 1531, part of the population of Rouen embraced Calvinism. The members of the Reformed Church represented a quarter to a third of the total population, a significant minority.

In 1550, King Henry II staged a triumphant entry into Rouen, modeled on the ancient Roman triumph and specifically designed to ape Pompey's third triumph of 61 BC at Rome: "No less pleasing and delectable than the third triumph of Pompey... magnificent in riches and abounding in the spoils of foreign nations". It was not enough, however, to long sustain royal authority in the city.

From 1560 onwards, tensions rose between the Protestant and Catholic communities, and the Massacre of Vassy triggered the first of the French Wars of Religion. On 15 April 1562 the Protestants entered the town hall and ejected the King's personal representative. In May there was an outbreak of Iconoclasm (statue smashing). On 10 May the Catholic members of the town council fled Rouen. The Catholics in turn captured the Fort of Saint Catherine which overlooked the town. Both sides resorted to terror tactics.

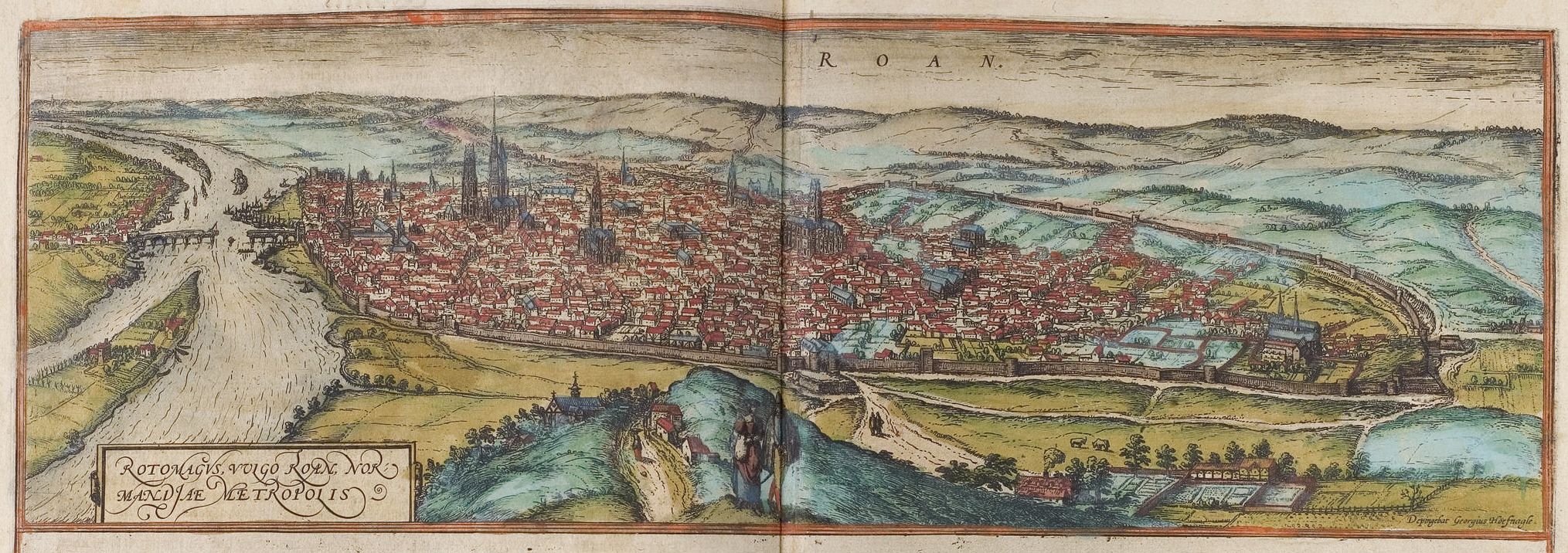
Overview of Rouen, 1572

At this juncture, the Protestant town authorities requested help from Queen Elizabeth I of England. In accordance with the Hampton Court Treaty which they had signed with Condé on 20 September 1562, the English sent troops to support the Protestants. On 26 October 1562 French Royalist troops retook Rouen and pillaged it for three days.

The news of the Massacre of St. Bartholomew's Day reached Rouen at the end of August 1572. Hennequier tried to avoid a massacre of the Protestants by shutting them up in various prisons. But between 17 and 20 September the crowds forced the gates of the prisons and murdered the Protestants that they found inside.

The town was attacked on several occasions by Henry IV of France, but it resisted, notably during the siege of December 1591 to May 1592, with the help of the Spanish army led by the Duke of Parma (see Siege of Rouen (1591)).

== The Early Modern Age ==
The permanent Exchequer of Normandy, which had been installed in Rouen in 1499 by George of Amboise, was transformed into a regional administrative assembly by Francis I in 1515 and up to the time of the Revolution was the administrative centre of the region. It had judicial, legislative and executive powers in Norman affairs and was only subordinate to the Privy Council. It also had power to govern French Canada. By the 1550s, Rouen reached a population of about 75,000 inhabitants and became the second largest city in France. During the early modern era, warfare was a common threat to the city of Rouen. There was military improvement in technology and organization; however, the siege of 1591–1592 concluded with high casualties. In the 16th century, The Protestant Reformation resulted in religious wars which caused a population decline in many areas of France. Until the 1750s a lot of cities, including Rouen, were in a stage of stagnation or decline of population.

The 16th and 18th centuries brought prosperity to the city through the textile trade and the increased use of port facilities, as well as the development of public transportation and other industries. In 1703, the Norman Chamber of Commerce was formed. Rouen was well known for the production of wool and faience – glazed ceramic ware; wool was the main source of wealth for the city. The printing industry was introduced to Rouen in 1485 and influenced its cultural and economic development. Rouen became a regional centre of production by introducing a variety of books to the industry. Although it did not have a university, Rouen became an important intellectual centre by reason of its reputed schools of higher learning. In 1734, a school of surgery was founded (second only to that of Paris, founded in 1724). In 1758 a new hospital was opened, to the west of the town, which replaced the old medieval one which had become too small. The Hôtel de Ville was completed in 1825.

== 19th and 20th centuries ==
During the Franco-Prussian War of 1870–1871, Rouen was occupied by the Prussians.

During the First World War, the British used Rouen as a supply base and there were many military hospitals.

During World War II, in 1940–1944, the town was occupied by Germany. Rouen was heavily damaged during the war – approximately 45% of the city was destroyed. In June 1940, the area between the Rouen Cathedral and the Seine river burned for 48 hours as the Germans did not allow firemen access to the fire. Other areas were destroyed between March and August 1944, just before and during the Battle of Normandy, which ended on the left bank of the Seine with the destruction of several regiments belonging to the German 7th Army. Rouen's cathedral and several significant monuments were damaged by Allied bombing. During the German occupation, Nazi Germany's Kriegsmarine had its headquarters located in a château on what is now the Rouen Business School (École Supérieure de Commerce de Rouen). The SS operated a subcamp of the V SS construction brigade in the city. Around 500 prisoners, mostly Polish and Soviet, were used as slave labour to build launching bases for the V-1 and V-2 rockets. Several prisoners died as they were forced to work even during air raids, and several others were executed either for escape attempts or for being no longer considered "fit for work". In August 1944, due to Allied advance, the Germans dissolved the subcamp and deported surviving prisoners to the Mittelbau-Dora concentration camp. The city was liberated by the Canadians on 30 August 1944 after the breakout from Normandy.

== See also ==
- Timeline of Rouen
