= Saint-Vigor-d'Ymonville =

- Commune
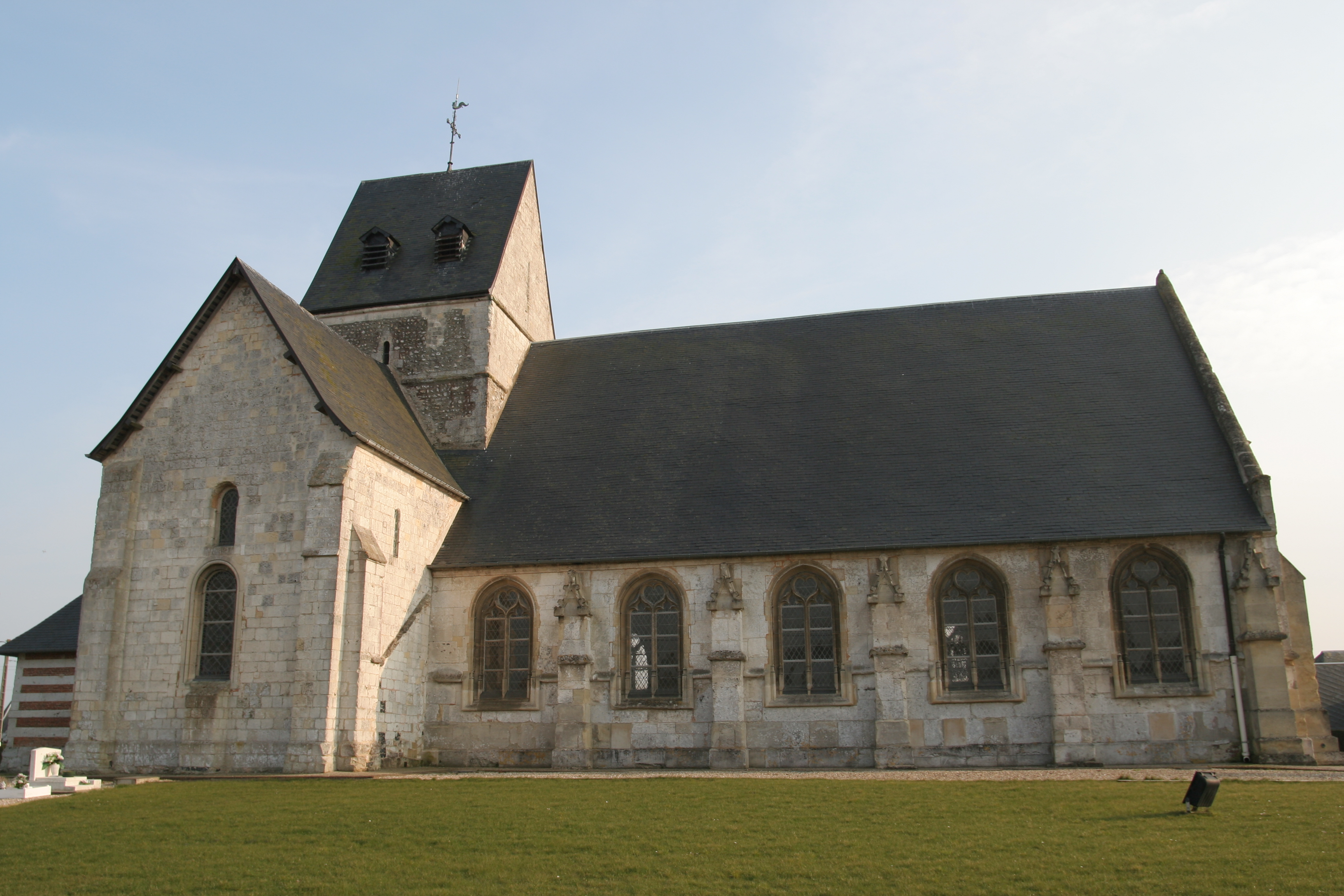
- The church in Saint-Vigor-d'Ymonville
- Location of Saint-Vigor-d'Ymonville
- Location within France Location within Normandy
- Coordinates: 49°29′46″N 0°21′42″E
- Country: France
- Region: Normandy
- Department: Seine-Maritime
- Arrondissement: Le Havre
- Canton: Saint-Romain-de-Colbosc
- Intercommunality: Le Havre Seine Métropole

Government
  - Mayor (2026–32): Sandrine Lemoine
- Area^{1}: 29.43 km^{2} (11.36 sq mi)
- Elevation: 112 m (367 ft)
- Highest elevation: 124 m (407 ft)
- Lowest elevation: 0 m (0 ft)
- Population (2023): 1,153
  - Density: 39.18/km^{2} (101.5/sq mi)
- Time zone: UTC+01:00 (CET)
  - Summer (DST): UTC+02:00 (CEST)
- INSEE/Postal code: 76657 /76430
- ^{1} French Land Register data, which excludes lakes, ponds, glaciers > 1 km^{2} (0.386 sq mi or 247 acres) and river estuaries.

Saint-Vigor-d'Ymonville (French pronunciation: [sɛ̃ viɡɔʁ dimɔ̃vil]) is a commune in the Seine-Maritime department in the Normandy region in northern France.

== Geography ==
Saint-Vigor-d'Ymonville is a farming and light industrial village, by the banks of the Seine, in the Pays de Caux, situated some 12 miles (19 km) east of Le Havre, at the junction of the D10 and D112 roads. The commune has two distinct parts: the north contains the village, farms and woodland, the south, separated by the A131 autoroute and the canal de Tancarville, has some port activity, quarrying and reclaimed marshland

== Population ==
Historical population
Year	Pop.	±% p.a.
1968	571	—
1975	647	+1.80%
1982	757	+2.27%
1990	835	+1.23%
1999	859	+0.32%
2007	958	+1.37%
2012	1,066	+2.16%
2017	1,130	+1.17%
2023	1,153	+0.34%
Source: INSEE

== Places of interest ==
- The twelfth-century church of St. Vigor.
- The ruins of the mediaeval priory.

== See also ==
- Communes of the Seine-Maritime department
