= Cantons of the Seine-Maritime department =

The following is a list of the 35 cantons of the Seine-Maritime department, in France, following the French canton reorganisation which came into effect in March 2015:

- Barentin
- Bois-Guillaume
- Bolbec
- Canteleu
- Caudebec-lès-Elbeuf
- Darnétal
- Dieppe-1
- Dieppe-2
- Elbeuf
- Eu
- Fécamp
- Gournay-en-Bray
- Le Grand-Quevilly
- Le Havre-1
- Le Havre-2
- Le Havre-3
- Le Havre-4
- Le Havre-5
- Le Havre-6
- Luneray
- Le Mesnil-Esnard
- Mont-Saint-Aignan
- Neufchâtel-en-Bray
- Notre-Dame-de-Bondeville
- Octeville-sur-Mer
- Le Petit-Quevilly
- Port-Jérôme-sur-Seine
- Rouen-1
- Rouen-2
- Rouen-3
- Saint-Étienne-du-Rouvray
- Saint-Romain-de-Colbosc
- Saint-Valery-en-Caux
- Sotteville-lès-Rouen
- Yvetot
