= Canton of Saint-Étienne-du-Rouvray =

Coordinates: 49°21′32″N 1°05′53″E

Saint-Étienne-du-Rouvray
- Canton
- Country: France
- Region: Normandy
- Department: Seine-Maritime
- No. of communes: {{{nbcomm}}}
- Population (2023): 35,224
- INSEE code: 76 31

The Canton of Saint-Étienne-du-Rouvray is a canton situated in the Seine-Maritime département and in the Normandy region of northern France.

== Geography ==
An area of quarries, forestry and light industry, situated on the left bank of the Seine immediately south of Rouen city centre. The altitude varies from 2m to 128m at (Oissel) with an average altitude of 22m.

== Composition ==
Since the French canton reorganisation which came into effect in March 2015, the canton consists of the following communes:

- Oissel
- Saint-Étienne-du-Rouvray (partly)

== Population ==
Historical population
Year	Pop.	±% p.a.
2013	31,369	—
2018	33,564	+1.36%
Source: INSEE

== See also ==
- Arrondissements of the Seine-Maritime department
- Cantons of the Seine-Maritime department
- Communes of the Seine-Maritime department
