= Oissel-sur-Seine =

- Commune
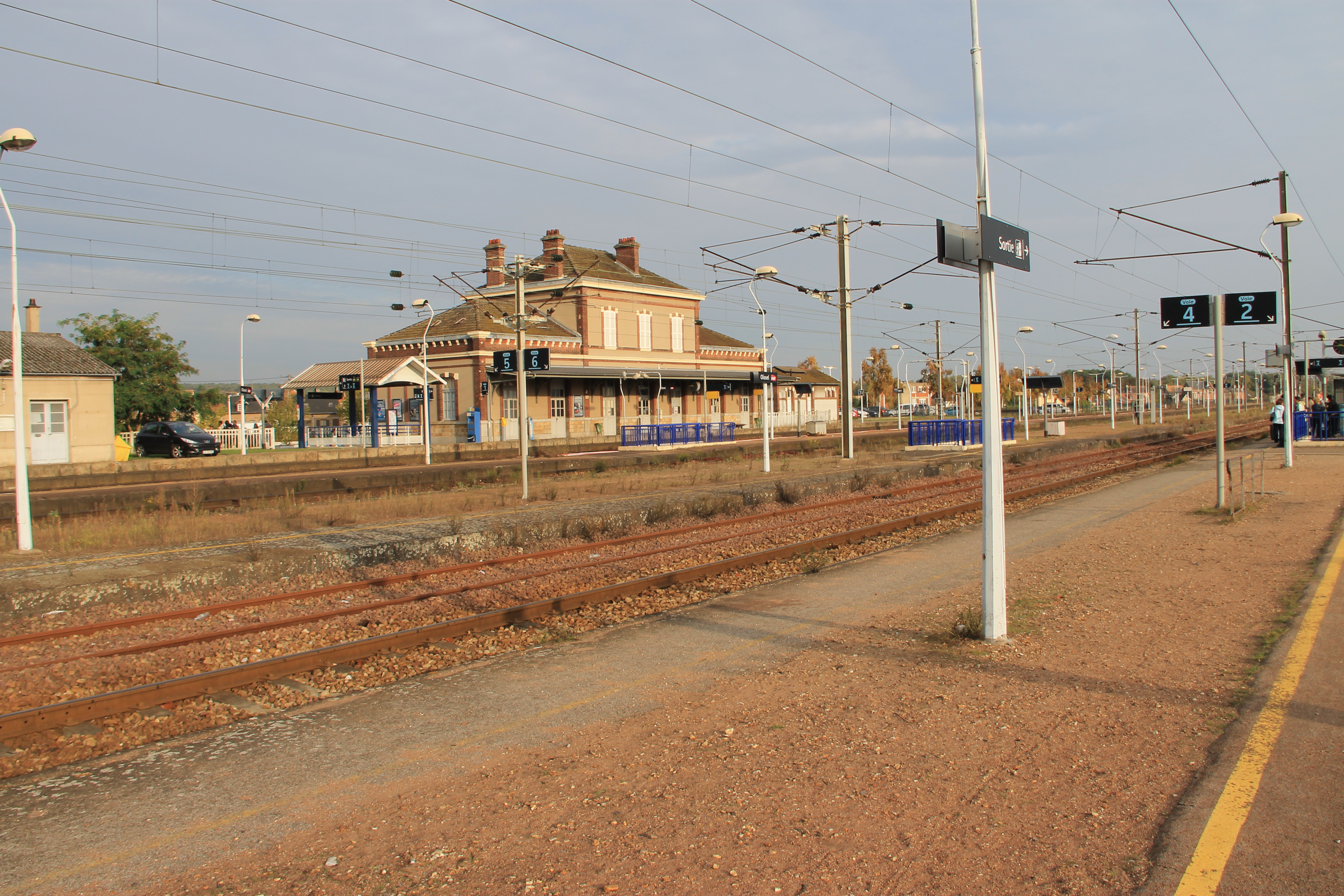
- Oissel-sur-Seine railway station

- Coat of arms
- Location of Oissel-sur-Seine
- Location within France Location within Normandy
- Coordinates: 49°20′33″N 1°05′32″E
- Country: France
- Region: Normandy
- Department: Seine-Maritime
- Arrondissement: Rouen
- Canton: Saint-Étienne-du-Rouvray
- Intercommunality: Métropole Rouen Normandie

Government
  - Mayor (2026–32): Stéphane Barré
- Area^{1}: 22.19 km^{2} (8.57 sq mi)
- Elevation: 10 m (33 ft)
- Highest elevation: 128 m (420 ft)
- Lowest elevation: 2 m (6.6 ft)
- Population (2023): 12,317
  - Density: 555.1/km^{2} (1,438/sq mi)
- Time zone: UTC+01:00 (CET)
  - Summer (DST): UTC+02:00 (CEST)
- INSEE/Postal code: 76484 /76350
- ^{1} French Land Register data, which excludes lakes, ponds, glaciers > 1 km^{2} (0.386 sq mi or 247 acres) and river estuaries.

Oissel-sur-Seine (before 2025: Oissel, French pronunciation: [wasɛl]) is a commune in the Seine-Maritime department in the Normandy region in northern France.

== Geography ==
A suburban and light industrial town situated by the banks of the river Seine, just 8 miles (13 km) south of Rouen at the junction of the D18 and the D13 roads. Junction 22 of the A13 autoroute is entirely within the commune's borders. SNCF operates a TER rail service here.

== History ==
The area around Oissel-sur-Seine was a common place for Viking raiders because of its location on the Seine river, during their raids on Francia. Eventually, the Vikings settled on one of the islands near Oissel and made it into a base, calling the island "Thorhólmr" meaning "Thor's Island".

During the battle of France, 9 June 1940, the French blew up several bridges and crossings over the Seine river around Oissel-sur-Seine to halt the German advance, including Viaduc de Oissel and Pont de Tourville-la-Rivière.

== Heraldry ==
Arms of Oissel	The arms of Oissel are blazoned : Per pale argent and azure, a half-filled alembic gules and a garb Or, and on a chief gules, a leopard Or, armed and langued azure.

== Population ==
Historical population
Year	Pop.	±% p.a.
1968	9,949	—
1975	10,501	+0.77%
1982	11,712	+1.57%
1990	11,444	−0.29%
1999	11,053	−0.39%
2007	11,574	+0.58%
2012	11,445	−0.22%
2017	11,895	+0.77%
2023	12,317	+0.58%
Source: INSEE

== Sport ==
CMS Oissel is a football club based in the commune, who play their home games at Stade Marcel Billard.

== People ==
- Daniel Horlaville, footballer born in 1945.
- Raoul Grimoin-Sanson (1860–1941), cinematographic inventor.
- Grégory Tafforeau, footballer born in 1976.
- Thierry Foucaud, 1954-, Politician.

== Places of interest ==
- The church of St.Martin, dating from the nineteenth century.
- The sixteenth century manorhouse, the Manoir de La Chapelle.
- The Dambray Pavillon, from the seventeenth century.
- The Château de La Perreuse.

== See also ==
- Communes of the Seine-Maritime department
