= Hubert Wulfranc =

French politician (born 1956)

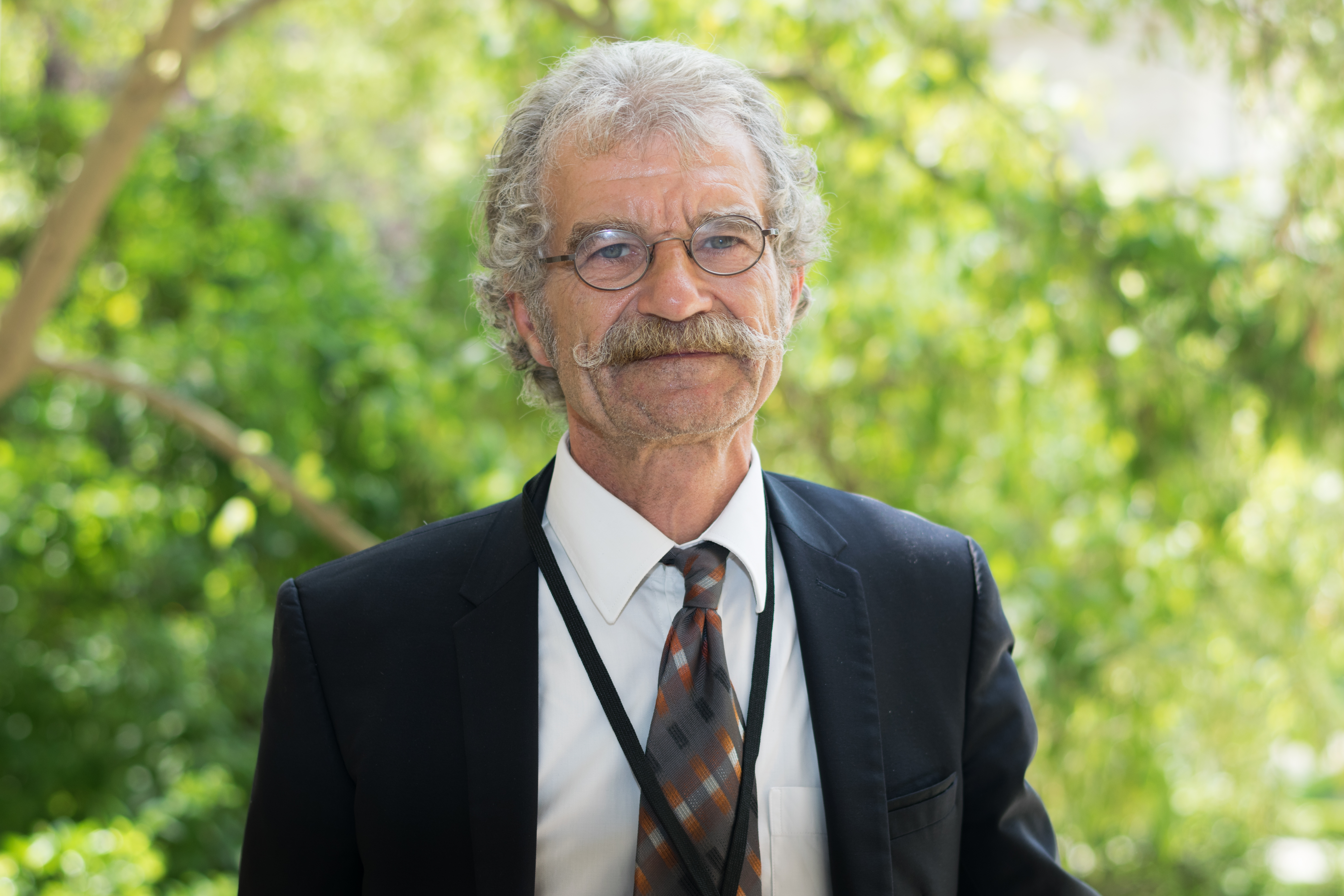
- Wulfranc in 2017

Member of the National Assembly for Seine-Maritime's 3rd constituency
- In office 21 June 2017 – 10 January 2024
- Preceded by: Luce Pane
- Succeeded by: Édouard Bénard

Mayor of Saint-Étienne-du-Rouvray
- In office 6 September 2002 – 6 July 2017
- Preceded by: Michel Grandpierre
- Succeeded by: Joachim Moyse

Personal details
- Born: 17 December 1956 (age 69) Rouen, France
- Party: French Communist Party
- Profession: Teacher

Hubert Wulfranc (born 17 December 1956) is a French politician who represented the 3rd constituency of the Seine-Maritime department in the National Assembly from the 2017 legislative election until his resignation in 2024. A member of the French Communist Party (PCF), he sat as part of the Democratic and Republican Left group.

== Early life and education ==
Hubert Wulfranc obtained a Master's degree in History in 1980.

From 1981 to 1996, he served as the chief of staff for Michel Grandpierre, the mayor of Saint-Étienne-du-Rouvray. From 1995 to 2002, he taught history-geography and French at the Fernand-Léger vocational high school in Grand-Couronne.
