= Déville-lès-Rouen =

- Commune
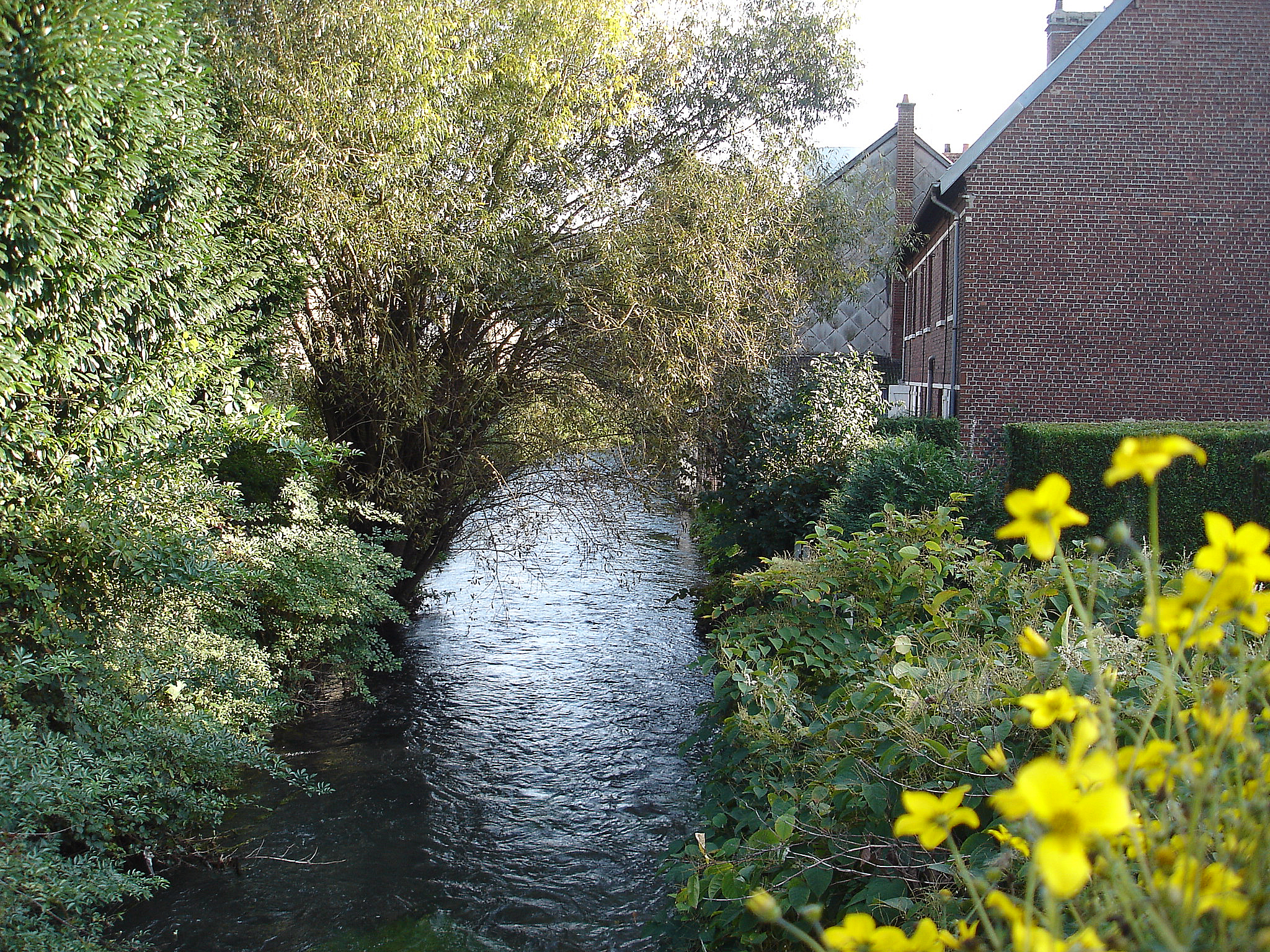
- The Cailly river in Déville-les-Rouen

- Coat of arms
- Location of Déville-lès-Rouen
- Location within France Location within Normandy
- Coordinates: 49°28′12″N 1°03′00″E
- Country: France
- Region: Normandy
- Department: Seine-Maritime
- Arrondissement: Rouen
- Canton: Mont-Saint-Aignan
- Intercommunality: Métropole Rouen Normandie

Government
  - Mayor (2026–32): Mirella Deloignon
- Area^{1}: 3.16 km^{2} (1.22 sq mi)
- Elevation: 17 m (56 ft)
- Highest elevation: 135 m (443 ft)
- Lowest elevation: 4 m (13 ft)
- Population (2023): 10,802
  - Density: 3,420/km^{2} (8,850/sq mi)
- Time zone: UTC+01:00 (CET)
  - Summer (DST): UTC+02:00 (CEST)
- INSEE/Postal code: 76216 /76250
- ^{1} French Land Register data, which excludes lakes, ponds, glaciers > 1 km^{2} (0.386 sq mi or 247 acres) and river estuaries.

Déville-lès-Rouen (French pronunciation: [devil lɛ ʁwɑ̃], literally Déville near Rouen) is a commune in the Seine-Maritime department of the Normandy region in north-western France.

== Geography ==
A suburban light industrial town situated by the banks of the Cailly, some 2 miles (3.2 km) northwest of the centre of Rouen at the junction of the D 66 and the D 6015 roads.

== Heraldry ==
Arms of Déville-lès-Rouen	The arms of Déville-lès-Rouen are blazoned: Azure, a Norman manor argent masoned sable overall a crozier Or, over that (and above the manor) a lamb reguardant haloed argent, and a base wavy azure [waves], and on a chief gules, a toothed wheel Or between 2 pairs of shuttles each pair in saltire argent.

== Population ==
Historical population

Year	Pop.	±% p.a.
1793	1,700	—
1800	1,550	−1.31%
1806	1,785	+2.38%
1821	2,706	+2.81%
1831	3,185	+1.64%
1836	3,916	+4.22%
1841	3,766	−0.78%
1846	3,887	+0.63%
1851	3,884	−0.02%
1856	3,816	−0.35%
1861	3,925	+0.56%
1866	4,583	+3.15%
1872	4,500	−0.30%
1876	4,458	−0.23%
1881	5,114	+2.78%
1886	5,281	+0.64%
1891	5,264	−0.06%
1896	5,653	+1.44%
1901	6,206	+1.88%

Year	Pop.	±% p.a.
1906	6,567	+1.14%
1911	6,887	+0.96%
1921	6,964	+0.11%
1926	7,139	+0.50%
1931	7,403	+0.73%
1936	7,567	+0.44%
1946	7,508	−0.08%
1954	8,037	+0.85%
1962	8,643	+0.91%
1968	9,622	+1.80%
1975	11,745	+2.89%
1982	11,136	−0.76%
1990	10,521	−0.71%
1999	10,441	−0.08%
2007	10,413	−0.03%
2012	10,272	−0.27%
2017	10,492	+0.42%
2023	10,802	+0.49%

Source: EHESS and INSEE (1968-2023)

== Places of interest ==
- The church of St.Pierre, dating from the nineteenth century.
- The ruins of a Rouen bishop's manor house dating from the thirteenth century.
- A sixteenth-century stone cross.

== Notable people ==
- Pierre Bérégovoy (1925–1993), politician, born in Déville-lès-Rouen
- Tony Parker, basketball player. He went to school in Déville-lès-Rouen at Sainte-Marie college.
- Alfred Louis Delattre (1850–1932), archeologist, born in Déville-lès-Rouen

== Twin towns ==
- Bargteheide, Germany
- Carmignano, Italy
- Syston, England

== See also ==
- Communes of the Seine-Maritime department
