= A131 autoroute =

Road in France

A131 autoroute

Route information
- Part of E5
- Maintained by SANEF Paris Normandie and DIR Nord-Ouest
- Length: 36.3 km (22.6 mi)
- Existed: 1974–present

Major junctions
- South-East end: E5 / E46 / A 13 in Bourneville-Sainte-Croix

- E44 / A 29 in Rogerville

- North-West end: E5 / N 282 in Gonfreville-l'Orcher

Location
- Country: France
- Major cities: Le Havre

Highway system
- Roads in France; Autoroutes; Routes nationales

The A131 Autoroute starts near Bourneville-Sainte-Croix close to exit 26 on the A13 and ends at the outskirts of Le Havre.

It is operated by the SANEF Paris Normandie and DIR Nord-Ouest. Its total length is 36.3 km (22.6 mi). Apart from the Pont de Tancarville where a toll is applicable, the motorway is toll-free. The road section on the Pont de Tancarville is renumbered RN182 to allow non-motorway traffic to cross the Seine.

== History ==
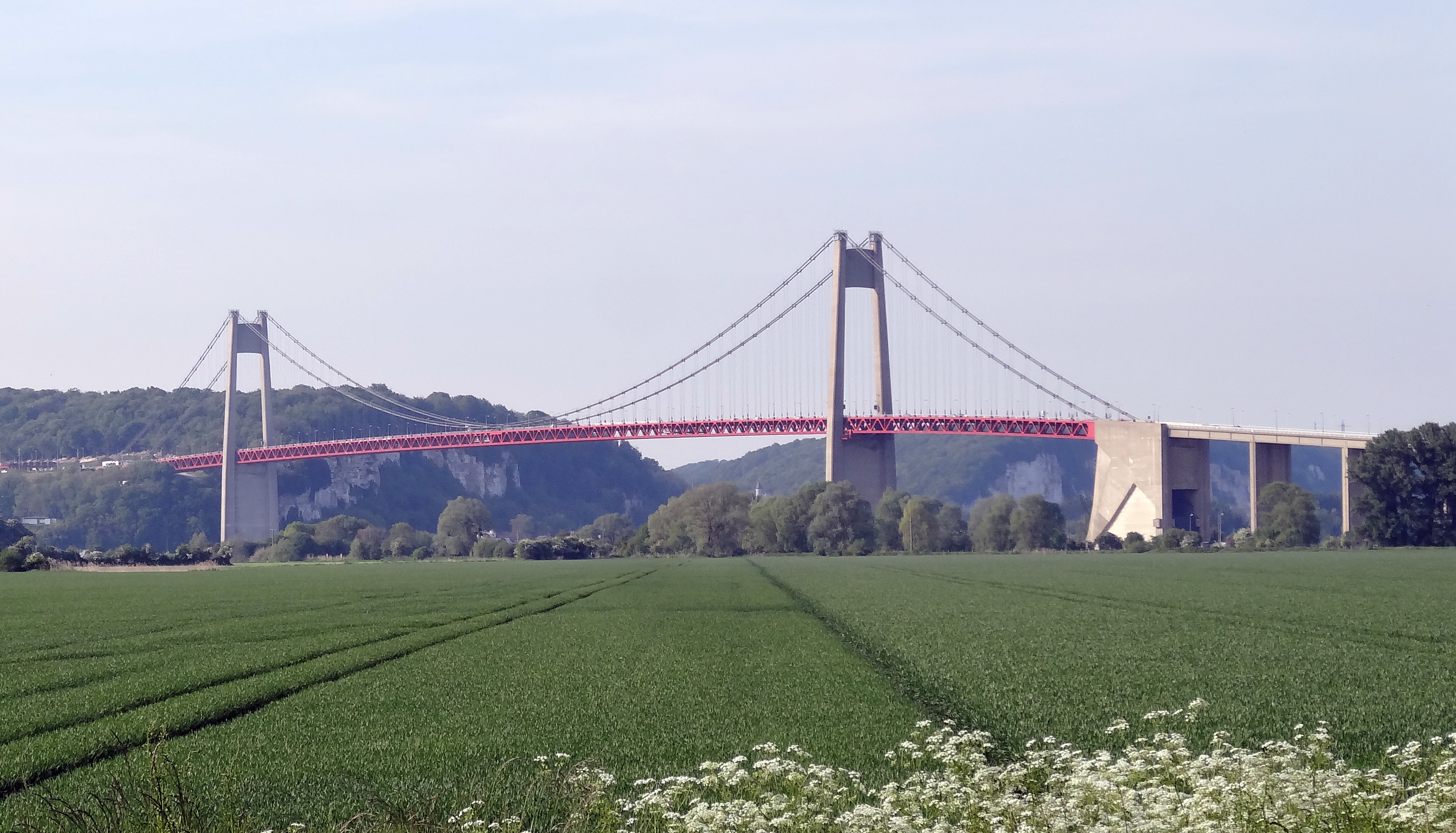
The Pont de Tancarville

This autoroute is the result of the merger of the former RN 182, transformed into a motorway between Bourneville-Sainte-Croix and the Pont de Tancarville, and the motorway linking the Pont de Tancarville to Le Havre, originally numbered A15.

== List of junctions ==
| Region | Department | Junction | Destinations | Notes |
|---|---|---|---|---|
| Normandie | Eure | A13 - A131 | Paris, Rouen - sud, Alençon, Évreux, Elbeuf | Entry and exit from Paris |
| Normandie | Eure | Péage de Bourneville (Flux Péage) | | |
| Normandie | Eure | 28 : Bourneville | Elbeuf, Bourgtheroulde, Brionne, Bourneville | Entry and exit from Le Havre |
| Normandie | Eure | 29 : Saint-Aubin-sur-Quillebeuf | Alençon, Pont-Audemer, Saint-Aubin-sur-Quillebeuf, Quillebeuf-sur-Seine, Sainte-Opportune | |
| Normandie | Eure | 30 : Quillebeuf | Beuzeville, Évreux | |
| Normandie | Eure | E5 / A 131 becomes E5 / N 182 | | |
| Normandie | Eure | Péage du Pont de Tancarville | | |
| Normandie | Seine-Maritime | 31 : Tancarville | Tancarville, Bolbec, Étretat, Saint-Romain-de-Colbosc | |
| Normandie | Seine-Maritime | 32 : Lillebonne | Lillebonne, Port Jérôme | |
| Normandie | Seine-Maritime | E5 / N 182 becomes E5 / A 131 | | |
| Normandie | Seine-Maritime | 33 : Le Hode | Saint-Vigor-d'Ymonville, Port 4000-6000, Port 5000-6000, Centre Routier | |
| Normandie | Seine-Maritime | A29 - A131 | Caen, Port du Havre, Pont de Normandie, Port 1000-3000 Dieppe, Calais, Amiens, Rouen - nord | |
| Normandie | Seine-Maritime | 34 : Rogerville-Oudalle | Rogerville-Oudalle | |
| Normandie | Seine-Maritime | E5 / A 131 becomes E5 / N 282 | | |
| Normandie | Seine-Maritime | Gonfreville-l'Orcher | Gonfreville-l'Orcher, Harfleur | Entry and exit from A13 |
| Normandie | Seine-Maritime | Port 3000-4000 | Le Havre - sud, Montivilliers, Havre - Nord | Entry and exit from A13 |
| Normandie | Seine-Maritime | Mayville | Gonfreville-l'Orcher | Exit from A13 |
| Normandie | Seine-Maritime | RD 6015 - RN 282 | Rouen, Amiens, Fécamp, Dieppe, Harfleur, Gonfreville-l'Orcher, Montivilliers | Entry and exit from Le Havre |
E5 / N 282 becomes E5 / D 6015 and enters in Le Havre
1.000 mi = 1.609 km; 1.000 km = 0.621 mi
