= Édouard Bénard =

French politician (born 1995)

- A photo of Édouard Bénard

Member of the French National Assembly for Seine-Maritime's 3rd constituency
- Incumbent
- Assumed office 10 January 2024
- Preceded by: Hubert Wulfranc

Personal details
- Born: 18 February 1995 (age 31)
- Party: French Communist Party
- Other political affiliations: New Popular Front

Édouard Bénard (born 18 February 1995) is a French politician of the French Communist Party serving as a member of the National Assembly for Seine-Maritime's 3rd constituency. He took office in January 2024, succeeding Hubert Wulfranc upon his resignation. He was re-elected in the 2024 legislative election.

== Biography ==
Édouard Bénard was born in Rouen into a working-class family. The son of a cleaning lady and a building surveyor, at the age of 15 he was steered towards a vocational training certificate (CAP) apprenticeship in Butcher.

He then resumed a general high school curriculum, which enabled him to pursue studies in philosophy at the Paris-Sorbonne University. He worked in a bakery alongside his studies.

He is then a local French civil service.
