= Canton of Le Petit-Quevilly =

Coordinates: 49.4333°N 1.0333°E

Le Petit-Quevilly
- Canton
- Country: France
- Region: Normandy
- Department: Seine-Maritime
- No. of communes: {{{nbcomm}}}
- Population (2023): 29,914
- INSEE code: 76 27

The Canton of Le Petit-Quevilly is a canton situated in the Seine-Maritime département and in the Normandy region of northern France.

== Geography ==
A town of light industry and manufacturing situated on the left bank of the Seine, immediately south of Rouen in the arrondissement of Rouen. The altitude varies from 3m to 33m with an average altitude of 5m.

== Composition ==
At the French canton reorganisation which came into effect in March 2015, the canton was expanded from 1 to 2 communes:

- Petit-Quevilly
- Sotteville-lès-Rouen (partly)

== Population ==
Historical population
Year	Pop.	±% p.a.
2013	29,961	—
2018	29,843	−0.08%
Source: INSEE

== See also ==
- Arrondissements of the Seine-Maritime department
- Cantons of the Seine-Maritime department
- Communes of the Seine-Maritime department
