= Petit-Couronne =

- Commune
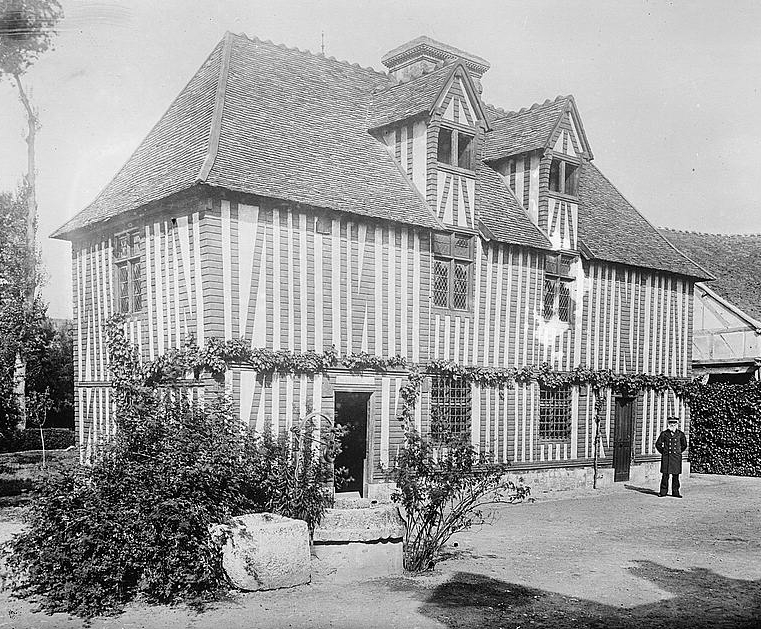
- Pierre Corneille's house

- Coat of arms
- Location of Petit-Couronne
- Location within France Location within Normandy
- Coordinates: 49°23′11″N 1°01′42″E
- Country: France
- Region: Normandy
- Department: Seine-Maritime
- Arrondissement: Rouen
- Canton: Le Grand-Quevilly
- Intercommunality: Métropole Rouen Normandie

Government
  - Mayor (2020–2026): Joël Bigot
- Area^{1}: 12.8 km^{2} (4.9 sq mi)
- Elevation: 15 m (49 ft)
- Highest elevation: 108 m (354 ft)
- Lowest elevation: 2 m (6.6 ft)
- Population (2023): 8,683
  - Density: 678/km^{2} (1,760/sq mi)
- Time zone: UTC+01:00 (CET)
  - Summer (DST): UTC+02:00 (CEST)
- INSEE/Postal code: 76497 /76650
- ^{1} French Land Register data, which excludes lakes, ponds, glaciers > 1 km^{2} (0.386 sq mi or 247 acres) and river estuaries.

Petit-Couronne (French pronunciation: [pəti kuʁɔn], before 1984: Le Petit-Couronne) is a commune in the Seine-Maritime department in the Normandy region in northern France.

== Geography ==
A port town of oil refineries, light industry and forestry situated by the banks of the Seine, just 4 miles (6.4 km) south of the centre of Rouen at the junction of the D3 and the N338 roads.

== Coat of arms ==
Arms of Petit-Couronne	The arms of Petit-Couronne are blazoned : Azure, an anchor argent surmounted by 2 torches in saltire Or, and on a chief wavy azure fimbriatd argent, 3 lions heads erased gules. (created 1986)

== Population ==
Historical population
Year	Pop.	±% p.a.
1968	4,861	—
1975	5,686	+2.26%
1982	6,340	+1.57%
1990	8,122	+3.14%
1999	8,621	+0.66%
2007	9,057	+0.62%
2012	9,278	+0.48%
2017	8,619	−1.46%
2023	8,683	+0.12%
Source: INSEE

== Places of interest ==
- Menhirs from pre-Roman times.
- The church of St. Aubin, dating from the seventeenth century.
- The sixteenth-century house of writer Pierre Corneille, now a museum.
- Several 17th/18th-century houses and a dovecote.

== People ==
- Pierre Corneille, writer, poet and dramatist once lived here.
- Marcelly, full name Marcel Jules Turmel, Music-hall singer (1882-1966)
- Germaine Beaumont, writer and journalist, was born here.

== Twin towns ==
- Ahlem, Hanover, Germany
- Beccles, England
- Vila Verde, Portugal

== See also ==
- Communes of the Seine-Maritime department
