= Rogerville =

- Commune
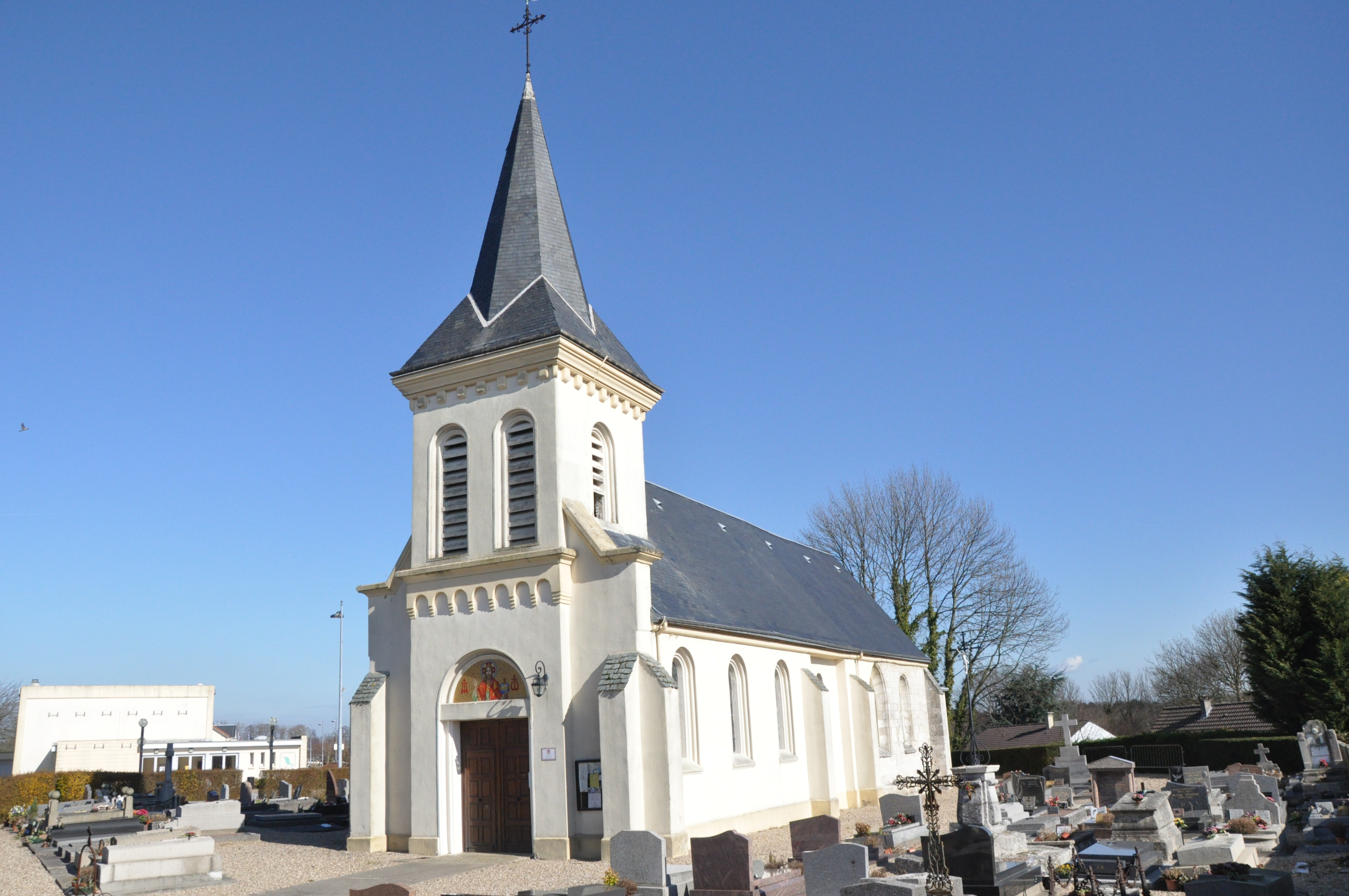
- The church in Rogerville
- Location of Rogerville
- Location within France Location within Normandy
- Coordinates: 49°30′17″N 0°16′00″E
- Country: France
- Region: Normandy
- Department: Seine-Maritime
- Arrondissement: Le Havre
- Canton: Le Havre-3
- Intercommunality: Le Havre Seine Métropole

Government
  - Mayor (2020–2026): Avelyne Chirol
- Area^{1}: 9.5 km^{2} (3.7 sq mi)
- Elevation: 100 m (330 ft)
- Highest elevation: 106 m (348 ft)
- Lowest elevation: 0 m (0 ft)
- Population (2023): 1,734
  - Density: 180/km^{2} (470/sq mi)
- Time zone: UTC+01:00 (CET)
  - Summer (DST): UTC+02:00 (CEST)
- INSEE/Postal code: 76533 /76700
- ^{1} French Land Register data, which excludes lakes, ponds, glaciers > 1 km^{2} (0.386 sq mi or 247 acres) and river estuaries.

Rogerville is a commune in the Seine-Maritime department in the Normandy region in northern France.

== Geography ==
A village with light industry in its southern sector and farming in the northern part, in the Pays de Caux, situated some 9 miles (14 km) east of Le Havre, at the junction of the A131 autoroute with junction 5 of the A29 autoroute as it crosses the canal de Tancarville, the canal du Havre and the river Seine.

== Population ==
Historical population
Year	Pop.	±% p.a.
1968	800	—
1975	752	−0.88%
1982	1,006	+4.24%
1990	1,245	+2.70%
1999	1,257	+0.11%
2007	1,253	−0.04%
2012	1,242	−0.18%
2017	1,416	+2.66%
2023	1,734	+3.43%
Source: INSEE

== Places of interest ==
- A nineteenth-century church.

== See also ==
- Communes of the Seine-Maritime department
