= Canton of Le Havre-3 =

Coordinates: 49.49°N 0.14°E

- Canton
- Situation of the canton of Le Havre-3 in the department of Seine-Maritime
- Country: France
- Region: Normandy
- Department: Seine-Maritime
- No. of communes: {{{nbcomm}}}
- Population (2023): 36,443
- INSEE code: 7616

The canton of Le Havre-3 is an administrative division of the Seine-Maritime department, in northern France. Its borders were modified at the French canton reorganisation which came into effect in March 2015. Its seat is in Le Havre.

It consists of the following communes:

1. Gainneville
2. Gonfreville-l'Orcher
3. Le Havre (partly)
4. Rogerville
