= Canton of Sotteville-lès-Rouen =

Coordinates: 49.41°N 1.09°E

- Canton
- Situation of the canton of Sotteville-lès-Rouen in the department of Seine-Maritime
- Country: France
- Region: Normandy
- Department: Seine-Maritime
- No. of communes: {{{nbcomm}}}
- Population (2023): 27,908
- INSEE code: 7634

The canton of Sotteville-lès-Rouen is an administrative division of the Seine-Maritime department, in northern France. It was created at the French canton reorganisation which came into effect in March 2015. Its seat is in Sotteville-lès-Rouen.

It consists of the following communes:

1. Saint-Étienne-du-Rouvray (partly)
2. Sotteville-lès-Rouen (partly)
