= SS construction brigade =

External image
- Prisoners of the 2nd SS Construction Brigade in Bremen, 1943 (source)

The SS-Baubrigaden were a type of subcamp of Nazi concentration camps that were first established in Autumn 1942. These units were usually made up of male non-Jewish prisoners—most were Poles or Soviets. Chances of survival were higher in these mobile units than the main camps they were attached to. The deployment of the Baubrigaden to major cities within the German Reich was the first time the German public became aware of the living conditions in concentration camps.

By the end of the war there were 13 Baubridgaden made up of around 9,500 prisoners. There were around 1,000 prisoners in each Baubrigaden and it is estimated that at least 17,000 male prisoners were part of the Baubrigaden system between 1942 and 1945. The Baubrigaden were mostly made up of prisoners from Buchenwald, Neuengamme and Sachsenhausen, while the SS-Eisenbahnbaubrigaden were mainly from Auschwitz and Dachau.

The proposal to form mobile labor units was first floated by Hans Kammler in 1942 in a paper called Vorschlag fur die Aufstellung von SS-Baubrigaden ("Suggestions for the Establishment of SS Construction"). In the paper he estimated that Heinrich Himmler's Friedenshauprogramm in the East—which called for the construction of settlements, camps and supply depots in the newly conquered territories—would require "a construction volume of between 20 and 30 billion Reichsmark" and 175,000 prisoners. Under Kammler's proposal, these prisoners would have formed 4,800 man labor detachments that could move between construction sites.

These plans had to be revised in 1942 when the German armaments industry began to demand more labor. As fighting intensified in 1942, Himmler ordered that the SS-Baubrigaden be deployed to clean up German cities that had been destroyed in the British bombing campaign. Albert Speer, who was Reich Minister for Armament and Munitions, was closely involved with the Baubrigaden.

In September 1942 Baubrigaden were deployed to Bremen, Osnabrück, Düsseldorf, Duisburg and Cologne to construct emergency shelters and clear rubble in the aftermath of bombings. They also had to recover dead bodies from the rubble and recover unexploded bombs. Though working conditions were poor, chances of survival were higher in the Baubrigaden subcamps because prisoners were more likely to find food.

By 1943, the Reich Ministry of Armaments and War Production determined that the diversion of workers to cleanup efforts was hurting armaments production.
