= Gainneville =

- Commune
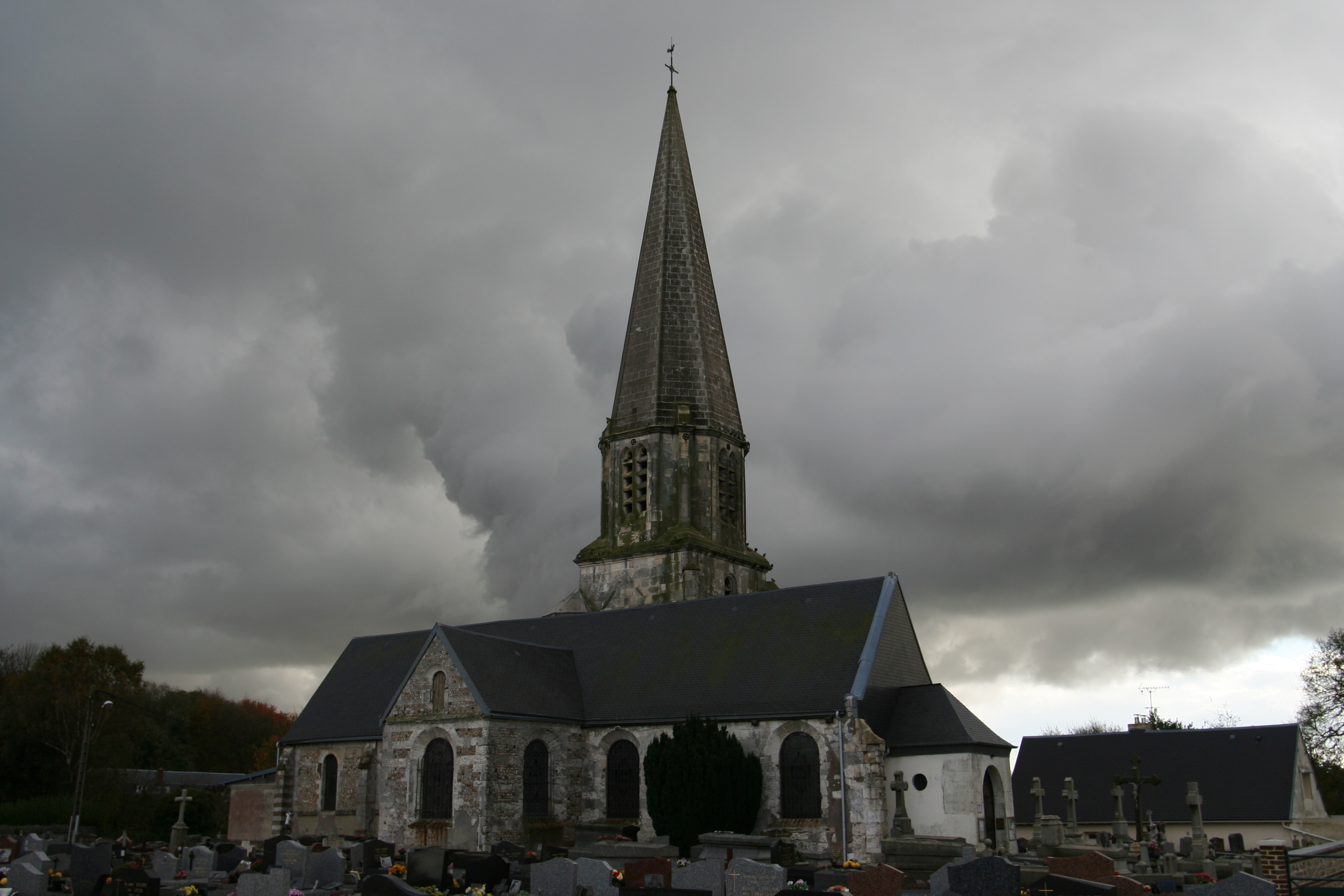
- The church in Gainneville
- Location of Gainneville
- Location within France Location within Normandy
- Coordinates: 49°31′07″N 0°15′08″E
- Country: France
- Region: Normandy
- Department: Seine-Maritime
- Arrondissement: Le Havre
- Canton: Le Havre-3
- Intercommunality: Le Havre Seine Métropole

Government
  - Mayor (2020–2026): Martial Galopin
- Area^{1}: 4.65 km^{2} (1.80 sq mi)
- Elevation: 90 m (300 ft)
- Highest elevation: 107 m (351 ft)
- Lowest elevation: 25 m (82 ft)
- Population (2023): 2,548
  - Density: 548/km^{2} (1,420/sq mi)
- Time zone: UTC+01:00 (CET)
  - Summer (DST): UTC+02:00 (CEST)
- INSEE/Postal code: 76296 /76700
- ^{1} French Land Register data, which excludes lakes, ponds, glaciers > 1 km^{2} (0.386 sq mi or 247 acres) and river estuaries.

Gainneville (French pronunciation: [ɡɛnvil]) is a commune in the Seine-Maritime department in the Normandy region in northern France.

== Geography ==
Gainneville is a small farming town situated in the Pays de Caux, 7 miles (11 km) east of Le Havre, at the junction of the D6015 (ex-N15) and D111 roads.

== Population ==
Historical population
Year	Pop.	±% p.a.
1968	1,070	—
1975	1,154	+1.09%
1982	1,589	+4.68%
1990	2,219	+4.26%
1999	2,370	+0.73%
2007	2,612	+1.22%
2012	2,676	+0.49%
2017	2,582	−0.71%
2023	2,548	−0.22%
Source: INSEE

== Places of interest ==
- The church of St.Pierre, dating from the sixteenth century.

== Notable people ==
The professionnel footballers, Anthony Le Tallec and his brother Damien Le Tallec, are originally from Gainneville.

== See also ==
- Communes of the Seine-Maritime department
