= Canton of Rouen-1 =

Rouen-1
- Canton for the Departmental Council of Seine-Maritime
- Situation of the canton of Barentin in the department
- Department: Seine-Maritime
- Population: 41,742 (2022)
- Electorate: 20,473 (2024)
- Major settlements: Rouen

Current Canton
- Created: 2015
- Members: Marie Fouquet (PS); Valentin Rasse Lambrecq (PS)
- Seats: Two
- Former cantons: Rouen-1; Rouen-3

The canton of Rouen-1 is an electoral district of the Seine-Maritime department, in northern France. It elects two departmental counselors sitting in the Departmental Council of Seine-Maritime. It was created at the French canton reorganisation which came into effect in March 2015. It is entirerly located in Rouen.

== Population ==
Historical population
Year	Pop.	±% p.a.
2013	37,826	—
2018	38,073	+0.13%
2022	41,742	+2.33%
Source: INSEE

== Councillors ==
Election	Member	Party	Elected offices
2015	Jean-François Bures	LR	Municipal councillor of Rouen
2015	Marine Caron	UDI	Municipal councillor of Rouen
2021	Marie Fouquet	PS	Municipal councillor of Rouen
2021	Valentin Rasse Lambrecq	PS	Municipal councillor of Rouen

== Election results ==
=== 2021 ===
Pairs	Party	Nuance	First round		Second round	
Pairs	Party	Nuance	Votes	%	Votes	%
Jean-François Bures	LR	UCD	2,169	37.97	2,844	49.03
Marine Caron	UDI	UCD	2,169	37.97	2,844	49.03
Marie Fouquet	PS	SOC	2,136	37.39	2,956	50.97
Valentin Rasse Lambrecq	PS	SOC	2,136	37.39	2,956	50.97
Christiane Espanet	LFI	UG	661	11.57		
Jean-Pierre Tredet	PCF	UG	661	11.57		
Florent Sené	RN	RN	636	11.13		
Laury Thirion	RN	RN	636	11.13		
Basile Gonzales	POI	EXG	110	1.93		
Céline Vitard	POI	EXG	110	1.93		
Votes			5,712	100.00	5,800	100.00
Valid votes			5,712	97.24	5,800	95.05
Blank votes			110	1.87	215	3.52
Null votes			52	0.89	87	1.43
Turnout			5,874	31.86	6,102	33.09
Abstentions			12,564	68.14	12,337	66.91
Registered voters			18,438		18,439	
Result			PS GAIN from LR			
Result			PS GAIN from UDI			

=== 2015 ===
Pairs	Party	Nuance	First round		Second round	
Pairs	Party	Nuance	Votes	%	Votes	%
Jean-François Bures	UMP	UD	2,988	36.56	3,928	52.56
Marine Caron	UDI	UD	2,988	36.56	3,928	52.56
Sarah Balluet	PS	PS	2,532	30.98	3,546	47.44
Éric de Falco	PS	PS	2,532	30.98	3,546	47.44
Jean-François Bollens	FN	FN	1,403	17.17		
Camille Bossert	FN	FN	1,403	17.17		
Raphaëlle Brangier	E!	FG	1,249	15.28		
Yves Soret	ND	FG	1,249	15.28		
Votes			8,172	100.00	7,474	100.00
Valid votes			8,172	95.86	7,474	93.08
Blank votes			259	3.04	393	4.89
Null votes			94	1.1	163	2.03
Turnout			8,525	47.4	8,030	44.65
Abstentions			9,459	52.6	9,955	55.35
Registered voters			17,984		17,985	
Result			UMP WIN (new seat)			
Result			UDI WIN (new seat)			
