= Gonfreville-l'Orcher =

- Commune
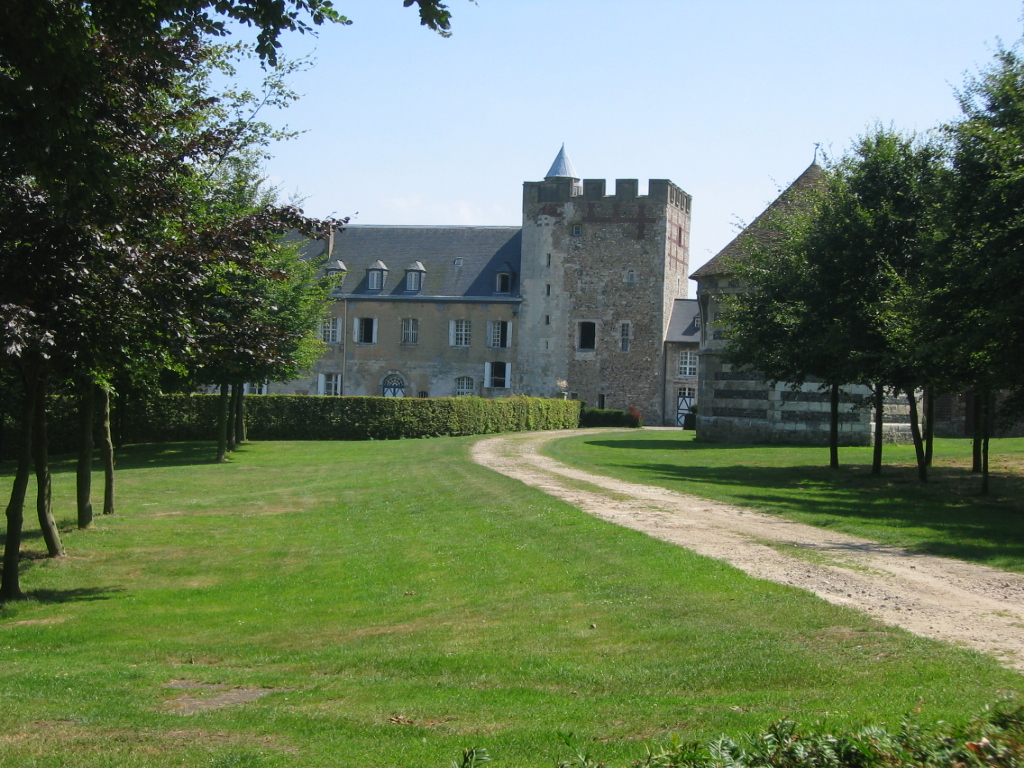
- Château at Gonfreville-l'Orcher

- Coat of arms
- Location of Gonfreville-l'Orcher
- Location within France Location within Normandy
- Coordinates: 49°30′21″N 0°14′03″E
- Country: France
- Region: Normandy
- Department: Seine-Maritime
- Arrondissement: Le Havre
- Canton: Le Havre-3
- Intercommunality: Le Havre Seine Métropole

Government
  - Mayor (2026–32): Alban Bruneau
- Area^{1}: 25.81 km^{2} (9.97 sq mi)
- Elevation: 90 m (300 ft)
- Highest elevation: 102 m (335 ft)
- Lowest elevation: 0 m (0 ft)
- Population (2023): 8,916
  - Density: 345.4/km^{2} (894.7/sq mi)
- Time zone: UTC+01:00 (CET)
  - Summer (DST): UTC+02:00 (CEST)
- INSEE/Postal code: 76305 /76700
- ^{1} French Land Register data, which excludes lakes, ponds, glaciers > 1 km^{2} (0.386 sq mi or 247 acres) and river estuaries.

Gonfreville-l'Orcher (French pronunciation: [ɡɔ̃fʁəvil lɔʁʃe]) is a commune in the Seine-Maritime department in the Normandy region in northern France.

== Geography ==
An industrial town based around an ancient village situated in the Pays de Caux, some 5 miles (8.0 km) east of Le Havre, in between the D982 and D9015 roads. The A131 autoroute cuts through the middle of the commune alongside the banks of the Tancarville canal. The economy depends mainly on the industrial area of the Port of the Lower-Seine (chemical works and refineries) and the commercial area known as Camp-Dolent.

== History ==
The etymology of the first part of the name is Gunfridr's farm, a Scandinavian farmer who probably settled in the 10th century.

The Orcher suffix comes from the name of the first seigneurs of the village, now corrupted to Orcher, but originally Aurichier (alor = alder and kjarr / ker = marsh. Cf. Ellerker, Yorkshire), that took themselves in turn their name from the same place, where the chateau is located.

The commune was created and recorded in 1251 with the merger of the two parishes of Gonfreville and Gournay. A priory had stood here since 1024 but long before that, Bronze Age people had been here, witnessed by the tools unearthed during the 19th century and the name Gournay is a Celtic archetype *Gornako, connected with a wet place.

== Population ==
Historical population
Year	Pop.	±% p.a.
1968	8,636	—
1975	10,173	+2.37%
1982	10,345	+0.24%
1990	10,202	−0.17%
1999	9,938	−0.29%
2007	9,145	−1.03%
2012	9,153	+0.02%
2017	9,057	−0.21%
2023	8,916	−0.26%
Source: INSEE

== Places of interest ==
- The church of St. Erconwald, dating from the nineteenth century.
- The remains of a feudal motte.
- The eighteenth century château d'Orcher
- Vestiges of the medieval castle d'Orcher in the park of the present-day chateau.
- The Renaissance manorhouse de Bévilliers (sixteenth century).
- The church of Notre-Dame, dating from the seventeenth century.
- The chapel at Dignefort, dating from the thirteenth century (Now a private house).
- A fifteenth century dovecote.

== See also ==
- Communes of the Seine-Maritime department
