= Sotteville-lès-Rouen =

- Commune
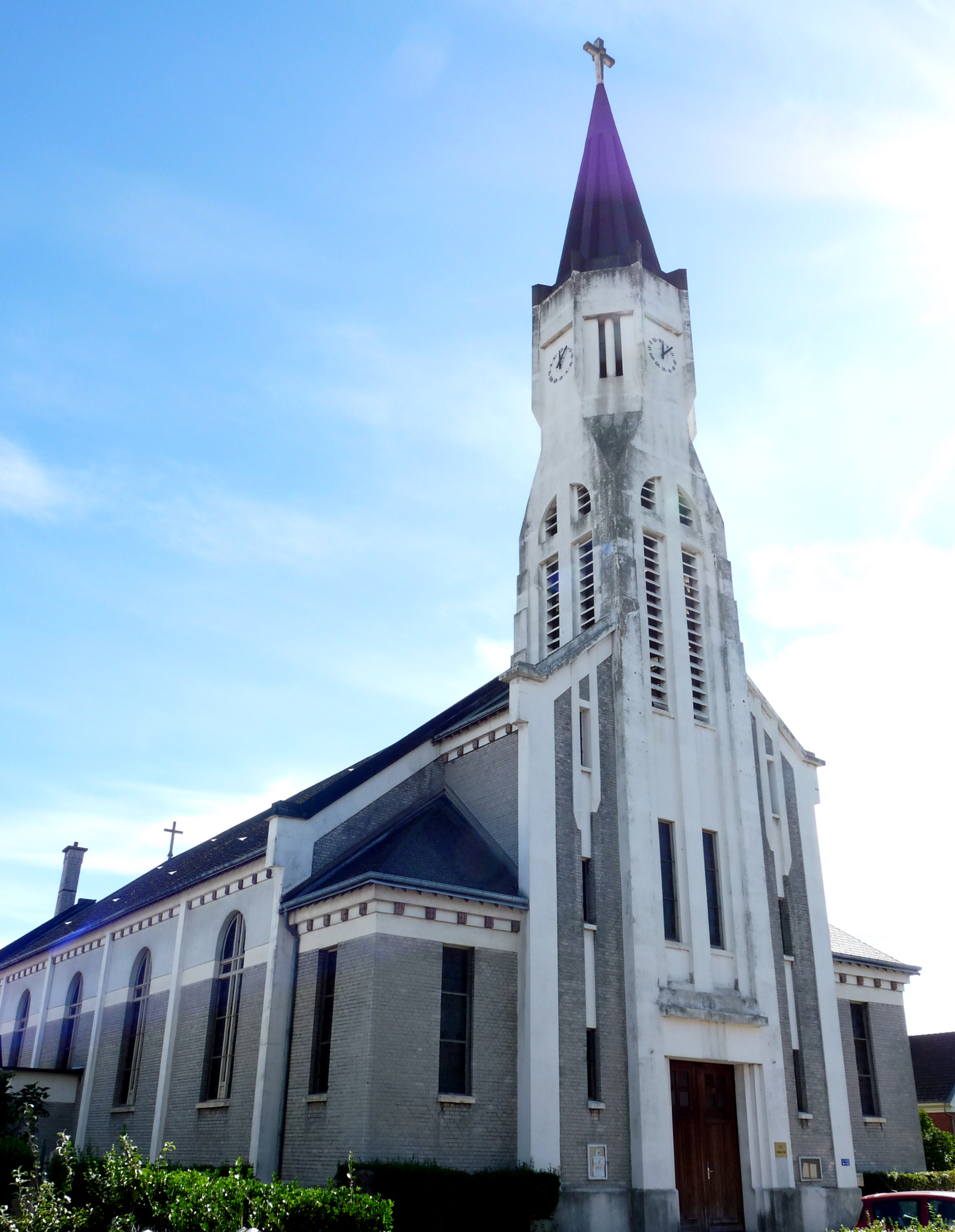
- The church in Sotteville-lès-Rouen

- Coat of arms
- Location of Sotteville-lès-Rouen
- Location within France Location within Normandy
- Coordinates: 49°24′33″N 1°05′24″E
- Country: France
- Region: Normandy
- Department: Seine-Maritime
- Arrondissement: Rouen
- Canton: Le Petit-Quevilly, Sotteville-lès-Rouen
- Intercommunality: Métropole Rouen Normandie

Government
  - Mayor (2026–32): Alexis Ragache
- Area^{1}: 7.44 km^{2} (2.87 sq mi)
- Population (2023): 29,003
  - Density: 3,900/km^{2} (10,100/sq mi)
- Time zone: UTC+01:00 (CET)
  - Summer (DST): UTC+02:00 (CEST)
- INSEE/Postal code: 76681 /
- Website: www.sotteville-les-rouen.fr
- ^{1} French Land Register data, which excludes lakes, ponds, glaciers > 1 km^{2} (0.386 sq mi or 247 acres) and river estuaries.

Sotteville-lès-Rouen (French pronunciation: [sɔtvil lɛ ʁwɑ̃], literally Sotteville near Rouen) is a commune and railway town in the Seine-Maritime department in the Normandy region in northern France.

== Geography ==
It is the largest suburb of the city of Rouen and adjacent to it, some 2 miles (3.2 km) south of the centre of Rouen at the junction of the D94 and the D18 roads.

== Heraldry ==
Arms of Sotteville-lès-Rouen	The arms of Sotteville-lès-Rouen are blazoned : Per bend 1: Azure, a beehive within 7 bees in orle Or; 2: Vert, a Buddicom locomotive Or; a bend gules fimbriated argent, and on a chief gules, a leopard Or armed and langued azure.

== Transportation ==
The métro connects the commune with Rouen and Saint-Étienne-du-Rouvray.

The commune used to be a railway town in the days of the old Rouen tramway.

== Population ==
Historical population

Year	Pop.	±% p.a.
1793	3,000	—
1800	1,806	−6.99%
1806	3,107	+9.46%
1821	3,710	+1.19%
1831	3,912	+0.53%
1836	3,926	+0.07%
1841	3,971	+0.23%
1846	3,993	+0.11%
1851	4,960	+4.43%
1856	8,851	+12.28%
1861	8,890	+0.09%
1866	10,630	+3.64%
1872	10,592	−0.06%
1876	11,763	+2.66%
1881	13,092	+2.16%
1886	15,304	+3.17%
1891	16,384	+1.37%
1896	17,192	+0.97%
1901	18,535	+1.52%

Year	Pop.	±% p.a.
1906	19,042	+0.54%
1911	21,026	+2.00%
1921	22,614	+0.73%
1926	23,364	+0.65%
1931	24,854	+1.24%
1936	26,657	+1.41%
1946	18,469	−3.60%
1954	25,625	+4.18%
1962	33,443	+3.38%
1968	34,495	+0.52%
1975	31,659	−1.22%
1982	30,558	−0.50%
1990	29,544	−0.42%
1999	29,553	+0.00%
2007	30,392	+0.35%
2012	28,622	−1.19%
2017	28,965	+0.24%
2023	29,003	+0.02%

Source: EHESS and INSEE (1968-2023)

== Places of interest ==
- The three churches of Notre-Dame, St. Vincent and Notre-Dame, all dating from the twentieth century.

== People ==
- René Alix (1907–1966), choral conductor and composer
- Jacques Anquetil (1934–1987), racing cyclist, started his career here with AC Sotteville.
- Anny Duperey (1947-), actress, lives here.
- Louis Pierre Vieillot (1748–1830), ornithologist, died in Sotteville-lès-Rouen

== See also ==
- Communes of the Seine-Maritime department

== Bibliography ==
- L. Leroy, D. Andrieu et J.-F. Glabik, Sotteville, une vie, éd. Maison pour Tous, 1989 ; 1991 ISBN 2-909094-00-6
- Guy Pessiot, Histoire de l'agglomération rouennaise : la rive gauche, éd. du P'tit Normand, 1990 ISBN 978-2-906258-22-8
