= Arrondissements of the Seine-Maritime department =

Administrative divisions of France

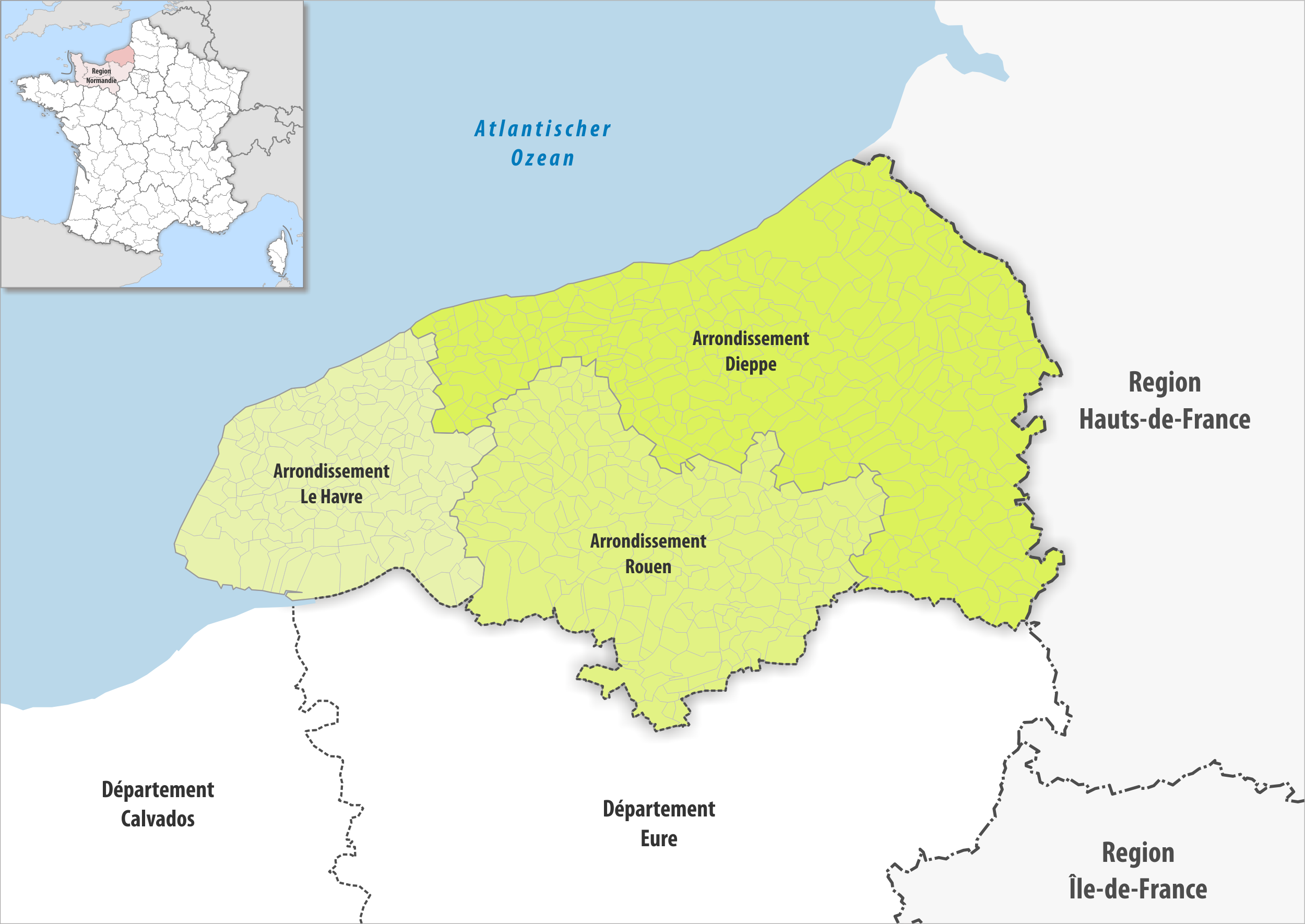
Map of arrondissements of the Seine-Maritime department.

The 3 arrondissements of the Seine-Maritime department are:

1. Arrondissement of Dieppe, (subprefecture: Dieppe) with 343 communes. The population of the arrondissement was 232,559 in 2021.
2. Arrondissement of Le Havre, (subprefecture: Le Havre) with 149 communes. The population of the arrondissement was 383,996 in 2021.
3. Arrondissement of Rouen, (prefecture of the Seine-Maritime department: Rouen) with 216 communes. The population of the arrondissement was 639,363 in 2021.

== History ==
In 1800, the arrondissements of Rouen, Dieppe, Le Havre, Neufchâtel and Yvetot were established. The arrondissements of Neufchâtel and Yvetot were disbanded in 1926.

The borders of the arrondissements of Seine-Maritime were modified in January 2017:

- four communes from the arrondissement of Dieppe to the arrondissement of Rouen
- 12 communes from the arrondissement of Le Havre to the arrondissement of Dieppe
- seven communes from the arrondissement of Le Havre to the arrondissement of Rouen
- four communes from the arrondissement of Rouen to the arrondissement of Dieppe
