= Agglomeration community of Rouen =

Rouen
- Former communauté d'agglomération
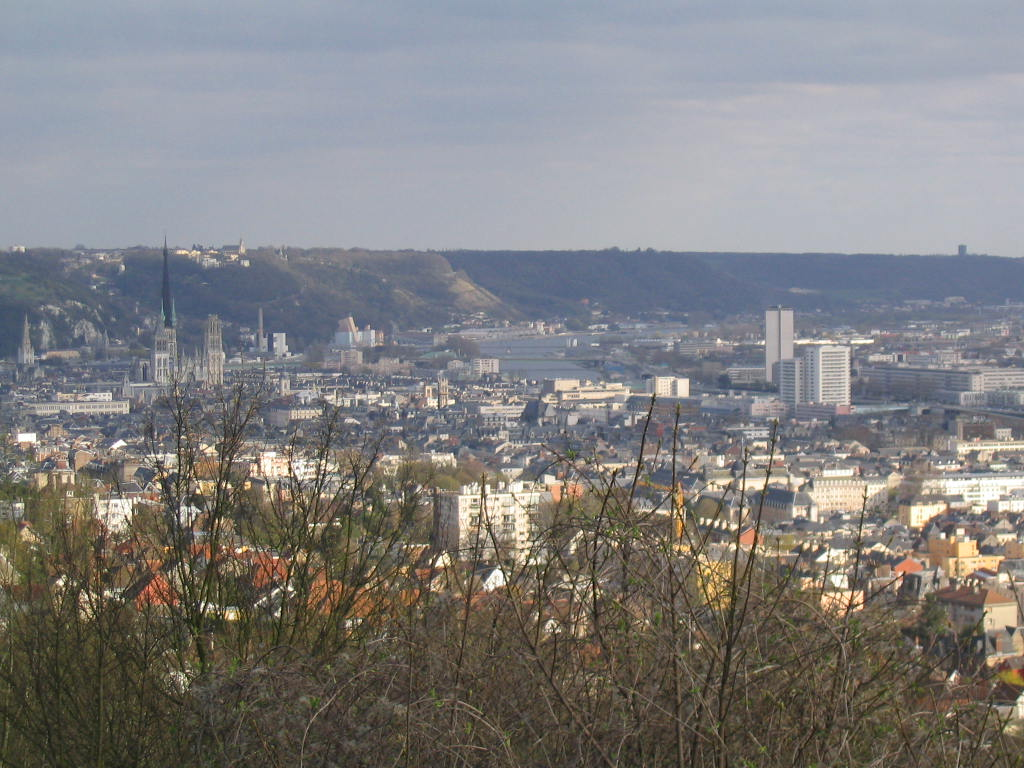
- Country: France
- Region: Normandy
- Department: Seine-Maritime
- No. of communes: {{{nbcomm}}}
- Established: 2000
- Disbanded: 2010
- Area: 448 km^{2} (173 sq mi)
- Population (2007): 411,435
  - Density: 918/km^{2} (2,380/sq mi)

The Agglomeration community of Rouen is a former intercommunality located in the Seine-Maritime département in the Normandy region of northern France. It was created in January 2000. With three other intercommunalities it formed the Agglomeration community of Rouen-Elbeuf-Austreberthe in 2010, which was replaced by the Métropole Rouen Normandie in 2015.

== Participants ==
The Agglomeration community was composed of the following 45 communes:

- Amfreville-la-Mi-Voie
- Les Authieux-sur-le-Port-Saint-Ouen
- Belbeuf
- Bihorel
- Bois-Guillaume
- Bonsecours
- Boos
- La Bouille
- Canteleu
- Darnétal
- Déville-lès-Rouen
- Fontaine-sous-Préaux
- Franqueville-Saint-Pierre
- Gouy
- Grand-Couronne
- Le Grand-Quevilly
- Hautot-sur-Seine
- Le Houlme
- Houppeville
- Isneauville
- Malaunay
- Maromme
- Le Mesnil-Esnard
- Montmain
- Mont-Saint-Aignan
- Moulineaux
- La Neuville-Chant-d'Oisel
- Notre-Dame-de-Bondeville
- Oissel
- Petit-Couronne
- Petit-Quevilly
- Préaux
- Quévreville-la-Poterie
- Roncherolles-sur-le-Vivier
- Rouen
- Sahurs
- Saint-Aubin-Celloville
- Saint-Aubin-Épinay
- Saint-Étienne-du-Rouvray
- Saint-Jacques-sur-Darnétal
- Saint-Léger-du-Bourg-Denis
- Saint-Martin-du-Vivier
- Saint-Pierre-de-Manneville
- Sotteville-lès-Rouen
- Val-de-la-Haye
- Ymare

== See also ==
- Communes of the Seine-Maritime department
