= Canton of Grand-Couronne =

Coordinates: 49°21′57″N 0°58′24″E

Grand-Couronne
- Former canton
- Interactive map of Grand-Couronne
- Country: France
- Region: Normandy
- Department: Seine-Maritime
- No. of communes: {{{nbcomm}}}
- Disbanded: 2015
- Area: 79.34 km^{2} (30.63 sq mi)
- Population (2012): 29,521
  - Density: 372.1/km^{2} (963.7/sq mi)

The Canton of Grand-Couronne is a former canton situated in the Seine-Maritime département and in the Haute-Normandie region of northern France. It was disbanded following the French canton reorganisation which came into effect in March 2015. It had a total of 29,521 inhabitants (2012).

== Geography ==
An area of forestry and light industry situated on the left bank of the Seine, immediately south of Rouen in the arrondissement of Rouen, centred on the town of Grand-Couronne. The altitude varies from 1m (Le Grand-Quevilly) to 139m (Grand-Couronne) with an average altitude of 18m.

The canton comprised 9 communes:

- La Bouille
- Grand-Couronne
- Le Grand-Quevilly (partly)
- Hautot-sur-Seine
- Moulineaux
- Petit-Couronne
- Sahurs
- Saint-Pierre-de-Manneville
- Val-de-la-Haye

== See also ==
- Arrondissements of the Seine-Maritime department
- Cantons of the Seine-Maritime department
- Communes of the Seine-Maritime department
