= Canton of Maromme =

Coordinates: 49°27′59″N 1°02′21″E

Maromme
- Former canton
- Interactive map of Maromme
- Country: France
- Region: Normandy
- Department: Seine-Maritime
- No. of communes: {{{nbcomm}}}
- Disbanded: 2015
- Area: 21.62 km^{2} (8.35 sq mi)
- Population (2012): 26,013
  - Density: 1,203/km^{2} (3,116/sq mi)

The Canton of Maromme is a former canton situated in the Seine-Maritime département and in the Haute-Normandie region of northern France. It was disbanded following the French canton reorganisation which came into effect in March 2015. It consisted of 2 communes, which joined the canton of Canteleu in 2015. It had a total of 26,013 inhabitants (2012).

== Geography ==
An area of light industry, forestry and farming situated on the banks of the Seine, immediately west of Rouen in the arrondissement of Rouen. The altitude varies from 2m (Canteleu) to 138m (Canteleu) with an average altitude of 107m.

The canton comprised 2 communes:

- Canteleu
- Maromme

== Population ==
Historical population Canton of Maromme
| Year | 1962 | 1968 | 1975 | 1982 | 1990 | 1999 |
| Pop. | 18,260 | 23,522 | 25,796 | 27,707 | 28,834 | 27,841 |
| ±% | — | +28.8% | +9.7% | +7.4% | +4.1% | −3.4% |
From the year 1962 on: No double counting – residents of multiple communes (e.g. students and military personnel) are counted only once. Source: INSEE

== See also ==
- Arrondissements of the Seine-Maritime department
- Cantons of the Seine-Maritime department
- Communes of the Seine-Maritime department
