= Canton of Canteleu =

Coordinates: 49.45°N 1.03°E

Canteleu
- Canton for the Departmental Council of Seine-Maritime
- Situation of the canton of Canteleu in the department
- Department: Seine-Maritime
- Population: 28,629 (2022)
- Electorate: 16,886 (2024)
- Major settlements: Canteleu; Maromme

Current Canton
- Created: 2015
- Members: David Lamiray (PS); Brigitte Manzanarès (PS)
- Seats: Two
- Former cantons: Maromme; Grand-Couronne

The canton of Canteleu is an electoral district of the Seine-Maritime department, in northern France. It elects two departmental councillors sitting in the Departmental Council of Seine-Maritime. It was created at the French canton reorganisation which came into effect in March 2015. Its seat is in Canteleu.

It consists of the following communes:

1. Canteleu
2. Hautot-sur-Seine
3. Maromme
4. Sahurs
5. Saint-Pierre-de-Manneville
6. Val-de-la-Haye

== Departmental counselors ==
Election	Member	Party	Elected offices
2015	David Lamiray	PS	Mayor of Maromme; Incumbent councillor of the canton of Maromme since 2004
2015	Brigitte Manzanares	PS	Deputy mayor of Saint-Pierre-de-Manneville until 2020
2021	David Lamiray	PS	Mayor of Maromme; Incumbent departmental councillor
2021	Brigitte Manzanares	PS	Incumbent departmental councillor

== Election results ==
=== 2021 ===
Pairs	Party	Nuance	First round		Second round	
Pairs	Party	Nuance	Votes	%	Votes	%
David Lamiray	PS	SOC	2,707	52.34	3,742	73.44
Brigitte Manzanares	PS	SOC	2,707	52.34	3,742	73.44
Salomée Tessier	RN	RN	1,082	20.92	1,353	26.56
Anthony Vanhese	RN	RN	1,082	20.92	1,353	26.56
Brigitte Montier	PCF	COM	730	14.11		
Guy Wurcker	PCF	COM	730	14.11		
Corinne Goudemare	LR	UCD	653	12.63		
Laurent Thiebaut	LR	UCD	653	12.63		
Votes			5,172	100.00	5,095	100.00
Valid votes			5,172	94.95	5,095	92.03
Blank votes			159	2.92	267	4.82
Null votes			116	2.13	174	3.14
Turnout			5,447	30.98	5,536	31.48
Abstentions			12,134	69.02	12,049	68.52
Registered voters			17,581		17,585	
Result			PS HOLD			
Result			PS HOLD			

=== 2015 ===
Pairs	Party	Nuance	First round		Second round	
Pairs	Party	Nuance	Votes	%	Votes	%
David Lamiray	PS	SOC	3,620	42.38	5,135	64.45
Brigitte Manzanares	PS	SOC	3,620	42.38	5,135	64.45
Julien Odièvre	FN	FN	2,384	27.91	2,882	35.55
Véronique Quenneville	FN	FN	2,384	27.91	2,882	35.55
Karim Hadef	UMP	UD	1,252	14.66		
Carline Lefebvre	UMP	UD	1,252	14.66		
Marie Caron	EÉLV	DVG	1,096	12.83		
Boris Lecœur	FG	DVG	1,096	12.83		
Valérie Lecomte	DVD	DVD	189	2.21		
Tony Peulevé	DVD	DVD	189	2.21		
Votes			8,541	100.00	7,967	100.00
Valid votes			8,541	95.78	7,967	90.64
Blank votes			288	3.23	635	7.22
Null votes			88	0.99	188	2.14
Turnout			8,917	47.93	8,790	47.25
Abstentions			9,687	52.07	9,814	52.75
Registered voters			18,604		18,604	
Result			PS WIN (new seat)			
Result			PS WIN (new seat)			
