= Saint-Martin-du-Vivier station =

Railway station in Saint-Martin-du-Vivier, France

Gare de Saint-Martin-du-Vivier
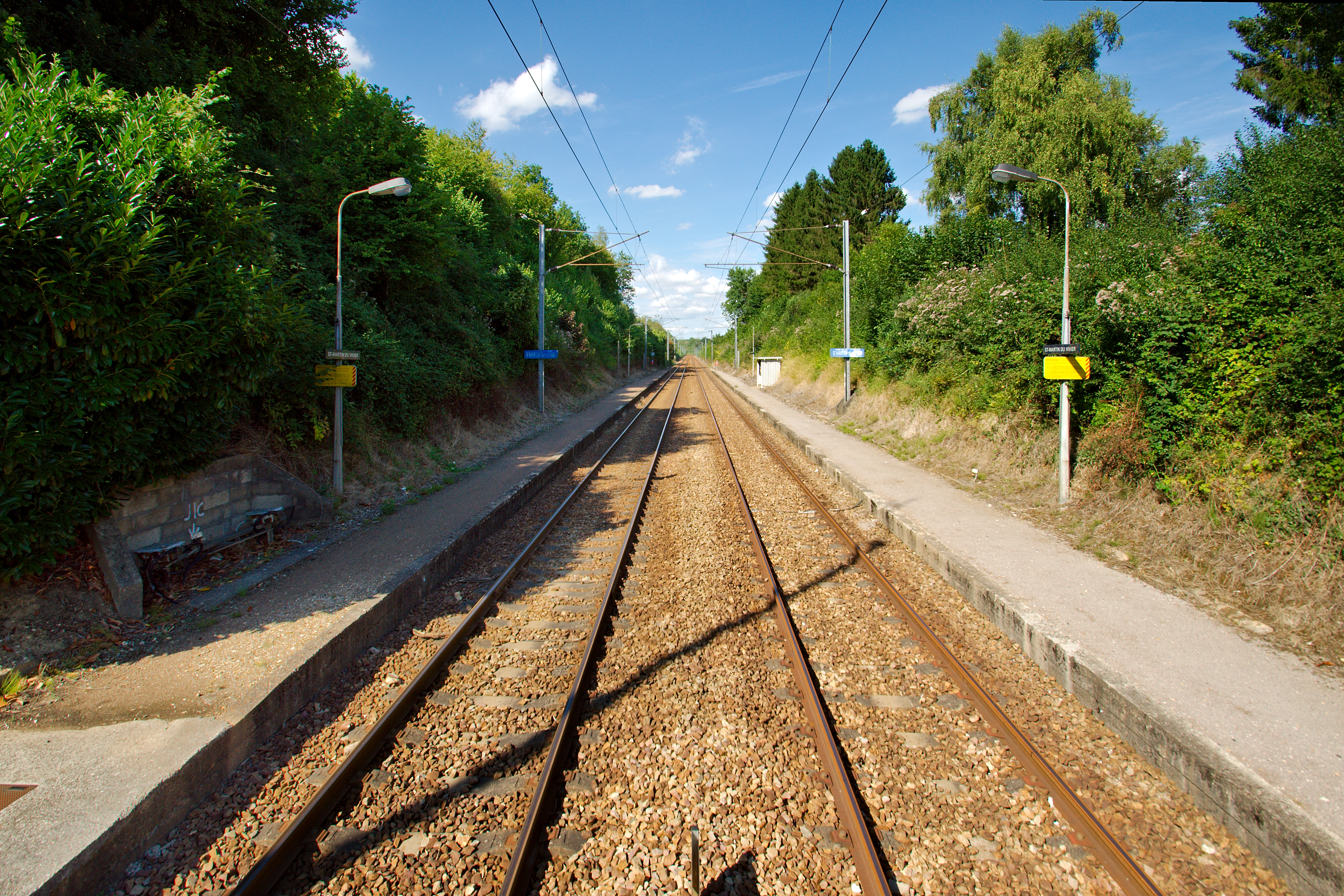

General information
- Location: Saint-Martin-du-Vivier
- Coordinates: 49°28′15″N 1°9′42″E
- Owner: RFF/SNCF
- Line: Amiens–Rouen railway
- Platforms: 2
- Tracks: 2

Other information
- Station code: 87411413

History
- Closed: 25 August 2019
Location

The Gare de Saint-Martin-du-Vivier (Saint-Martin-du-Vivier station) is a railway station located in the commune of Saint-Martin-du-Vivier in the Seine-Maritime department, France. It was served by TER Normandie and TER Hauts-de-France trains from Amiens to Rouen until summer 2019.
