= Robec =

River in France

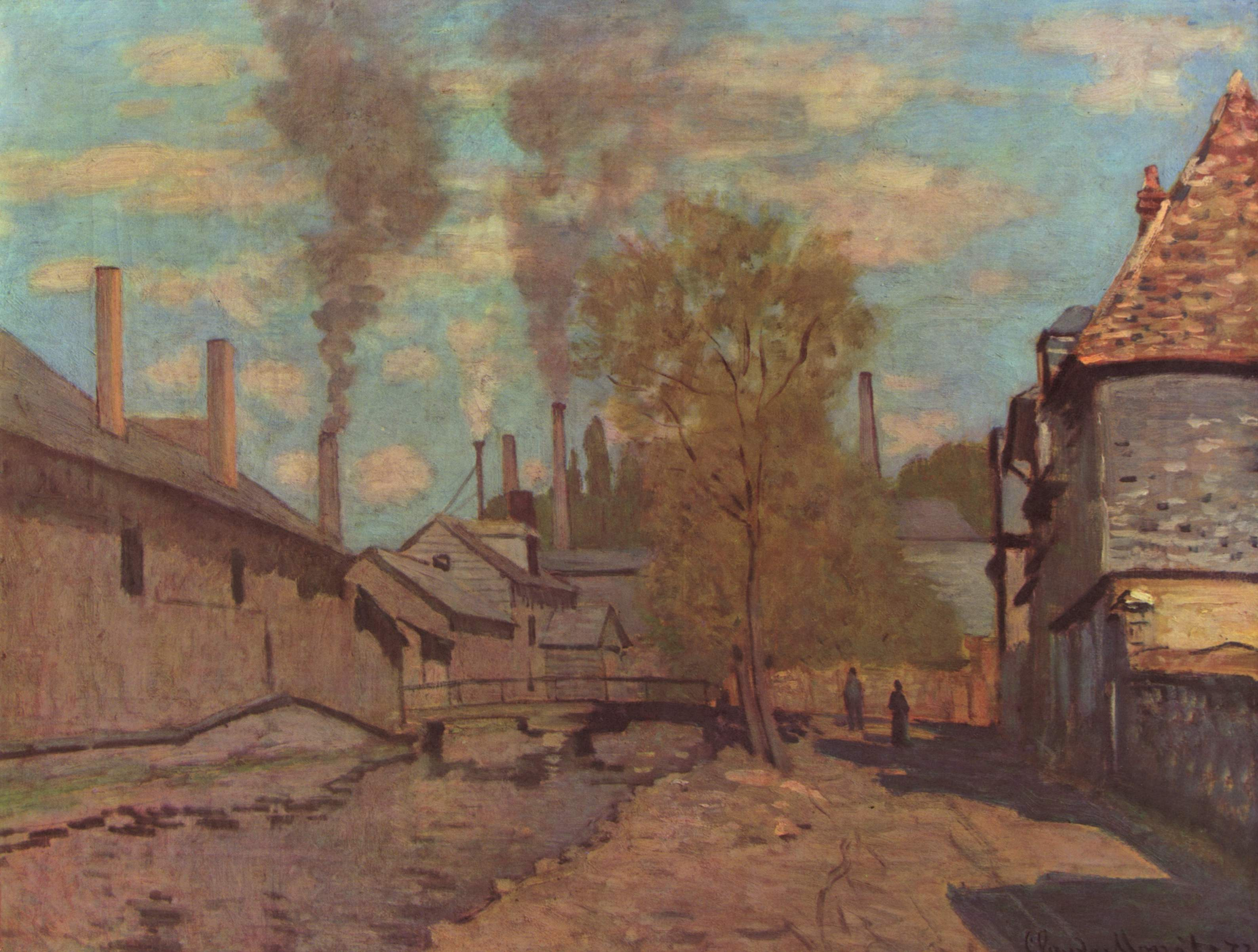
- The Robec, by Claude Monet, 1872

- Location within France Location within Normandy

Location
- Country: Lower Normandy

Physical characteristics
- Mouth
  - location: Aubette
  - coordinates: 49.4380°N 1.1064°E
- Length: 8.9 km (5.5 mi)

Basin features
- Progression: Aubette→ Seine→ English Channel

The Robec (Old Norse raudh, red and bekkr, stream) is a small river in Seine-Maritime, Normandy, France. Its length is 8.9 km. The river begins near Fontaine-sous-Préaux, then it flows through Darnétal and ends in the Aubette in Rouen.

In order to avoid a repetition of the floods that have affected the valleys of the Cailly, the Robec and the Aubette, a schéma d'aménagement et de gestion des eaux (water resource management scheme) is under consideration.
