= Château de Robert le Diable =

Feudal castle in Seine-Maritime, France

- Moulineaux, France
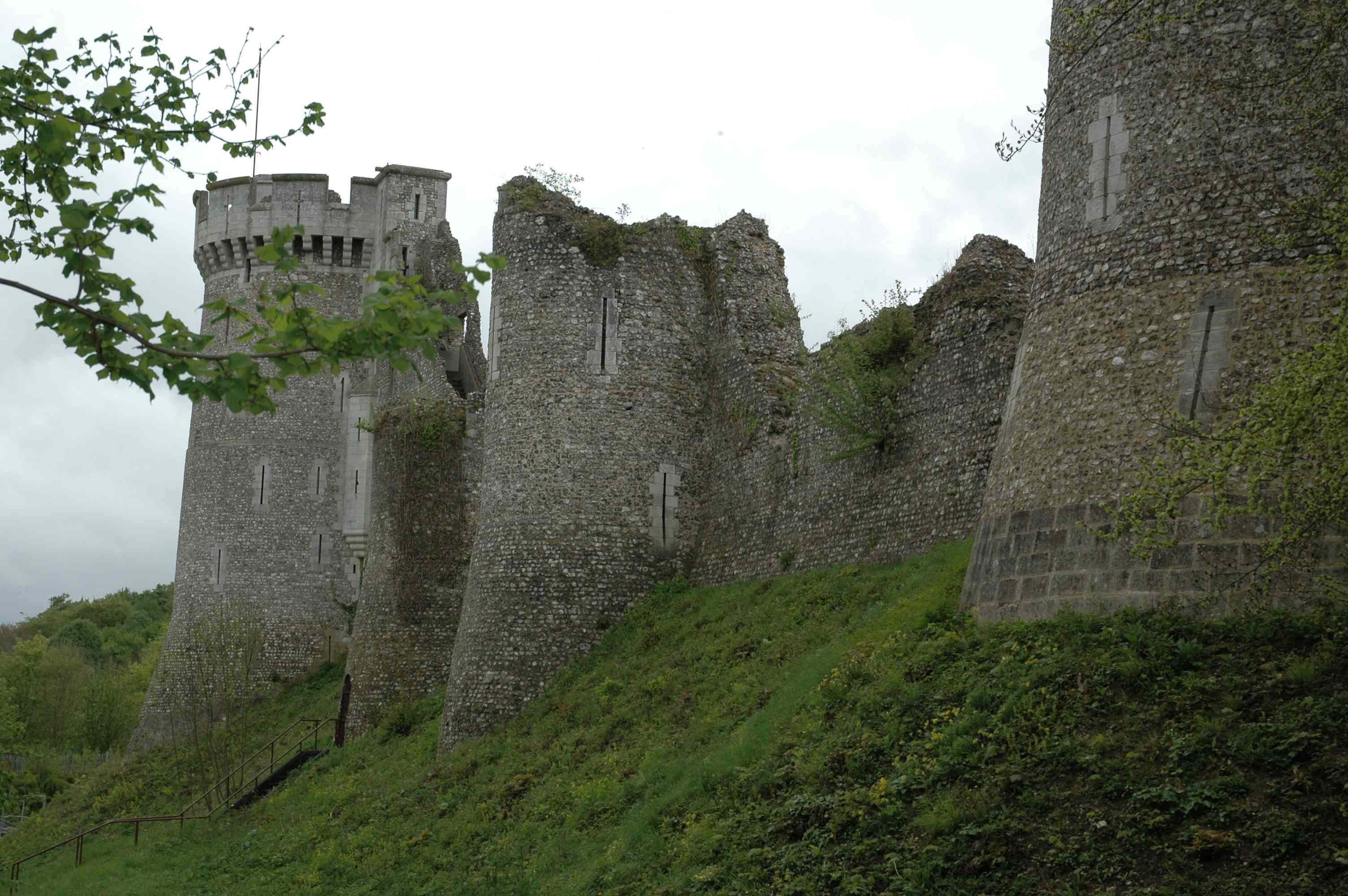
- View of Château de Robert le Diable

Site information
- Type: Concentric castle
- Condition: Ruins

Location
- Coordinates: 49.3396°N 0.9597°E

Site history
- Built: c.
- Materials: Limestone

Garrison information
- Occupants: Duchy of Normandy

The Château de Robert le Diable is a French feudal castle from the time of the Dukes of Normandy. It is more properly, though less commonly, known as the Château de Moulineaux. It is situated at Moulineaux near Rouen, in the département of Seine Maritime at the side of the A13 autoroute.

It takes its name from Robert the Devil who, according to some, was Robert I, Duke of Normandy, the father of William the Conqueror. However, there is no evidence that this person was involved in the construction.

The castle was built during the 11th and 12th centuries. It stands on a hill which dominates the River Seine, the view extending over the whole Rouen region, making it a particularly strategic location.

It is known that the English King Richard I ('Lionheart') stayed here. His brother, King John ('Lackland') destroyed the castle during his struggle with the King of France Philip II Augustus. The latter rebuilt it. During the Hundred Years' War, the people of Rouen destroyed the towers to prevent the castle being used by the English.

Half ruined, it is today furnished with various artefacts as well as reconstructed scenes of local history and life in the Middle Ages.

The castle is owned by the Agglomeration community of Rouen. The site has been classified since 1935 as a monument historique by the French Ministry of Culture.

== See also ==
- List of castles in France
