= Robert the Devil =

Medieval French legendary figure

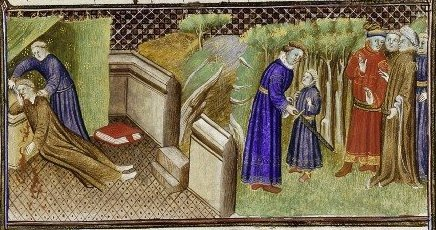
Robert commits one of his crimes (left) and is knighted (right); 15th-century illustration from the Chronique de Normandie

Robert the Devil (Latin: Robertus Diabolus) is a legend of medieval origin about a Norman knight who discovers he is the son of Satan. His mother, despairing of heaven's aid in order to obtain a son, had asked for help from the devil. Robert's satanic instincts propel him into a violent and sinful life, but he eventually overcomes them to achieve repentance.

The story originated in France in the 13th century and has since provided the basis for many literary and dramatic works, most notably the Meyerbeer opera Robert le diable.

== Literature and legend ==
=== Story ===
The 19th-century Italian writer Arturo Graf gives this version of the legend in his 1889 book Il Diavolo:

There was once a duchess of Normandy who was tormented with a desire to have children and yet could have none. Weary of recommending herself to God, who will not listen to her, she betakes herself to the Devil, and her wish is speedily satisfied. A son is born to her, a veritable firebrand. As an infant, he bites his nurse and tears out her hair; as a lad, he knifes his teachers; at the age of twenty, he becomes a bandit chief. He is dubbed knight, in the belief that thus the wicked instincts raging within him may be overcome; but thereafter he is worse than he was before. No one surpasses him in strength or in courage. In a tourney he overthrows and slays thirty opponents; then he goes roaming about the world; then he returns to his native land, and begins once more to play the bandit, robbing, burning, murdering, ravishing. One day, after cutting the throats of all the nuns of a certain abbey, he remembers his mother and goes in search of her. Soon as they spy him, the servants take to their heels, scattering in all directions; not one tarries to ask him whence he comes or what he desires. Then, for the first time in his life, Robert is astounded at the horror which he inspires in his fellow-beings; for the first time, he becomes conscious of his own monstrous wickedness, and he feels how his heart is pierced by the sharp tooth of remorse. But why is he wickeder than other men? Why was he born thus? Who made him what he is? An ardent longing seizes him to unravel this mystery. He hastens to his mother, and with drawn sword he adjures her to unveil to him the secret of his birth. Learning this, he becomes frantic with terror, shame, and grief. But his sturdy nature is not weakened; he does not yield to despair; instead, the hope of a laborious redemption, of a marvelous victory, urges and spurs on his proud spirit. He will learn to conquer Hell, to subdue himself, to thwart the designs of that accursed fiend who created him to serve his own ends, who has made of him a docile instrument of destruction and of sin. And he makes no delay. He goes to Rome, casts himself at the feet of the pope, makes confession to a holy hermit, submits himself to the harshest kind of penance, and swears that henceforth he will taste no food that he has not first wrested from the jaws of a dog. On two separate occasions, when Rome was besieged by the Saracens, he fights incognito for the Emperor and gains the victory for the Christians. Recognized at last, he refuses all rewards and honors, the imperial crown, even the monarch's own daughter, goes away to dwell with his hermit in the wilderness, and dies a saint, blessed by both God and men. In other accounts, he finally weds the beautiful princess who is deeply in love with him.

=== Literary history ===
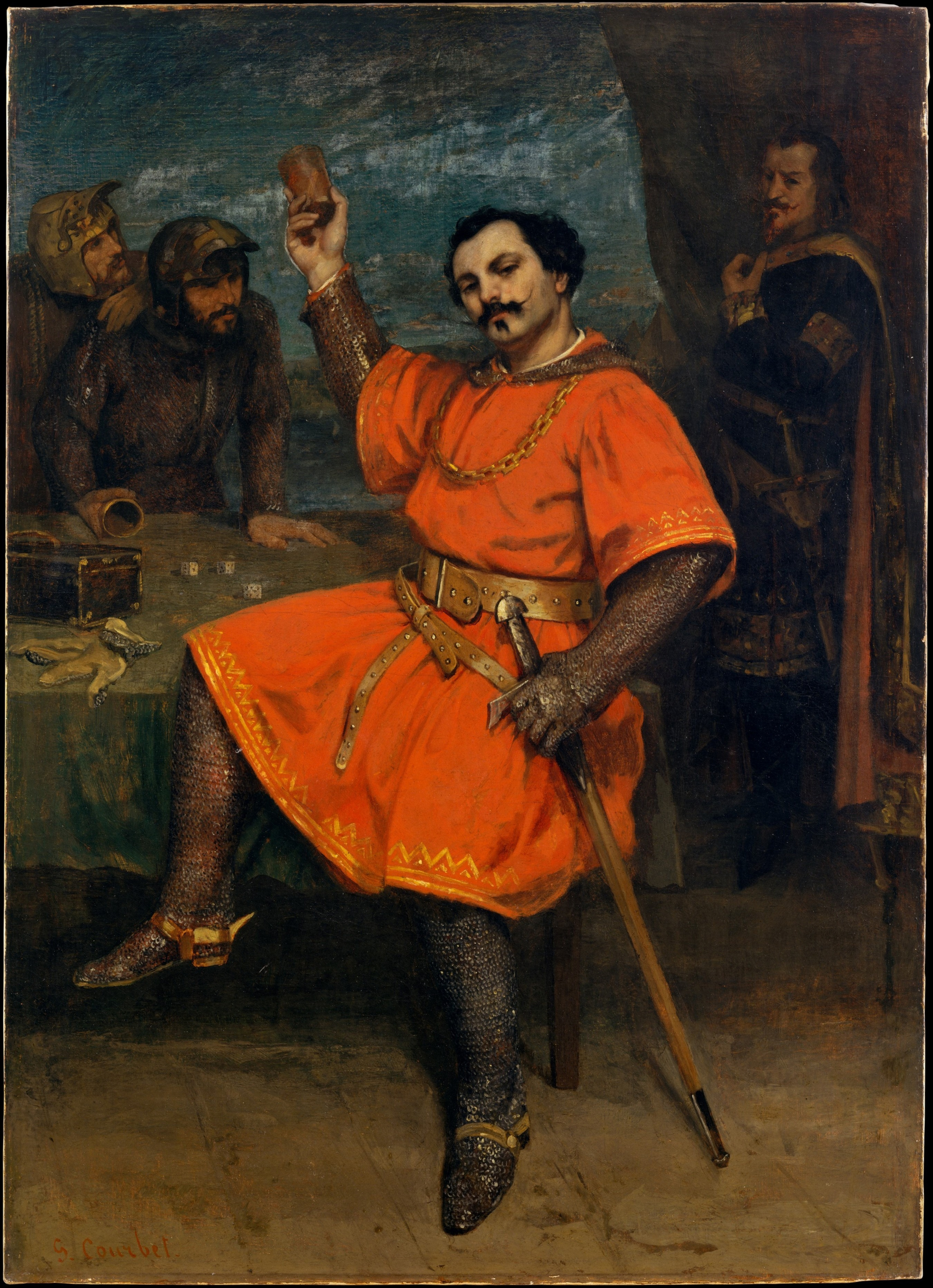
Louis Guéymard in the Meyerbeer opera

The oldest known account of this legend is a Latin prose narrative by a Dominican friar, Etienne de Bourbon (c. 1250), in which no information on Robert's family is given. Then it appears in a French metrical romance of the 13th century, in which Robert is described as the son of the duchess of Normandy. An English translation by Samuel N. Rosenberg of the 13th-century French romance was published in 2018 by Penn State University Press. It appears also in a "dit" of somewhat later date, and in a miracle play of the 14th century. A French prose version was also prefixed to the old Croniques de Normandie (probably of the 13th century). But the legend owes its popularity to the story-books, of which the earliest known appeared at Lyons in 1496, and again at Paris in 1497, under the title La Vie du terrible Robert le dyable. Since the 16th century the legend was often printed together with that of Richard sans Peur (Richard I, Duke of Normandy); it was published in completely recast form in 1769 under the title Histoire de Robert le Diable, duc de Normandie, et de Richard Sans Peur, son fils.

From France the legend spread to Spain, where it was very popular. In England, the subject was treated in the metrical romance Sir Gowther, probably written around the end of the 14th century (though in this version the devil disguises himself as the mother's husband). An English translation from the French chapbook was made by Wynkyn de Worde, Caxton's assistant, and published without date under the title Robert deuyll. Another version, not based on the preceding, was written by Thomas Lodge in his book on Robin the Divell, in which Robert is the "second Duke of Normandy" (London, 1591). In the Netherlands, the romance of Robrecht den Duyvel was put on the index of forbidden books by the Bishop of Antwerp in 1621.

In Germany, the legend never attained much of a vogue; not until the 19th century did it pass into the Volksbücher, being introduced by Görres. It was treated in epic form by Victor von Strauß (1854), in dramatic form by Raupach (1835) and in comic travesty (after the 1831 Meyerbeer opera Robert le diable) by W. S. Gilbert in 1868.

The villain in Erich Kästner's 1931 children's story Pünktchen und Anton, a petty criminal and thief, is rather facetiously nicknamed "Robert the Devil".

== Historicity ==
Various attempts have been made to identify Robert with a historical person, generally a Norman aristocrat of the 11th century. F. J. Furnivall, following earlier writers, argued that Robert I, Duke of Normandy was the source of the story, writing that, "The original of Robert the Devil was Robert, father of William the Conqueror, and sixth Duke of Normandy. Part of the legends about him have been transferred to a different person, Robert, King of Sicily (and of Jerusalem), Duke of Apulia etc., who tried to make peace between Edward III and the French king, and whom Froissart and others tell us of."

Other scholars have dismissed this. Charles Homer Haskins says that it is nothing more than "an unwarranted confusion with this hero, or rather villain, of romance and grand opera". Another Norman aristocrat, Robert of Bellême, has also been suggested as the original. According to William Hunt in the Dictionary of National Biography, various stories of his sadistic cruelty were circulated after his death. In Maine, "his abiding works are pointed to as the works of Robert the Devil, a surname that has been transferred from him to the father of the Conqueror."

A Norman castle near Rouen, known as Château de Robert le Diable, is associated with the legend. The Elizabethan statesman Robert Cecil was called "Robert the devil" by his enemies, but this was with reference to the existing legend.

== Folkloristic analysis ==
Scholars (e.g., Eilert Løseth, Ernst Tegethoff, Laura Hibbard Loomis, Jack Zipes, Waldemar Liungman, Maxime Chevalier (es), Francisco Vaz da Silva) have noted similarities between the medieval tale of Robert le Diable and two folktales classified in the international Aarne-Thompson-Uther Index as types ATU 314, "Goldener", and ATU 502, "The Wild Man as Helper", in their common second part: the hero leaves home and goes to work in a lowly position in another kingdom (usually, as a gardener); later, he rides into battle to save the kingdom from a foreign enemy, and is injured during a battle; his wound or bandaged injury is used to identify him.

== See also ==
- Don Juan
- Mordred
- The Devil's Advocate
