= Gouy Cave =

Coordinates: 49.3602°N 1.1301°E

- Grotte de Gouy
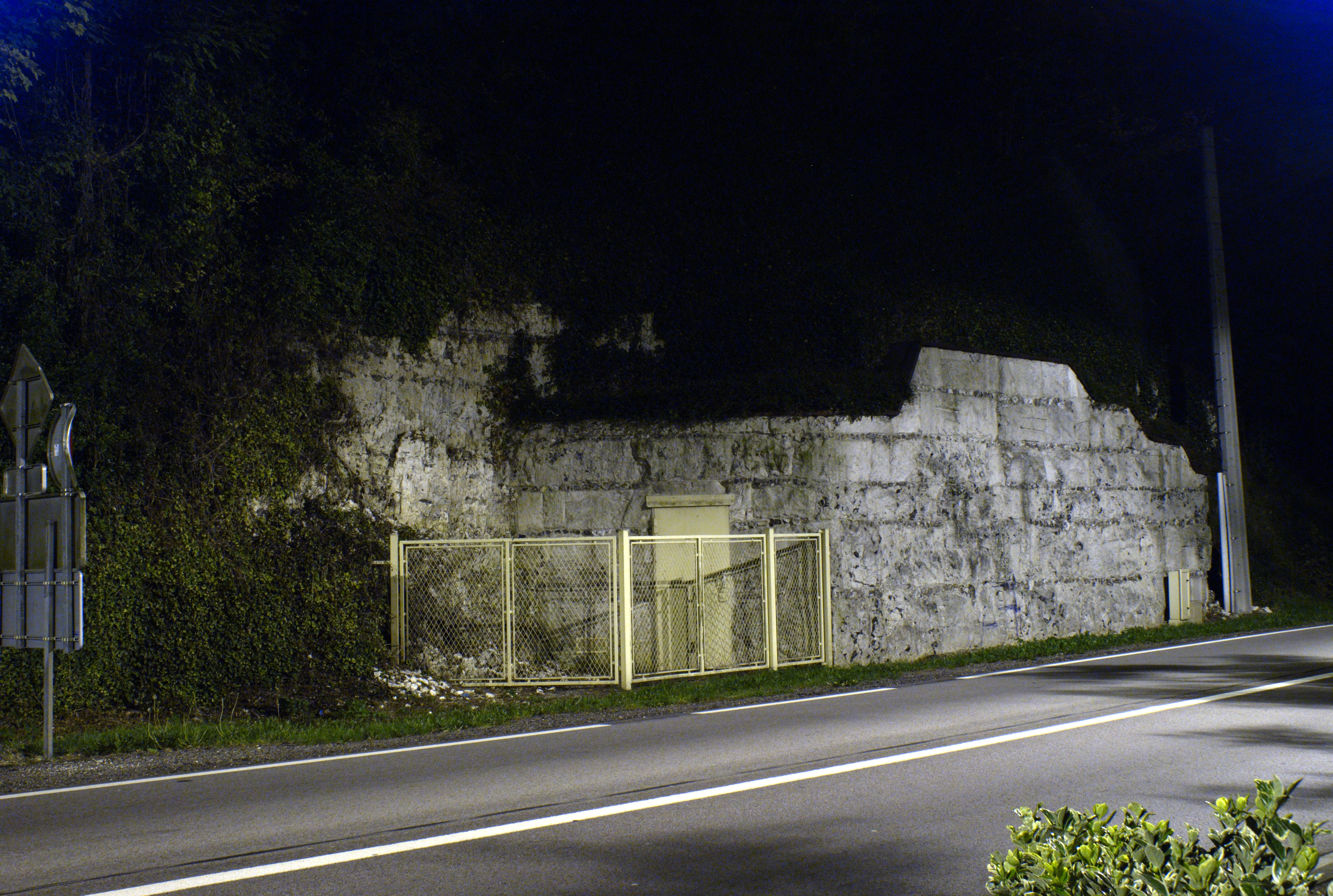
- Entrance to Gouy Cave
- Interactive map of Gouy Cave
- Location: Gouy, France
- Discovery: 1956

Gouy Cave (French: Grotte de Gouy) is a cave with engravings dating to the Paleolithic era in Gouy, France. It has the northernmost paleolithic cave art found in France.

The cave was discovered in 1956 by two boys and inscriptions in the cave indicate that the cave was found but unreported by locals in 1881. Excavations began in 1959. Engravings found in Gouy Cave depict animals, including ox, horses, and deer. In 2010, the Archaeological Institute of America declared the site at risk due to tree roots growing in the cave's limestone walls.
