= Canton of Darnétal =

Coordinates: 49°27′42″N 1°15′19″E

Darnétal
- Canton
- Country: France
- Region: Normandy
- Department: Seine-Maritime
- No. of communes: {{{nbcomm}}}
- Area: 87.29 km^{2} (33.70 sq mi)
- Population (2023): 38,320
  - Density: 439.0/km^{2} (1,137/sq mi)
- INSEE code: 76 06

The Canton of Darnétal is a canton situated in the Seine-Maritime département and in the Normandy region of northern France.

== Geography ==
An area of farmland and forests, with some light industry in the arrondissement of Rouen, centred on the town of Darnétal.

== Composition ==
At the French canton reorganisation which came into effect in March 2015, the canton was reduced from 19 to 15 communes:

- Amfreville-la-Mi-Voie
- Les Authieux-sur-le-Port-Saint-Ouen
- Belbeuf
- Bonsecours
- Darnétal
- Fontaine-sous-Préaux
- Gouy
- Quévreville-la-Poterie
- Roncherolles-sur-le-Vivier
- Saint-Aubin-Celloville
- Saint-Aubin-Épinay
- Saint-Jacques-sur-Darnétal
- Saint-Léger-du-Bourg-Denis
- Saint-Martin-du-Vivier
- Ymare

== Population ==
Historical population
Year	Pop.	±% p.a.
2013	36,638	—
2018	38,063	+0.77%
Source: INSEE

== See also ==
- Arrondissements of the Seine-Maritime department
- Cantons of the Seine-Maritime department
- Communes of the Seine-Maritime department
