= Aubette (Seine-Maritime) =

River in France

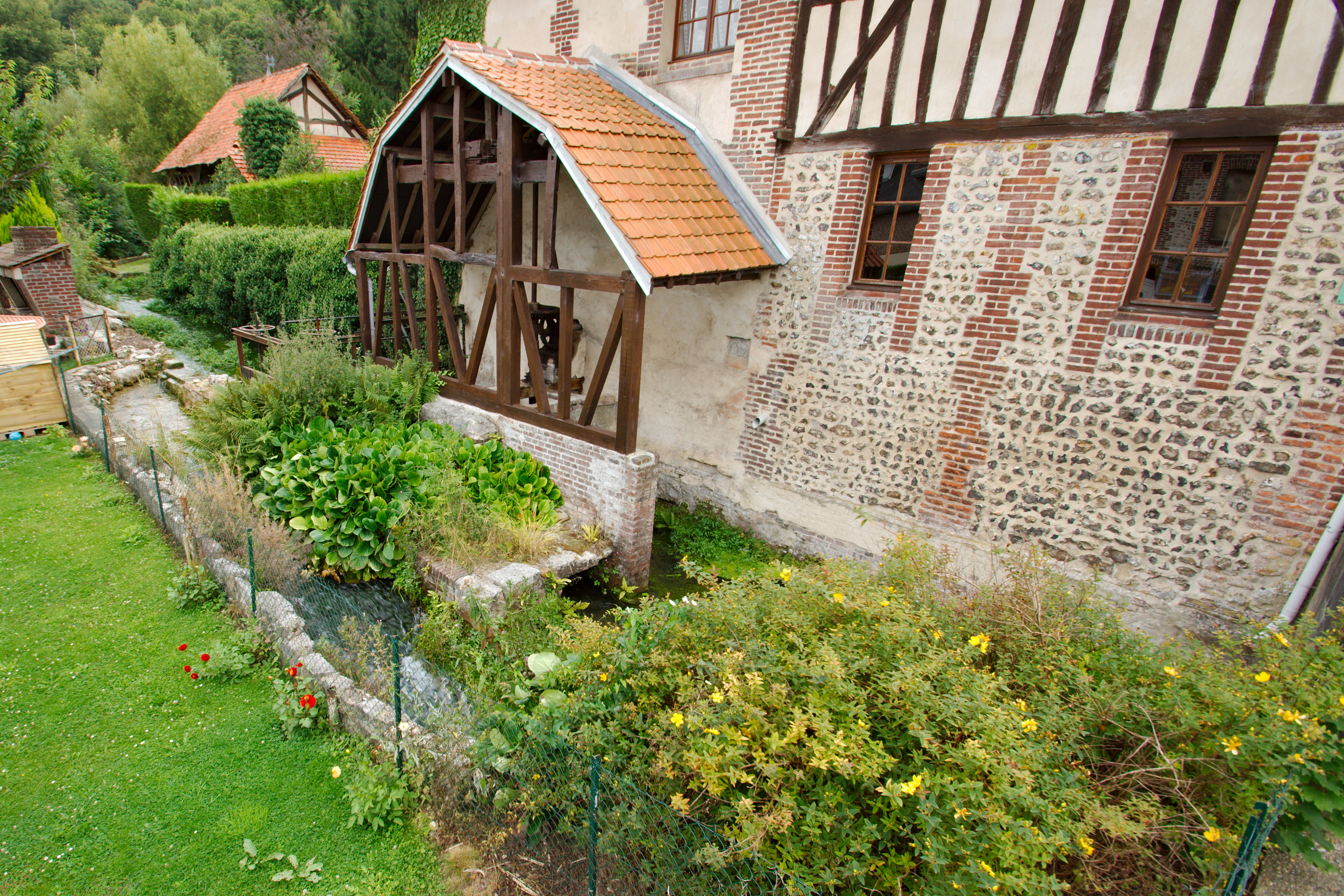

- Location within France Location within Normandy

Location
- Country: France

Physical characteristics
- Mouth: Seine
  - coordinates: 49°26′9″N 1°6′3″E
- Length: 7.9 km (4.9 mi)

Basin features
- Progression: Seine→ English Channel
- Tributaries
  - right: Robec

The Aubette (French pronunciation: [obɛt]) is a small river of Seine-Maritime département. It is 7.9 km (4.9 mi) long. It begins near Saint-Aubin-Épinay, and flows along the town Darnétal. It is joined by the river Robec before it flows into the Seine near Rouen. In the 19th century, the Aubette had a hundred mills, textiles, paper mills, etc. Although the river Robec is longer than the Aubette (9 km) it is considered to be a tributary of Aubette.
