= Saint-Jacques-sur-Darnétal =

- Commune
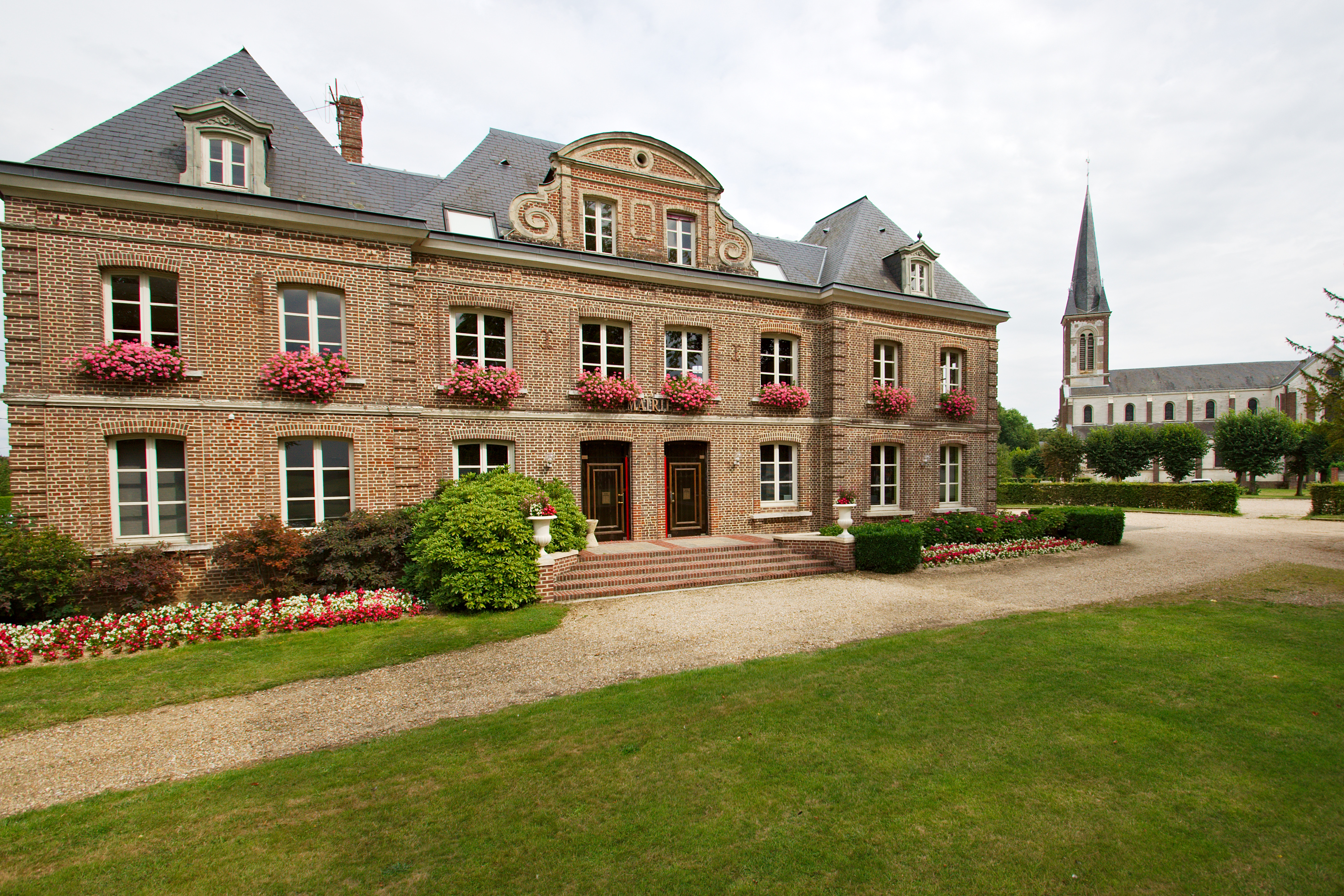
- The town hall and church in Saint-Jacques-sur-Darnétal
- Location of Saint-Jacques-sur-Darnétal
- Location within France Location within Normandy
- Coordinates: 49°26′28″N 1°12′14″E
- Country: France
- Region: Normandy
- Department: Seine-Maritime
- Arrondissement: Rouen
- Canton: Darnétal
- Intercommunality: Métropole Rouen Normandie

Government
  - Mayor (2026–32): Frédéric Delaunay
- Area^{1}: 16.71 km^{2} (6.45 sq mi)
- Elevation: 143 m (469 ft)
- Highest elevation: 172 m (564 ft)
- Lowest elevation: 55 m (180 ft)
- Population (2023): 3,117
  - Density: 186.5/km^{2} (483.1/sq mi)
- Time zone: UTC+01:00 (CET)
  - Summer (DST): UTC+02:00 (CEST)
- INSEE/Postal code: 76591 /76160
- ^{1} French Land Register data, which excludes lakes, ponds, glaciers > 1 km^{2} (0.386 sq mi or 247 acres) and river estuaries.

Saint-Jacques-sur-Darnétal (French pronunciation: [sɛ̃ ʒak syʁ daʁnetal], literally Saint-Jacques on Darnétal) is a commune in the Seine-Maritime department in the Normandy region in north-western France.

== Geography ==
A small town of forestry, farming and light industry, just 5 miles (8.0 km) east of the centre of Rouen at the junction of the D 7, D 43, D 91 with the N 31 (former N 30) road.

== Population ==
Historical population
Year	Pop.	±% p.a.
1968	1,175	—
1975	1,561	+4.14%
1982	2,040	+3.90%
1990	2,407	+2.09%
1999	2,492	+0.39%
2007	2,576	+0.42%
2012	2,587	+0.09%
2017	2,835	+1.85%
2023	3,117	+1.59%
Source: INSEE

== Places of interest ==
- The church of St. Jacques, dating from the 19th century.
- A 16th-century cemetery cross.
- The chapel at Quévreville la Milon, built in 1828.

== See also ==
- Communes of the Seine-Maritime department
