= Roncherolles-sur-le-Vivier =

- Commune
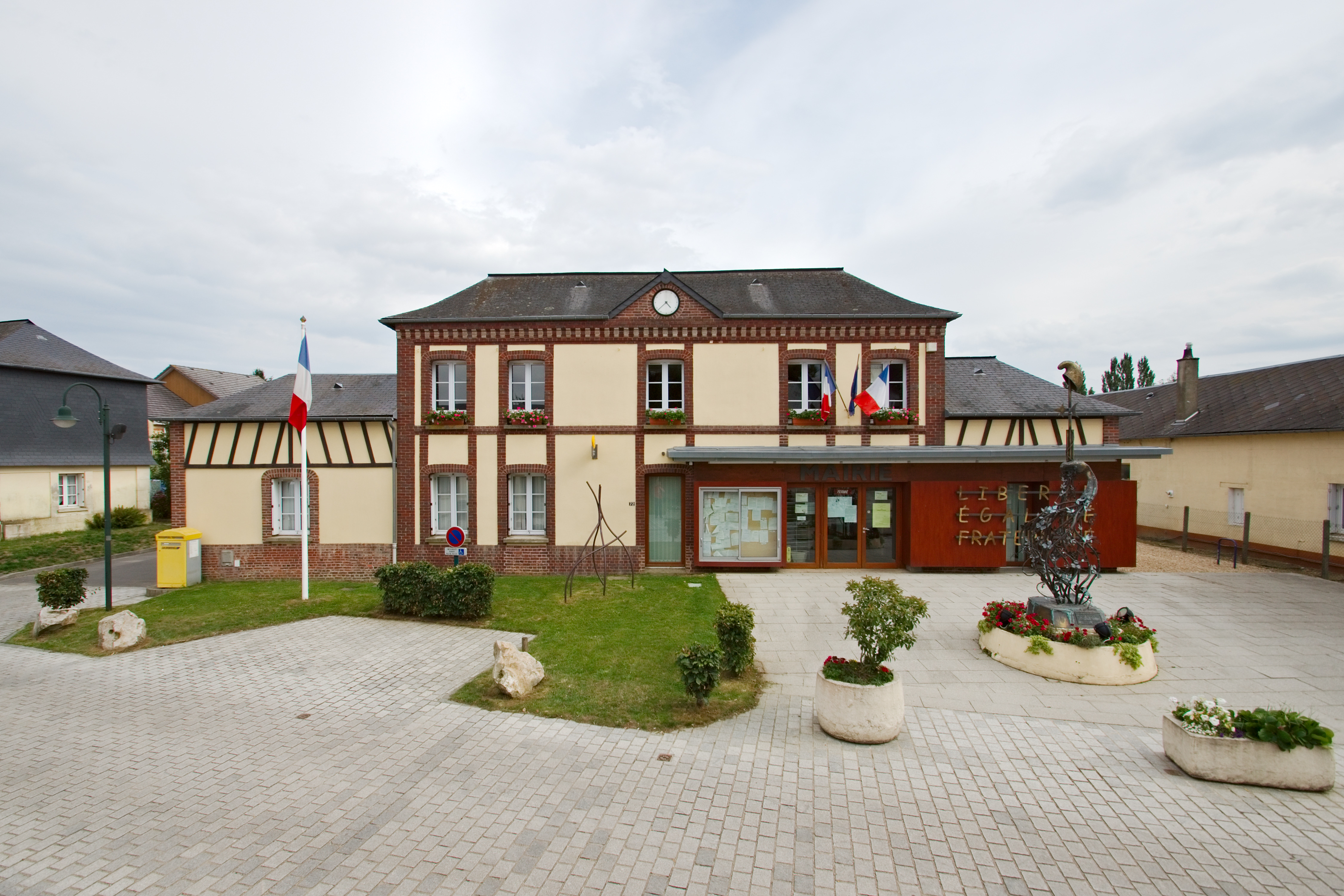
- The town hall in Roncherolles-sur-le-Vivier
- Location of Roncherolles-sur-le-Vivier
- Location within France Location within Normandy
- Coordinates: 49°28′01″N 1°11′02″E
- Country: France
- Region: Normandy
- Department: Seine-Maritime
- Arrondissement: Rouen
- Canton: Darnétal
- Intercommunality: Métropole Rouen Normandie

Government
  - Mayor (2020–2026): Sylvaine Santo
- Area^{1}: 5.35 km^{2} (2.07 sq mi)
- Elevation: 150 m (490 ft)
- Highest elevation: 169 m (554 ft)
- Lowest elevation: 38 m (125 ft)
- Population (2023): 1,245
  - Density: 233/km^{2} (603/sq mi)
- Time zone: UTC+01:00 (CET)
  - Summer (DST): UTC+02:00 (CEST)
- INSEE/Postal code: 76536 /76160
- ^{1} French Land Register data, which excludes lakes, ponds, glaciers > 1 km^{2} (0.386 sq mi or 247 acres) and river estuaries.

Roncherolles-sur-le-Vivier (French pronunciation: [ʁɔ̃ʃʁɔl syʁ lə vivje]) is a commune in the Seine-Maritime department in the Normandy region in northern France.

== Geography ==
A village of forestry and farming situated in the Pays de Bray, just 5 miles (8.0 km) northeast of Rouen at the junction of the D15 and the D91 roads.

== Population ==
Historical population
Year	Pop.	±% p.a.
1968	378	—
1975	505	+4.22%
1982	845	+7.63%
1990	1,069	+2.98%
1999	1,092	+0.24%
2007	1,103	+0.13%
2012	1,079	−0.44%
2017	1,114	+0.64%
2023	1,245	+1.87%
Source: INSEE

== Places of interest ==
- The church of the Trinity, dating from the seventeenth century.
- The manorhouse de Bimare.
- The seventeenth-century château de Guillerville and its chapel.

== See also ==
- Communes of the Seine-Maritime department
