= Saint-Léger-du-Bourg-Denis =

- Commune
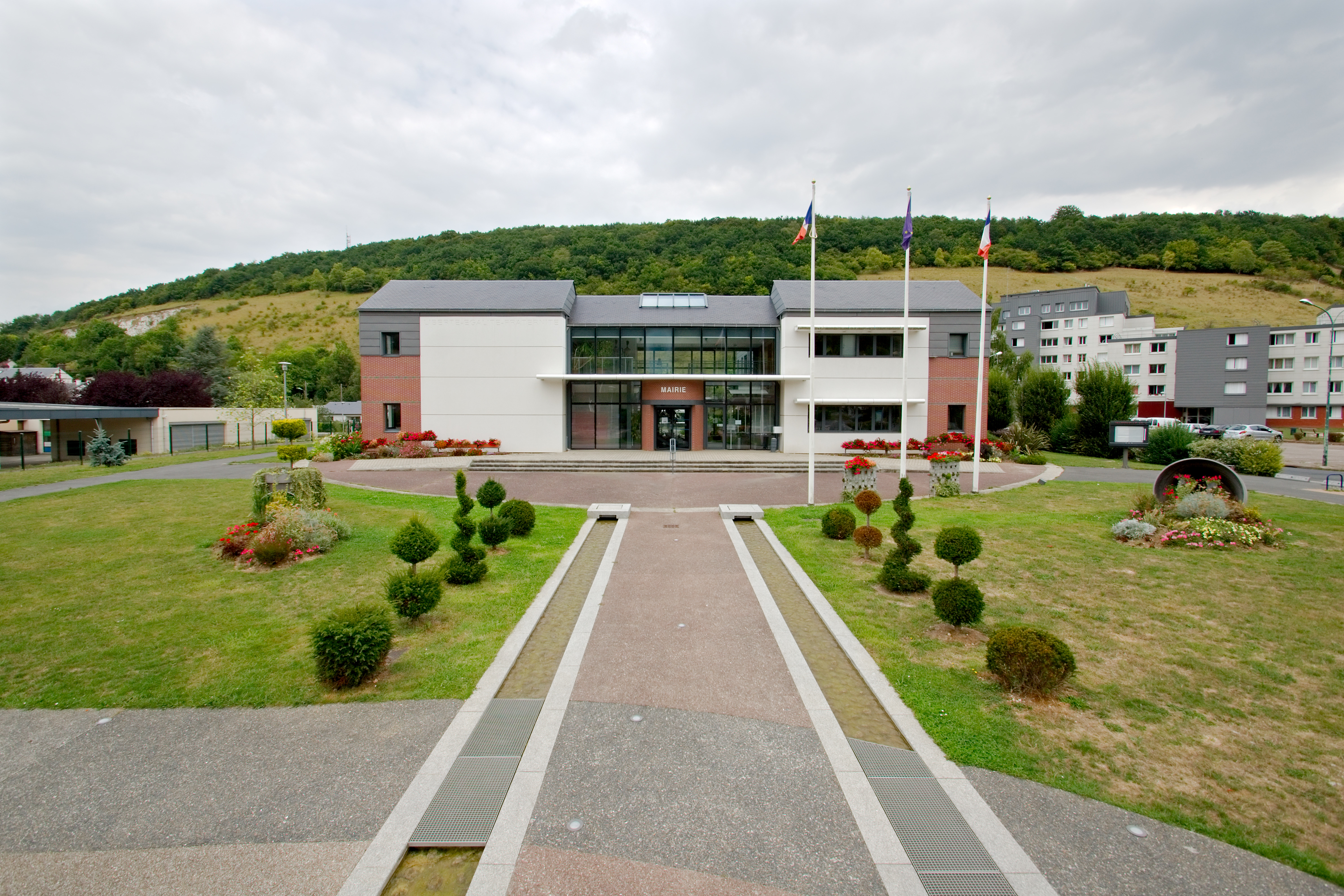
- The town hall in Saint-Léger-du-Bourg-Denis

- Coat of arms
- Location of Saint-Léger-du-Bourg-Denis
- Location within France Location within Normandy
- Coordinates: 49°26′07″N 1°09′05″E
- Country: France
- Region: Normandy
- Department: Seine-Maritime
- Arrondissement: Rouen
- Canton: Darnétal
- Intercommunality: Métropole Rouen Normandie

Government
  - Mayor (2026–32): Sophie Boucquiaux
- Area^{1}: 2.81 km^{2} (1.08 sq mi)
- Elevation: 133 m (436 ft)
- Highest elevation: 138 m (453 ft)
- Lowest elevation: 20 m (66 ft)
- Population (2023): 3,633
  - Density: 1,290/km^{2} (3,350/sq mi)
- Time zone: UTC+01:00 (CET)
  - Summer (DST): UTC+02:00 (CEST)
- INSEE/Postal code: 76599 /76160
- ^{1} French Land Register data, which excludes lakes, ponds, glaciers > 1 km^{2} (0.386 sq mi or 247 acres) and river estuaries.

Saint-Léger-du-Bourg-Denis (French pronunciation: [sɛ̃ leʒe dy buʁ dəni]) is a commune in the Seine-Maritime department in the Normandy region in northern France.

== Geography ==
Saint-Léger-du-Bourg-Denis is a light industrial suburban town surrounded by woodland and situated in the Roumois, just 3 miles (4.8 km) east of the centre of Rouen at the junction of the D42 and the D138 roads.

== History ==
=== Etymology ===
The current official name of the town derives from a mistaken etymology dating back to French Revolution. Political authorities have retained and not reformed this quaint error to the present day. A more rational name would be "Saint-Léger-Bourdeny", after its ancient name "Bourdeny", a Gallo-Roman toponym in -acum, formed with the Germanic personal name Burdinus, thus Burdiniacum > Bourdeny. Burdinus, a given name, gave rise to the patronymic surnames Bourdain and Bourdin, common in west central France.

A similar name can be found in the Merovingian toponym Bourdainville.

=== Heraldry ===
Arms of Saint-Léger-du-Bourg-Denis	The arms of Saint-Léger-du-Bourg-Denis are blazoned : Gules, a chevron between 2 leopards heads and a spindle bendwise sinister argent.

== Population ==
Historical population
Year	Pop.	±% p.a.
1968	2,144	—
1975	2,381	+1.51%
1982	2,953	+3.12%
1990	2,772	−0.79%
1999	3,124	+1.34%
2007	3,263	+0.55%
2012	3,449	+1.11%
2017	3,450	+0.01%
2023	3,633	+0.87%
Source: INSEE

== Places of interest ==
- The church of St.Léger, dating from the sixteenth century.
- The debris of a tenth-century castle.

== See also ==
- Communes of the Seine-Maritime department
