= Gouy, Seine-Maritime =

Gouy
- Commune
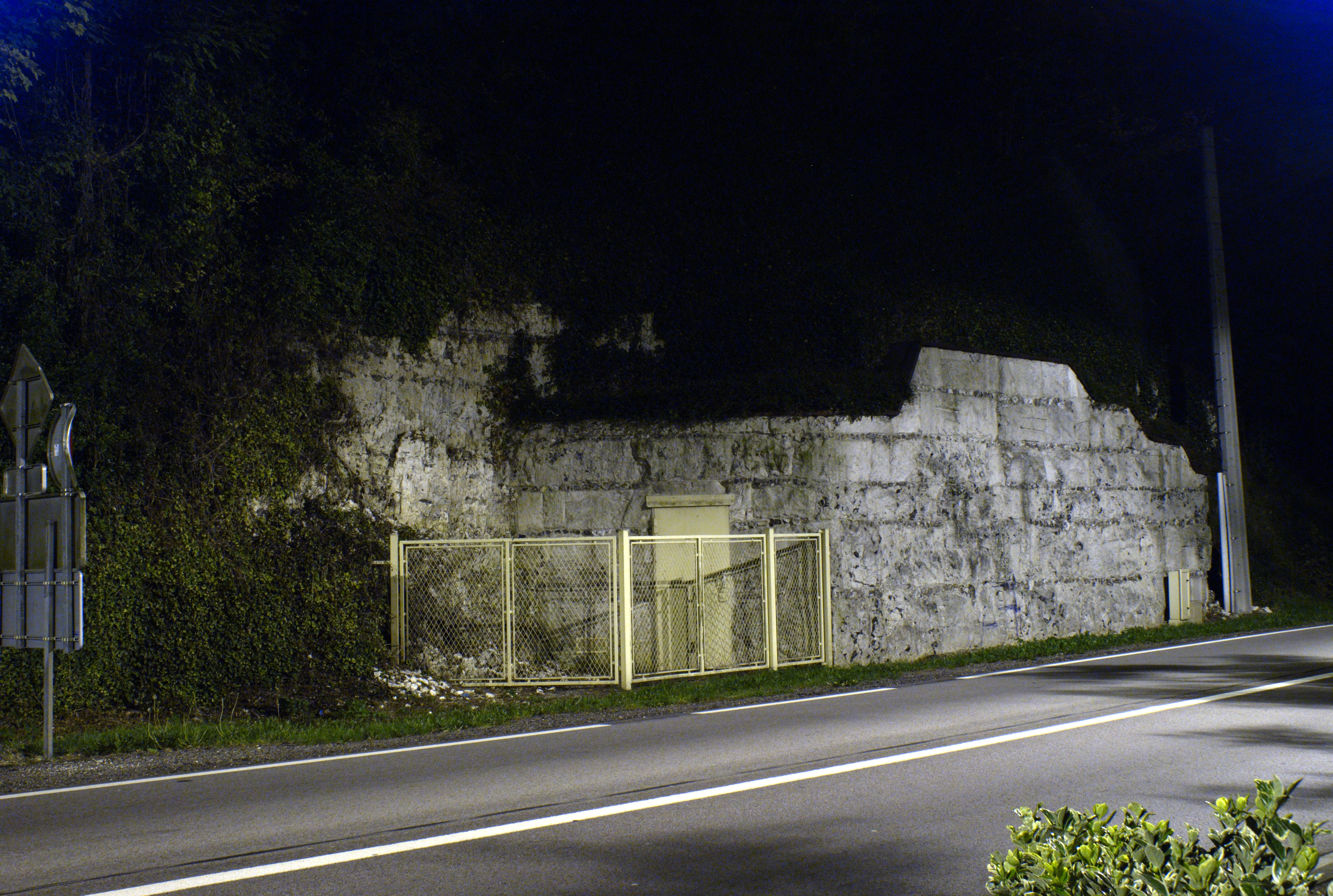
- The entrance to the Gouy Cave

- Coat of arms
- Location of Gouy
- Location within France Location within Normandy
- Coordinates: 49°21′19″N 1°08′54″E
- Country: France
- Region: Normandy
- Department: Seine-Maritime
- Arrondissement: Rouen
- Canton: Darnétal
- Intercommunality: Métropole Rouen Normandie

Government
  - Mayor (2020–2026): Jean-Pierre Breugnot
- Area^{1}: 4.97 km^{2} (1.92 sq mi)
- Elevation: 76 m (249 ft)
- Highest elevation: 133 m (436 ft)
- Lowest elevation: 2 m (6.6 ft)
- Population (2023): 888
  - Density: 179/km^{2} (463/sq mi)
- Time zone: UTC+01:00 (CET)
  - Summer (DST): UTC+02:00 (CEST)
- INSEE/Postal code: 76313 /76520
- ^{1} French Land Register data, which excludes lakes, ponds, glaciers > 1 km^{2} (0.386 sq mi or 247 acres) and river estuaries.

Gouy (French pronunciation: [ɡwi]) is a commune in the Seine-Maritime department in the Normandy region in northern France.

== Geography ==
A farming village situated by the banks of the river Seine, some 6 miles (9.7 km) southeast of the centre of Rouen, at the junction of the D6015 and the D91 roads.

== Heraldry ==
Arms of Gouy	The arms of Gouy are blazoned : Per fess argent and azure, 2 keys in saltire sable and 3 baguettes palewise 2 & 1 Or.

== Population ==
Historical population
Year	Pop.	±% p.a.
1968	348	—
1975	446	+3.61%
1982	468	+0.69%
1990	644	+4.07%
1999	794	+2.35%
2007	819	+0.39%
2012	798	−0.52%
2017	869	+1.72%
2023	888	+0.36%
Source: INSEE

== Places of interest ==
- The church of St.Pierre and Paul, dating from the twelfth century.
- Prehistoric finds in caves and graves by the Seine.

== See also ==
- Communes of the Seine-Maritime department
