= Ymare =

- Commune
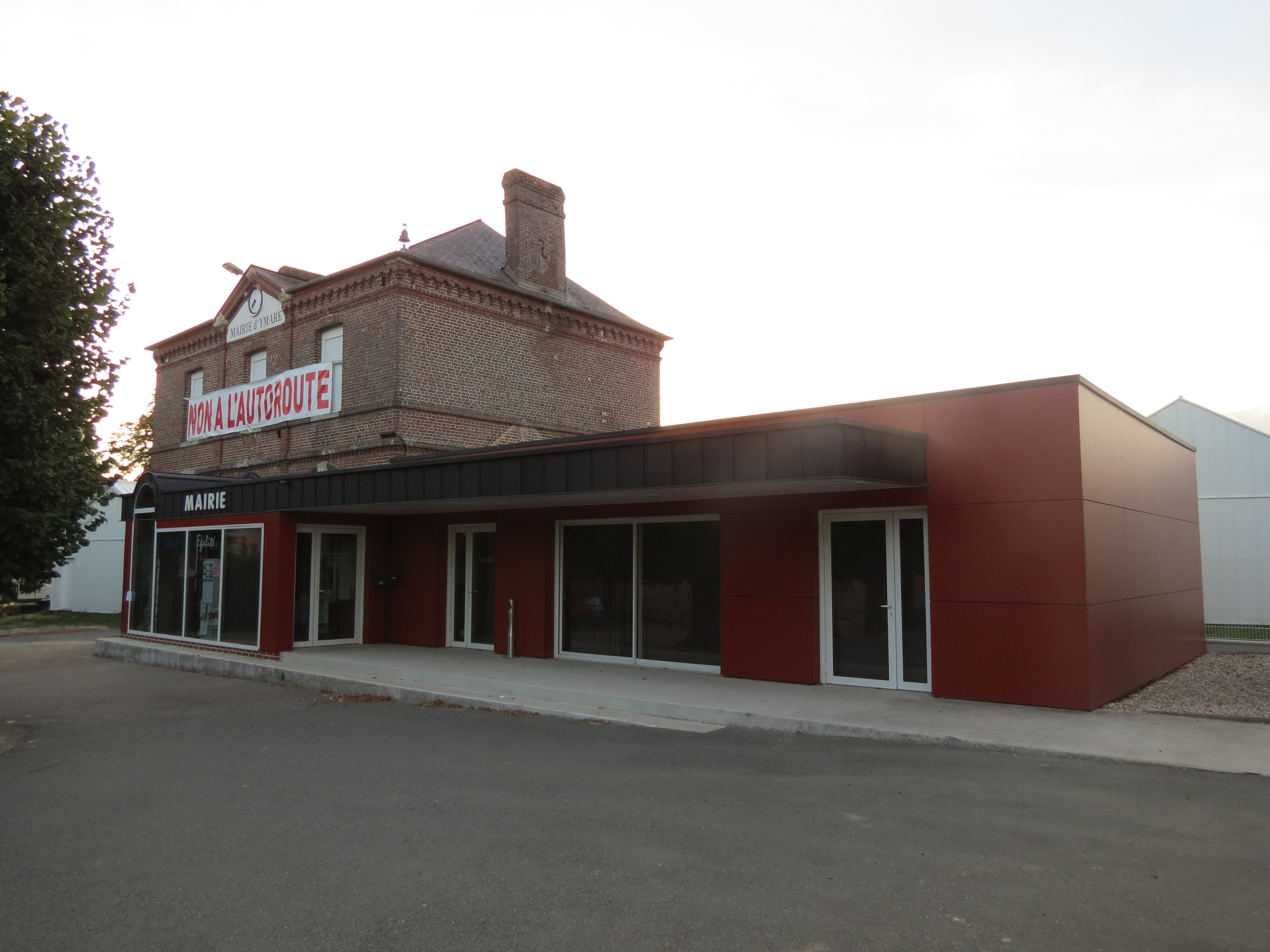
- Town hall
- Location of Ymare
- Location within France Location within Normandy
- Coordinates: 49°20′59″N 1°10′35″E
- Country: France
- Region: Normandy
- Department: Seine-Maritime
- Arrondissement: Rouen
- Canton: Darnétal
- Intercommunality: Rouen Normandie

Government
  - Mayor (2020–2026): Ingrid Bona
- Area^{1}: 4.03 km^{2} (1.56 sq mi)
- Elevation: 138 m (453 ft)
- Highest elevation: 153 m (502 ft)
- Lowest elevation: 47 m (154 ft)
- Population (2023): 1,245
  - Density: 309/km^{2} (800/sq mi)
- Time zone: UTC+01:00 (CET)
  - Summer (DST): UTC+02:00 (CEST)
- INSEE/Postal code: 76753 /76520
- ^{1} French Land Register data, which excludes lakes, ponds, glaciers > 1 km^{2} (0.386 sq mi or 247 acres) and river estuaries.

Ymare (French pronunciation: [imaʁ]) is a commune in the Seine-Maritime department in the Normandy region in northern France.

== Geography ==
A farming village situated in the Roumois, some 8 miles (13 km) south of Rouen at the junction of the D95 with the D13 road.

== Population ==
Historical population
Year	Pop.	±% p.a.
1968	274	—
1975	351	+3.60%
1982	830	+13.08%
1990	950	+1.70%
1999	1,040	+1.01%
2007	1,114	+0.86%
2012	1,152	+0.67%
2017	1,154	+0.03%
2023	1,245	+1.27%
Source: INSEE

== Places of interest ==
- The church of St. Aubin and St. Anne, dating from the seventeenth century.
- A seventeenth-century stone cross.
- An old dovecote.

== See also ==
- Communes of the Seine-Maritime department
