= Saint-Aubin-Épinay =

- Commune
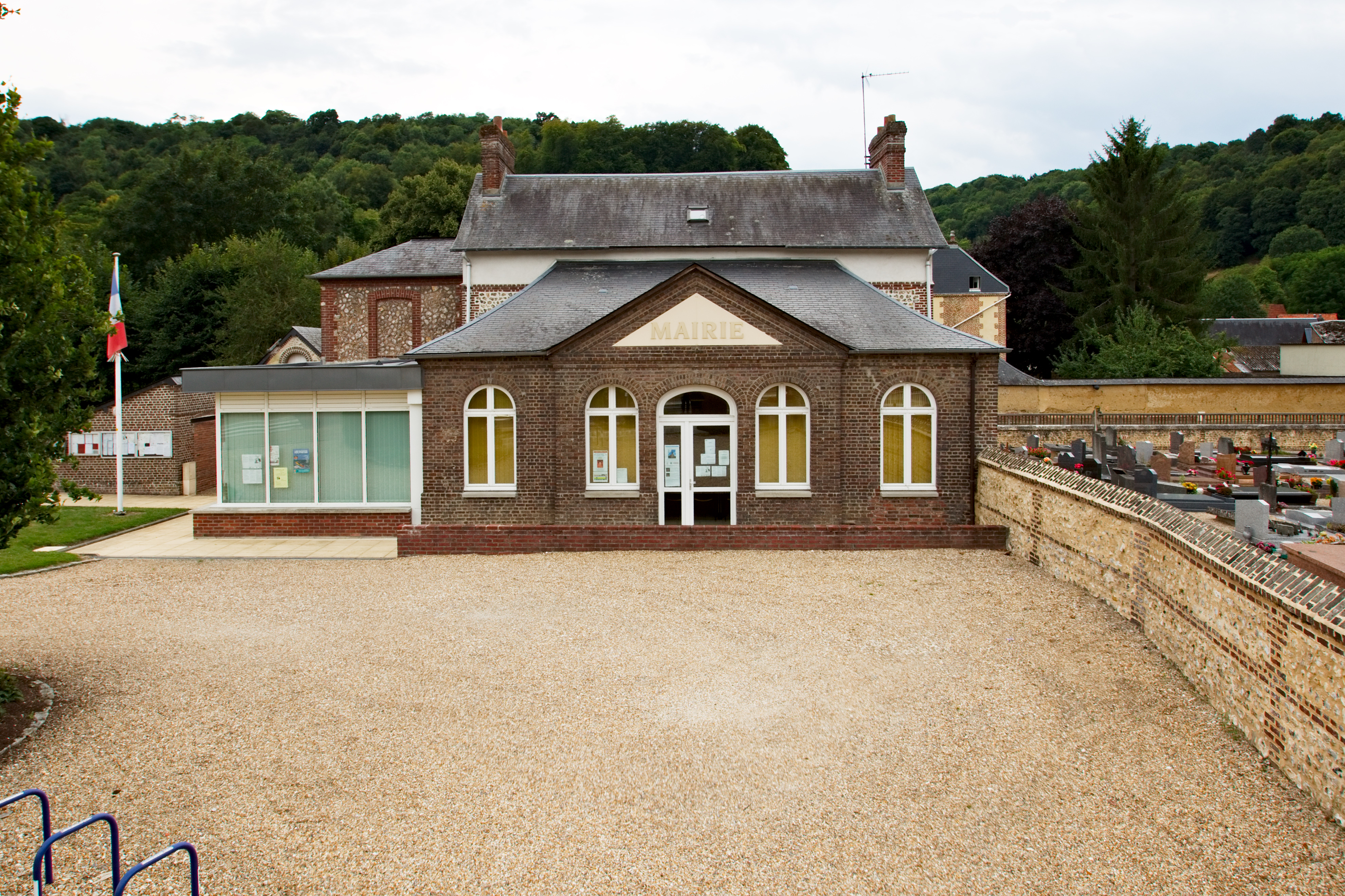
- The town hall in Saint-Aubin-Épinay
- Location of Saint-Aubin-Épinay
- Location within France Location within Normandy
- Coordinates: 49°25′23″N 1°10′41″E
- Country: France
- Region: Normandy
- Department: Seine-Maritime
- Arrondissement: Rouen
- Canton: Darnétal
- Intercommunality: Métropole Rouen Normandie

Government
  - Mayor (2026–32): Benoît Anquetin
- Area^{1}: 9.83 km^{2} (3.80 sq mi)
- Elevation: 44 m (144 ft)
- Highest elevation: 159 m (522 ft)
- Lowest elevation: 35 m (115 ft)
- Population (2023): 1,021
  - Density: 104/km^{2} (269/sq mi)
- Time zone: UTC+01:00 (CET)
  - Summer (DST): UTC+02:00 (CEST)
- INSEE/Postal code: 76560 /76160
- ^{1} French Land Register data, which excludes lakes, ponds, glaciers > 1 km^{2} (0.386 sq mi or 247 acres) and river estuaries.

Saint-Aubin-Épinay (French pronunciation: [sɛ̃.t‿obɛ̃ epinɛ]) is a commune in the Seine-Maritime department in the Normandy region in north-western France.

== Geography ==
A farming village situated just 4 miles (6.4 km) southeast of the centre of Rouen near the junction of the D 7, D 42 and the D 91 roads. The small river Aubette has its source within the commune's borders.

== History ==
The commune was created in 1823 by the merger of the former communes of Épinay and Saint-Aubin-la-Rivière.

== Population ==
Historical population
Year	Pop.	±% p.a.
1968	573	—
1975	502	−1.87%
1982	555	+1.44%
1990	917	+6.48%
1999	949	+0.38%
2007	951	+0.03%
2012	1,001	+1.03%
2017	1,033	+0.63%
2023	1,021	−0.19%
Source: INSEE

== Places of interest ==
- The church of St. Aubin in Saint-Aubin-la-Rivière, dating from the nineteenth century.
- The manorhouse du Meslay.
- A watermill.
- The seventeenth-century church of Notre-Dame in Épinay-sur-Aubette.
- A dovecote.

== See also ==
- Communes of the Seine-Maritime department
