= Quévreville-la-Poterie =

- Commune
- Coat of arms
- Location of Quévreville-la-Poterie
- Location within France Location within Normandy
- Coordinates: 49°21′19″N 1°11′27″E
- Country: France
- Region: Normandy
- Department: Seine-Maritime
- Arrondissement: Rouen
- Canton: Darnétal
- Intercommunality: Métropole Rouen Normandie

Government
  - Mayor (2026–32): Benoît Hue
- Area^{1}: 4.68 km^{2} (1.81 sq mi)
- Elevation: 120 m (390 ft)
- Highest elevation: 156 m (512 ft)
- Lowest elevation: 40 m (130 ft)
- Population (2023): 1,028
  - Density: 220/km^{2} (569/sq mi)
- Time zone: UTC+01:00 (CET)
  - Summer (DST): UTC+02:00 (CEST)
- INSEE/Postal code: 76514 /76520
- ^{1} French Land Register data, which excludes lakes, ponds, glaciers > 1 km^{2} (0.386 sq mi or 247 acres) and river estuaries.

Quévreville-la-Poterie (French pronunciation: [kevʁəvil la pɔtʁi]) is a commune in the Seine-Maritime department in the Normandy region in northern France.

== Geography ==
A farming village situated some 9 miles (14 km) southeast of Rouen at the junction of the D13 and the D95 roads. The commune borders the department of Eure.

== Heraldry ==
| Arms of Quévreville-la-Poterie | The arms of Quévreville-la-Poterie are blazoned : Per fess vert and gules, 3 goats couchant (1st to dexter contourny, 2nd in center overlapping, 3rd smaller and to sinister chief), and a necked pot proper. |

== Population ==
Historical population
| Year | Pop. | ±% p.a. |
|---|---|---|
| 1968 | 205 | — |
| 1975 | 573 | +15.82% |
| 1982 | 816 | +5.18% |
| 1990 | 1,044 | +3.13% |
| 1999 | 987 | −0.62% |
| 2007 | 928 | −0.77% |
| 2012 | 942 | +0.30% |
| 2017 | 992 | +1.04% |
| 2023 | 1,028 | +0.60% |
Source: INSEE

== Places of interest ==
- The church of Notre-Dame, dating from the eleventh century.
- A medieval manorhouse.

== See also ==
- Communes of the Seine-Maritime department
