= Saint-Aubin-Celloville =

- Commune
- Coat of arms
- Location of Saint-Aubin-Celloville
- Location within France Location within Normandy
- Coordinates: 49°21′53″N 1°09′36″E
- Country: France
- Region: Normandy
- Department: Seine-Maritime
- Arrondissement: Rouen
- Canton: Darnétal
- Intercommunality: Métropole Rouen Normandie

Government
  - Mayor (2026–32): Elisa Dufosse
- Area^{1}: 6.72 km^{2} (2.59 sq mi)
- Elevation: 140 m (460 ft)
- Highest elevation: 157 m (515 ft)
- Lowest elevation: 30 m (98 ft)
- Population (2023): 1,173
  - Density: 175/km^{2} (452/sq mi)
- Time zone: UTC+01:00 (CET)
  - Summer (DST): UTC+02:00 (CEST)
- INSEE/Postal code: 76558 /76520
- ^{1} French Land Register data, which excludes lakes, ponds, glaciers > 1 km^{2} (0.386 sq mi or 247 acres) and river estuaries.

Saint-Aubin-Celloville (French pronunciation: [sɛ̃t‿obɛ̃ selɔvil]) is a commune in the Seine-Maritime department in the Normandy region in northern France.

== Geography ==
The commune is a farming village situated near the banks of the Seine, some 8 miles (13 km) south of Rouen at the junction of the D91, D95 and the D291 roads.

== Heraldry ==
Arms of Saint-Aubin-Celloville	The arms of Saint-Aubin-Celloville are blazoned : Per pale 1: Gules, a crozier between the letters S and A Or; 2:Azure, the local belltower surmounting another smaller one, argent; on a base ployé Or a pot gules. (the French blazon is 'enté en point' which is basically a triangular base with curved sides. Not really used in English heraldry.)

== Population ==
Historical population
Year	Pop.	±% p.a.
1968	473	—
1975	654	+4.74%
1982	681	+0.58%
1990	990	+4.79%
1999	1,015	+0.28%
2007	963	−0.66%
2012	956	−0.15%
2017	1,057	+2.03%
2023	1,173	+1.75%
Source: INSEE

== Places of interest ==
- The church of St. Aubin, dating from the eleventh century.
- The church of St. Pierre, dating from the seventeenth century.
- A seventeenth-century stone cross.
- The Château d'Incarville.

== See also ==
- Communes of the Seine-Maritime department
