= Amfreville-la-Mi-Voie =

- Commune
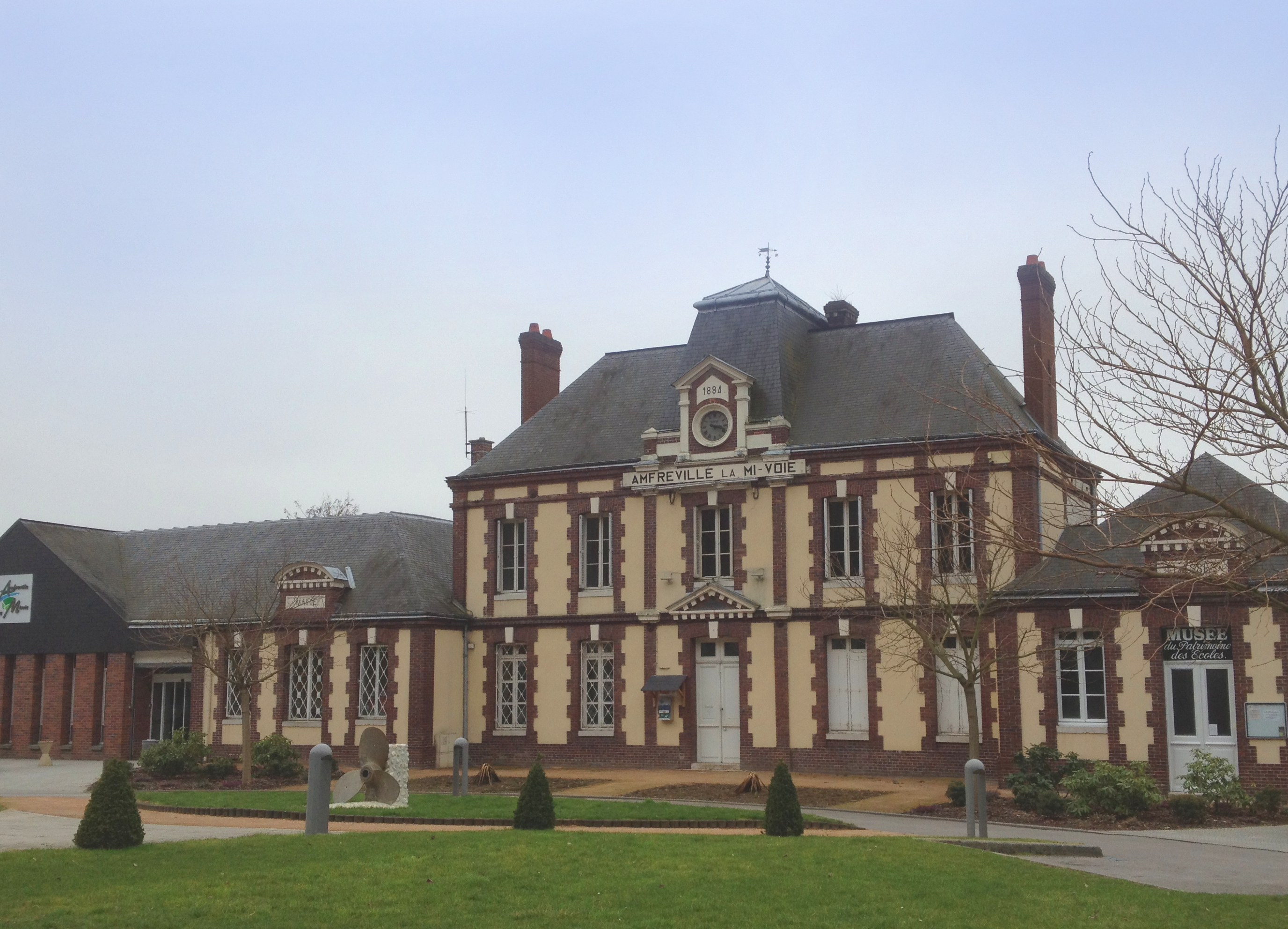
- The town hall in Amfreville-la-Mi-Voie

- Coat of arms
- Location of Amfreville-la-Mi-Voie
- Location within France Location within Normandy
- Coordinates: 49°24′10″N 1°07′52″E
- Country: France
- Region: Normandy
- Department: Seine-Maritime
- Arrondissement: Rouen
- Canton: Darnétal
- Intercommunality: Métropole Rouen Normandie

Government
  - Mayor (2026–32): Hugo Langlois
- Area^{1}: 3.89 km^{2} (1.50 sq mi)
- Elevation: 45 m (148 ft)
- Highest elevation: 145 m (476 ft)
- Lowest elevation: 3 m (9.8 ft)
- Population (2023): 3,265
  - Density: 839/km^{2} (2,170/sq mi)
- Time zone: UTC+01:00 (CET)
  - Summer (DST): UTC+02:00 (CEST)
- INSEE/Postal code: 76005 /76920
- ^{1} French Land Register data, which excludes lakes, ponds, glaciers > 1 km^{2} (0.386 sq mi or 247 acres) and river estuaries.

Amfreville-la-Mi-Voie (French pronunciation: [ɑ̃fʁəvil la mi vwa]) is a commune in the Seine-Maritime department in the Normandy region in northern France.

== Geography ==
A small light industrial town situated by the banks of the river Seine in the southern suburbs of Rouen at the junction of the D6015 and the D94 roads.

== Population ==
Historical population
Year	Pop.	±% p.a.
1968	2,430	—
1975	2,093	−2.11%
1982	2,509	+2.62%
1990	2,556	+0.23%
1999	2,869	+1.29%
2007	3,042	+0.73%
2012	3,205	+1.05%
2017	3,273	+0.42%
2023	3,265	−0.04%
Source: INSEE

== Places of interest ==
- The church of St.Remi, dating from the early 20th century.
- The mairie, built in 1884.
- The Lacoste public park.

== See also ==
- Communes of the Seine-Maritime department
