= Saint-Martin-du-Vivier =

- Commune
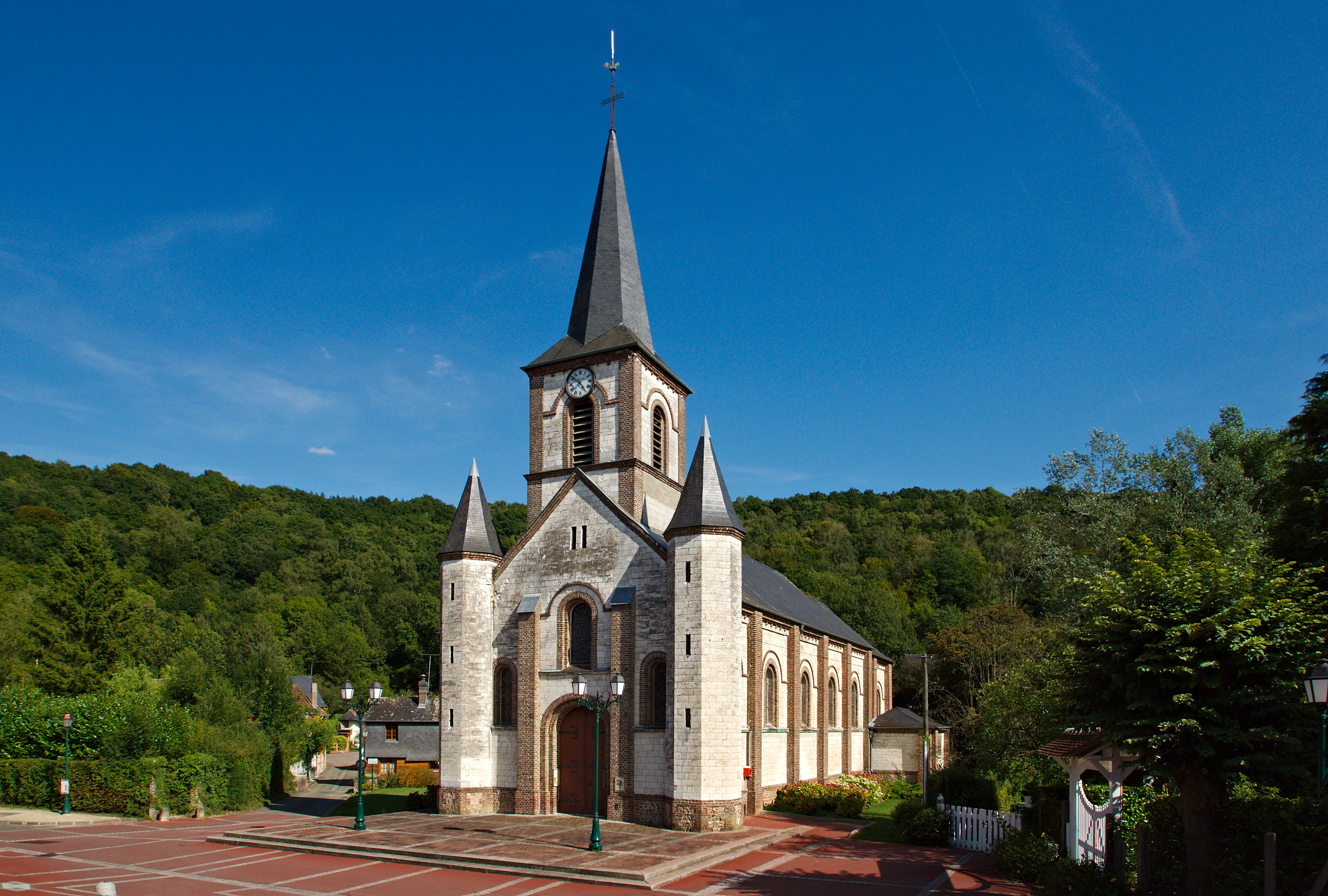
- The church in Saint-Martin-du-Vivier

- Coat of arms
- Location of Saint-Martin-du-Vivier
- Location within France Location within Normandy
- Coordinates: 49°28′08″N 1°09′54″E
- Country: France
- Region: Normandy
- Department: Seine-Maritime
- Arrondissement: Rouen
- Canton: Darnétal
- Intercommunality: Métropole Rouen Normandie

Government
  - Mayor (2026–32): Valérie Berthéol
- Area^{1}: 5 km^{2} (1.9 sq mi)
- Elevation: 56 m (184 ft)
- Highest elevation: 156 m (512 ft)
- Lowest elevation: 40 m (130 ft)
- Population (2023): 1,674
  - Density: 330/km^{2} (870/sq mi)
- Time zone: UTC+01:00 (CET)
  - Summer (DST): UTC+02:00 (CEST)
- INSEE/Postal code: 76617 /76160
- ^{1} French Land Register data, which excludes lakes, ponds, glaciers > 1 km^{2} (0.386 sq mi or 247 acres) and river estuaries.

Saint-Martin-du-Vivier (French pronunciation: [sɛ̃ maʁtɛ̃ dy vivje]) is a commune in the Seine-Maritime department in the Normandy region in northern France.

== Geography ==
A farming village situated just 4 miles (6.4 km) northeast of the centre of Rouen at the junction of the D47 and the D443 roads. SNCF operates a TER railway service here.

== Heraldry ==
Arms of Saint-Martin-du-Vivier	The arms of Saint-Martin-du-Vivier are blazoned : Per fess Or and gules, an oak twig with an acorn and leaf vert bendwise and a sprig of holly vert fructed gules bendwise sinister, the two in crossed in saltire, and a mill wheel issuant from a fess abased wavy argent.

== Population ==
Historical population
Year	Pop.	±% p.a.
1968	569	—
1975	920	+7.11%
1982	1,369	+5.84%
1990	1,445	+0.68%
1999	1,484	+0.30%
2007	1,784	+2.33%
2012	1,713	−0.81%
2017	1,629	−1.00%
2023	1,674	+0.46%
Source: INSEE

== Places of interest ==
- The church of St. Martin, dating from the nineteenth century.
- An ancient cedar tree, said to be over 200 years old.
- The eighteenth-century manorhouse at Mesnil-Grémichon.
- The chateau and chapel of Mont-Perreux.

== See also ==
- Communes of the Seine-Maritime department
