= Fontaine-sous-Préaux =

- Commune
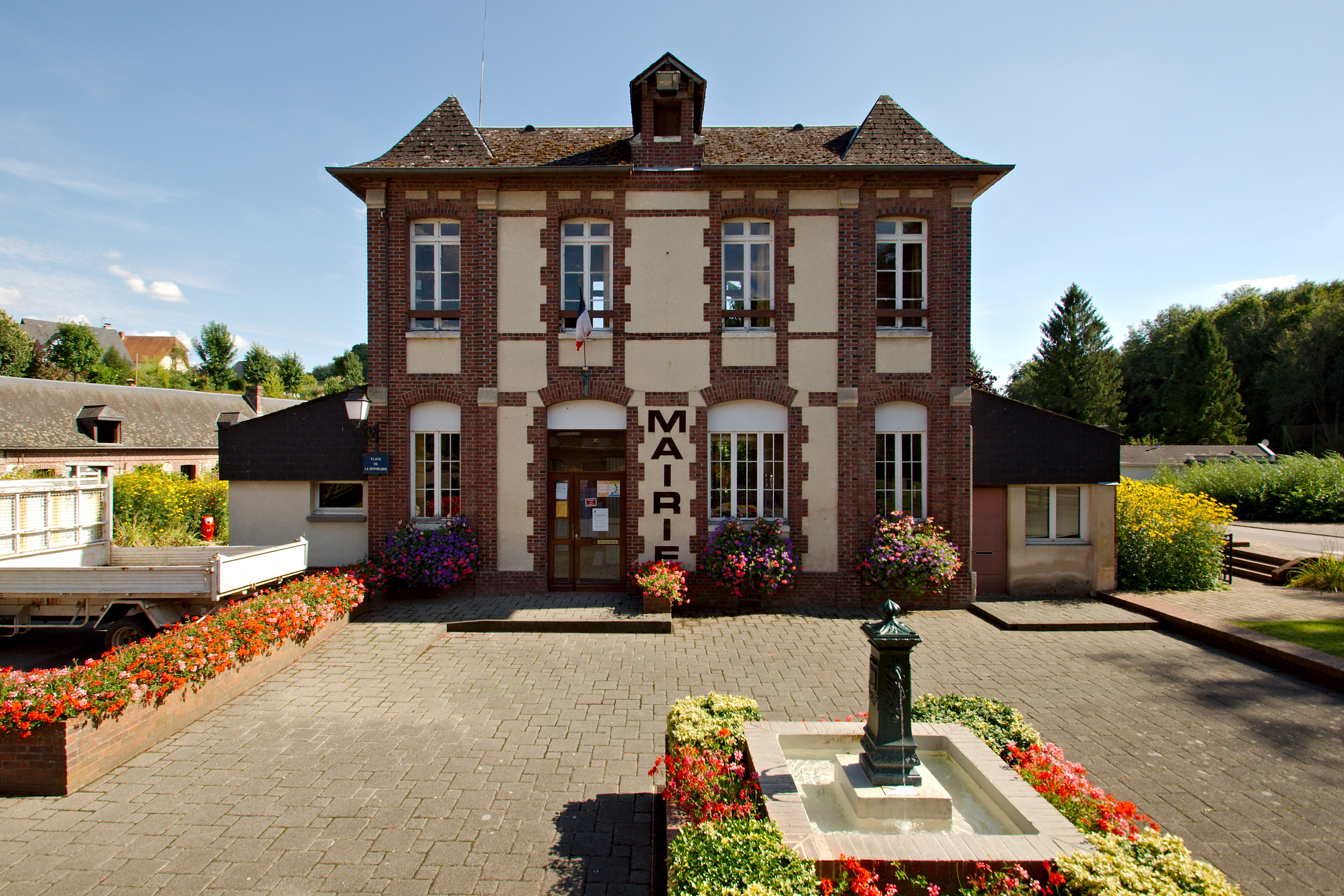
- The town hall in Fontaine-sous-Préaux
- Location of Fontaine-sous-Préaux
- Location within France Location within Normandy
- Coordinates: 49°29′07″N 1°10′08″E
- Country: France
- Region: Normandy
- Department: Seine-Maritime
- Arrondissement: Rouen
- Canton: Darnétal
- Intercommunality: Métropole Rouen Normandie

Government
  - Mayor (2020–2026): Francis Debrey
- Area^{1}: 3.52 km^{2} (1.36 sq mi)
- Elevation: 80 m (260 ft)
- Highest elevation: 158 m (518 ft)
- Lowest elevation: 61 m (200 ft)
- Population (2023): 569
  - Density: 162/km^{2} (419/sq mi)
- Time zone: UTC+01:00 (CET)
  - Summer (DST): UTC+02:00 (CEST)
- INSEE/Postal code: 76273 /76160
- ^{1} French Land Register data, which excludes lakes, ponds, glaciers > 1 km^{2} (0.386 sq mi or 247 acres) and river estuaries.

Fontaine-sous-Préaux (French pronunciation: [fɔ̃tɛn su pʁeo]) is a commune in the Seine-Maritime department in the Normandy region in northern France.

== Geography ==
A village of forestry and farming situated just 3 miles (4.8 km) northeast of the centre of Rouen, at the junction of the D47 and the D91 roads.

== Population ==
Historical population
| Year | Pop. | ±% p.a. |
|---|---|---|
| 1968 | 186 | — |
| 1975 | 263 | +5.07% |
| 1982 | 304 | +2.09% |
| 1990 | 474 | +5.71% |
| 1999 | 464 | −0.24% |
| 2007 | 559 | +2.36% |
| 2012 | 509 | −1.86% |
| 2017 | 508 | −0.04% |
| 2023 | 569 | +1.91% |
Source: INSEE

== Places of interest ==
- The church of St.Pierre, dating from the nineteenth century.

== See also ==
- Communes of the Seine-Maritime department
