= Hautot-sur-Seine =

- Commune
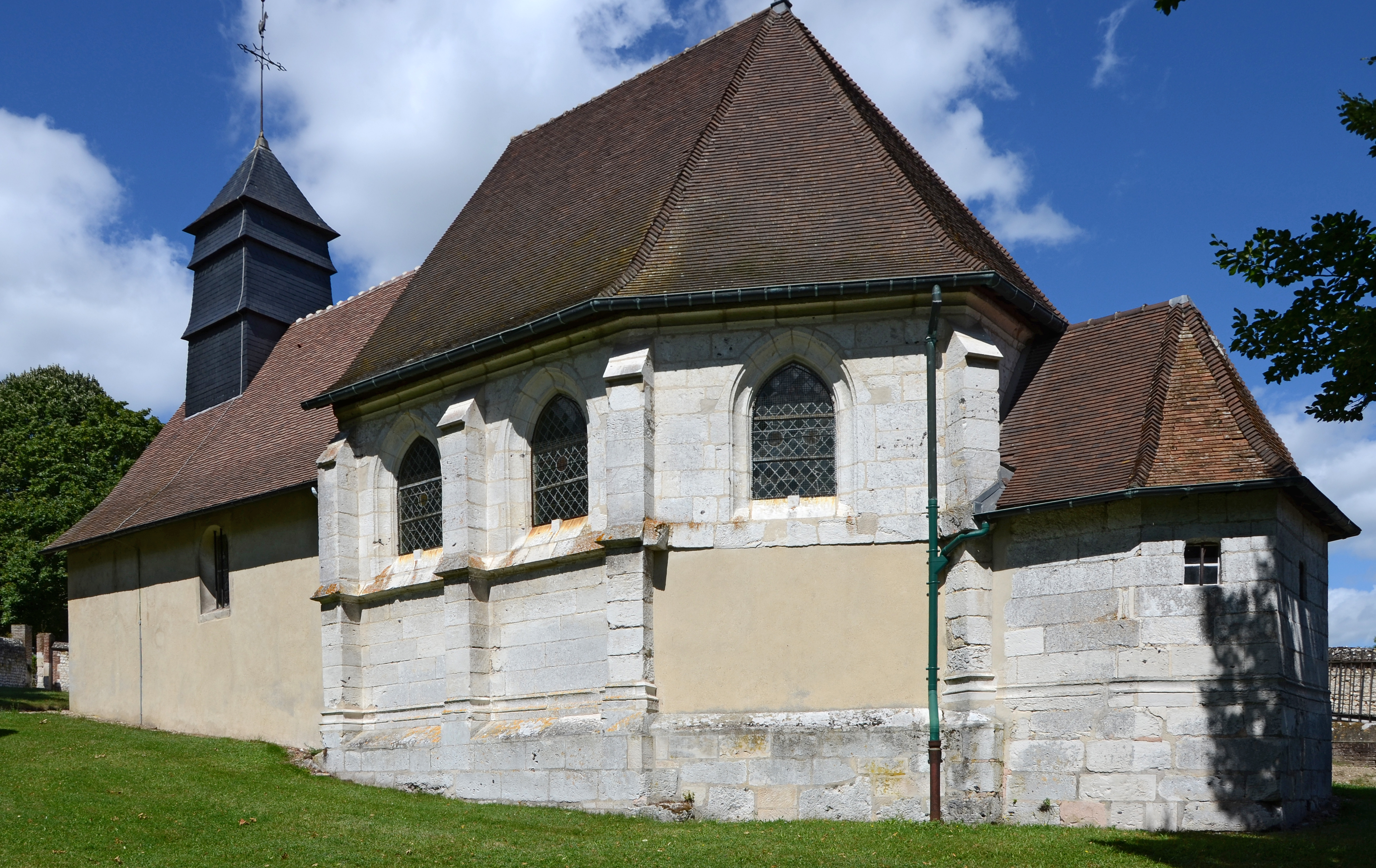
- Church of Saint-Antoine et Saint-Thibaud

- Coat of arms
- Location of Hautot-sur-Seine
- Location within France Location within Normandy
- Coordinates: 49°21′44″N 0°58′47″E
- Country: France
- Region: Normandy
- Department: Seine-Maritime
- Arrondissement: Rouen
- Canton: Canteleu
- Intercommunality: Métropole Rouen-Normandie

Government
  - Mayor (2020–2026): Jean-Louis Roussel
- Area^{1}: 2.16 km^{2} (0.83 sq mi)
- Elevation: 7 m (23 ft)
- Highest elevation: 58 m (190 ft)
- Lowest elevation: 1 m (3.3 ft)
- Population (2023): 399
  - Density: 185/km^{2} (478/sq mi)
- Time zone: UTC+01:00 (CET)
  - Summer (DST): UTC+02:00 (CEST)
- INSEE/Postal code: 76350 /76113
- Website: hautot-sur-seine.fr
- ^{1} French Land Register data, which excludes lakes, ponds, glaciers > 1 km^{2} (0.386 sq mi or 247 acres) and river estuaries.

Hautot-sur-Seine (French pronunciation: [oto syʁ sɛn], literally Hautot on Seine) is a commune in the Seine-Maritime department in the Normandy region in north-western France.

== Heraldry ==
Arms of Hautot-sur-Seine	The arms of Hautot-sur-Seine are blazoned : Gules, a chevron between 2 ears of wheat Or and a trefoil argent.

== Geography ==
A farming village situated in a meander of the river Seine, some 7 miles (11 km) southwest of Rouen, on the D 51 road.

== Population ==
Historical population

Year	Pop.	±% p.a.
1793	224	—
1821	189	−0.60%
1846	253	+1.17%
1872	188	−1.14%
1901	169	−0.37%
1926	132	−0.98%
1946	185	+1.70%
1962	206	+0.67%
1968	207	+0.08%

Year	Pop.	±% p.a.
1975	223	+1.07%
1982	278	+3.20%
1990	360	+3.28%
1999	352	−0.25%
2007	352	+0.00%
2012	378	+1.44%
2017	413	+1.79%
2023	399	−0.57%

Source: EHESS and INSEE (1968-2023)

== Places of interest ==
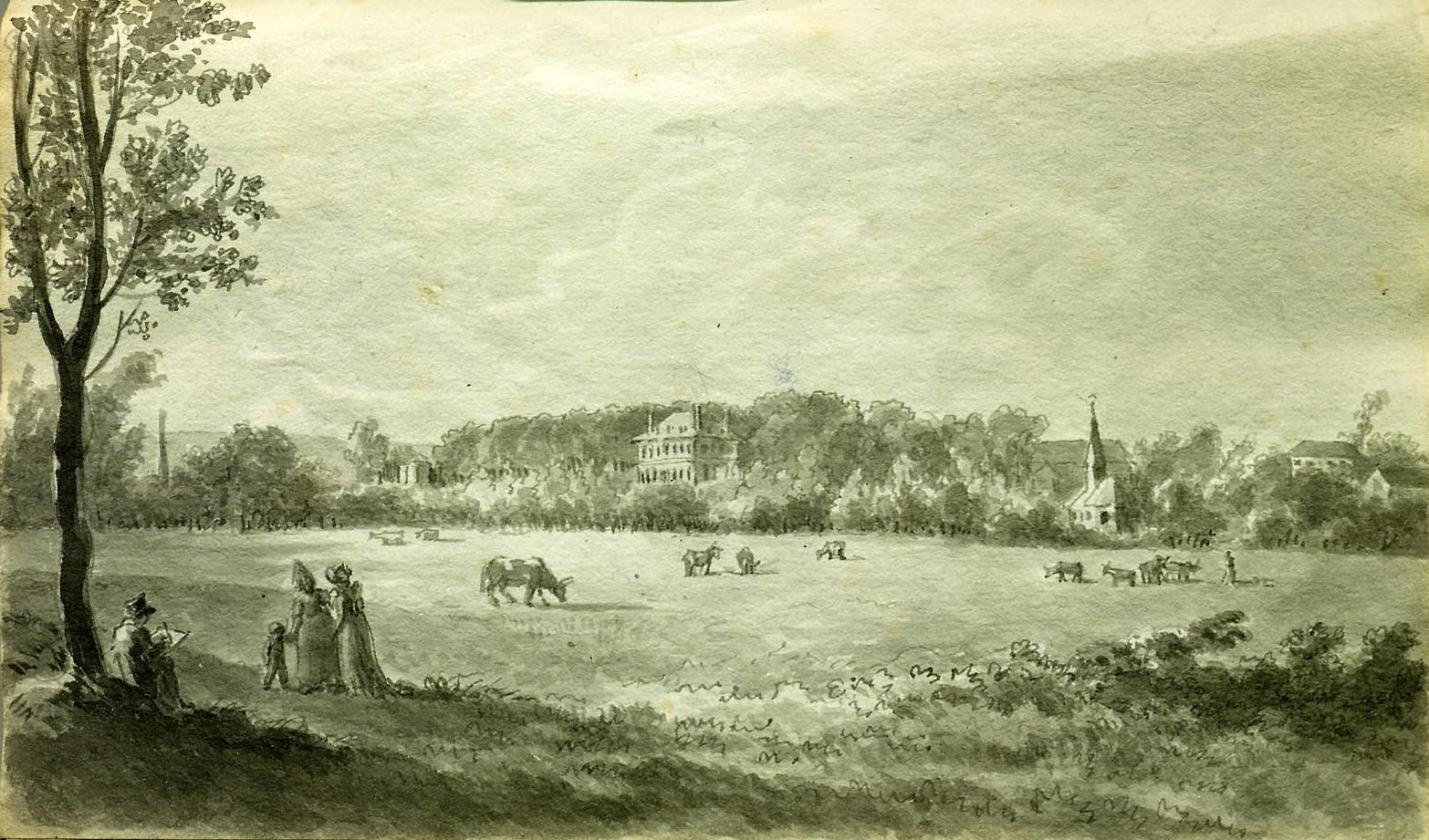
Hautot, by Constance de La Martel, 1806

- The church of Saint-Antoine-et-Saint-Thibauld, dating from the fifteenth century.
- Three nineteenth century châteaux.

== See also ==
- Communes of the Seine-Maritime department
