= Val-de-la-Haye =

- Commune
- Coat of arms
- Location of Val-de-la-Haye
- Location within France Location within Normandy
- Coordinates: 49°22′41″N 1°00′07″E
- Country: France
- Region: Normandy
- Department: Seine-Maritime
- Arrondissement: Rouen
- Canton: Canteleu
- Intercommunality: Métropole Rouen Normandie

Government
  - Mayor (2026–32): Pascal Delaporte
- Area^{1}: 10.16 km^{2} (3.92 sq mi)
- Elevation: 15 m (49 ft)
- Highest elevation: 119 m (390 ft)
- Lowest elevation: 2 m (6.6 ft)
- Population (2023): 689
  - Density: 67.8/km^{2} (176/sq mi)
- Time zone: UTC+01:00 (CET)
  - Summer (DST): UTC+02:00 (CEST)
- INSEE/Postal code: 76717 /76380
- ^{1} French Land Register data, which excludes lakes, ponds, glaciers > 1 km^{2} (0.386 sq mi or 247 acres) and river estuaries.

Val-de-la-Haye (French pronunciation: [val də la ɛ]) is a commune in the Seine-Maritime department in the Normandy region in north-western France.

== Geography ==
A forestry and light industrial village situated by the banks of the Seine, some 6 miles (9.7 km) southwest of Rouen on the D 51 road. A car ferry connects with the commune of Petit-Couronne on the opposite bank.

== Heraldry ==
Arms of Val-de-la-Haye	The arms of the commune of Val-de-la-Haye are blazoned : Per pale 1: gules, 2 demi-leopards issuant from the line of division and 2: azure, a boat proper issuant from sinister sailing on a base barry wavy azure and argent, and in chief an imperial French eagle Or grasping a lightning bolt argent; over the per pale line of division, a sword throughout argent garnished proper, the guard has argent blobs at the tips, and is charged with a lozenge argent charged with a Maltese cross; and the pommel is charged with a torteau [gules]; the entire shield fimbriated Or.

== Population ==
Historical population

Year	Pop.	±% p.a.
1793	775	—
1821	595	−0.94%
1846	519	−0.55%
1872	385	−1.14%
1901	359	−0.24%
1926	370	+0.12%
1946	582	+2.29%
1962	729	+1.42%
1968	754	+0.56%

Year	Pop.	±% p.a.
1975	669	−1.69%
1982	715	+0.95%
1990	805	+1.49%
1999	789	−0.22%
2007	746	−0.70%
2012	716	−0.82%
2017	710	−0.17%
2023	689	−0.50%

Source: EHESS and INSEE (1968-2023)

== Places of interest ==
- The church of St. Jean-Baptiste, dating from the twentieth century.
- Vestiges of the thirteenth-century Templars' Sainte-Vaubourg commandery.
- A commemorative stone column topped with a bronze eagle, built in 1846.

== See also ==
- Communes of the Seine-Maritime department
