= Canteleu =

- Commune
- Coat of arms
- Location of Canteleu
- Location within France Location within Normandy
- Coordinates: 49°26′28″N 1°01′34″E
- Country: France
- Region: Normandy
- Department: Seine-Maritime
- Arrondissement: Rouen
- Canton: Canteleu
- Intercommunality: Métropole Rouen Normandie

Government
  - Mayor (2026–32): Tom Delahaye
- Area^{1}: 17.61 km^{2} (6.80 sq mi)
- Elevation: 128 m (420 ft)
- Highest elevation: 138 m (453 ft)
- Lowest elevation: 2 m (6.6 ft)
- Population (2023): 14,402
  - Density: 817.8/km^{2} (2,118/sq mi)
- Time zone: UTC+01:00 (CET)
  - Summer (DST): UTC+02:00 (CEST)
- INSEE/Postal code: 76157 /76380
- ^{1} French Land Register data, which excludes lakes, ponds, glaciers > 1 km^{2} (0.386 sq mi or 247 acres) and river estuaries.

Canteleu (French pronunciation: [kɑ̃tlø]) is a commune in the Seine-Maritime department in the Normandy region in north-western France.

== Geography ==
A small town of forestry and light industry situated by the banks of the river Seine, just three kilometres (2 mi) northwest and over the river from the centre of Rouen, at the junction of the D 51, D 982 and the D 94 roads.

=== Heraldry ===
Arms of Canteleu	The arms of Canteleu are blazoned : Argent, a chevron gules between 3 trefoils vert.

== Population ==
Historical population
Year	Pop.	±% p.a.
1968	13,415	—
1975	14,174	+0.79%
1982	15,276	+1.08%
1990	16,090	+0.65%
1999	15,430	−0.46%
2007	14,430	−0.83%
2012	14,781	+0.48%
2017	14,181	−0.83%
2023	14,402	+0.26%
Source: INSEE

== Places of interest ==
- Saint-Martin's church, dating from the thirteenth century.
- The seventeenth century convent of Sainte-Barbe, built over a cave in the cliffs, overlooking the river.
- The Flaubert museum.
- The two churches of St. Pierre, at the hamlets of Bapeaume (1872) and Croisset.
- Vestiges of a 12th-century castle at Croisset.
- A Carthaginian column in the park.
- The sixteenth century Château des Deux-Lions.
- A turretted house at Dieppedalle.

== Notable people ==
- Gustave Flaubert (1821–1880) lived at the hamlet of Croisset for 40 years and died here.
- English painter Robert Henry Cheney (1801–1866) painted several views of and from here, including the watercolour Rouen-From the chateau de Cantelieu, July 19, 1842.

== Twin towns ==
- Buchholz in der Nordheide, Germany
- Wołów, Poland
- New Milton, England
- Kongoussi, Burkina Faso

== See also ==
- Communes of the Seine-Maritime department

== Bibliography ==
- Alice Lejard, Canteleu aux multiples facettes, 2000 ISBN 2-9516176-0-7
- Michel Giard, Hurler avec les loups à Canteleu, Éd. Charles Corlet, 2003 ISBN 2847060774
