= Saint-Pierre-de-Manneville =

- Commune
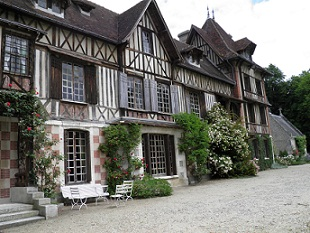
- The manor of Villers

- Coat of arms
- Location of Saint-Pierre-de-Manneville
- Location within France Location within Normandy
- Coordinates: 49°23′36″N 0°55′57″E
- Country: France
- Region: Normandy
- Department: Seine-Maritime
- Arrondissement: Rouen
- Canton: Canteleu
- Intercommunality: Métropole Rouen Normandie

Government
  - Mayor (2026–32): Nicolas Amice
- Area^{1}: 10.21 km^{2} (3.94 sq mi)
- Elevation: 6 m (20 ft)
- Highest elevation: 114 m (374 ft)
- Lowest elevation: 1 m (3.3 ft)
- Population (2023): 881
  - Density: 86.3/km^{2} (223/sq mi)
- Time zone: UTC+01:00 (CET)
  - Summer (DST): UTC+02:00 (CEST)
- INSEE/Postal code: 76634 /76113
- ^{1} French Land Register data, which excludes lakes, ponds, glaciers > 1 km^{2} (0.386 sq mi or 247 acres) and river estuaries.

Saint-Pierre-de-Manneville (French pronunciation: [sɛ̃ pjɛʁ də manvil]) is a commune in the Seine-Maritime department in the Normandy region in northern France.

== Geography ==
A village of forestry, farming and associated light industry situated in a meander of the Seine, some 7 miles (11 km) southwest of Rouen on the D67 road.

== Heraldry ==
Arms of Saint-Pierre-de-Manneville	The arms of Saint-Pierre-de-Manneville are blazoned : Or, a bend wavy azure between a bunch of grapes gules, slipped and leaved vert, and a fir tree eradicated vert, and on a chief gules, 3 angennes argent.

== Population ==
Historical population
Year	Pop.	±% p.a.
1968	442	—
1975	501	+1.81%
1982	571	+1.89%
1990	728	+3.08%
1999	774	+0.68%
2007	718	−0.93%
2012	758	+1.09%
2017	921	+3.97%
2023	881	−0.74%
Source: INSEE

== Places of interest ==
- The church of St. Pierre, dating from the sixteenth century.
- The chapel at Villiers, dating from the eighteenth century.
- The nineteenth-century chateau of BelleGarde.
- The manorhouse at Villers, built in timber and dating from the sixteenth century.
- Two mansions.

== See also ==
- Communes of the Seine-Maritime department
