= Maromme =

- Commune
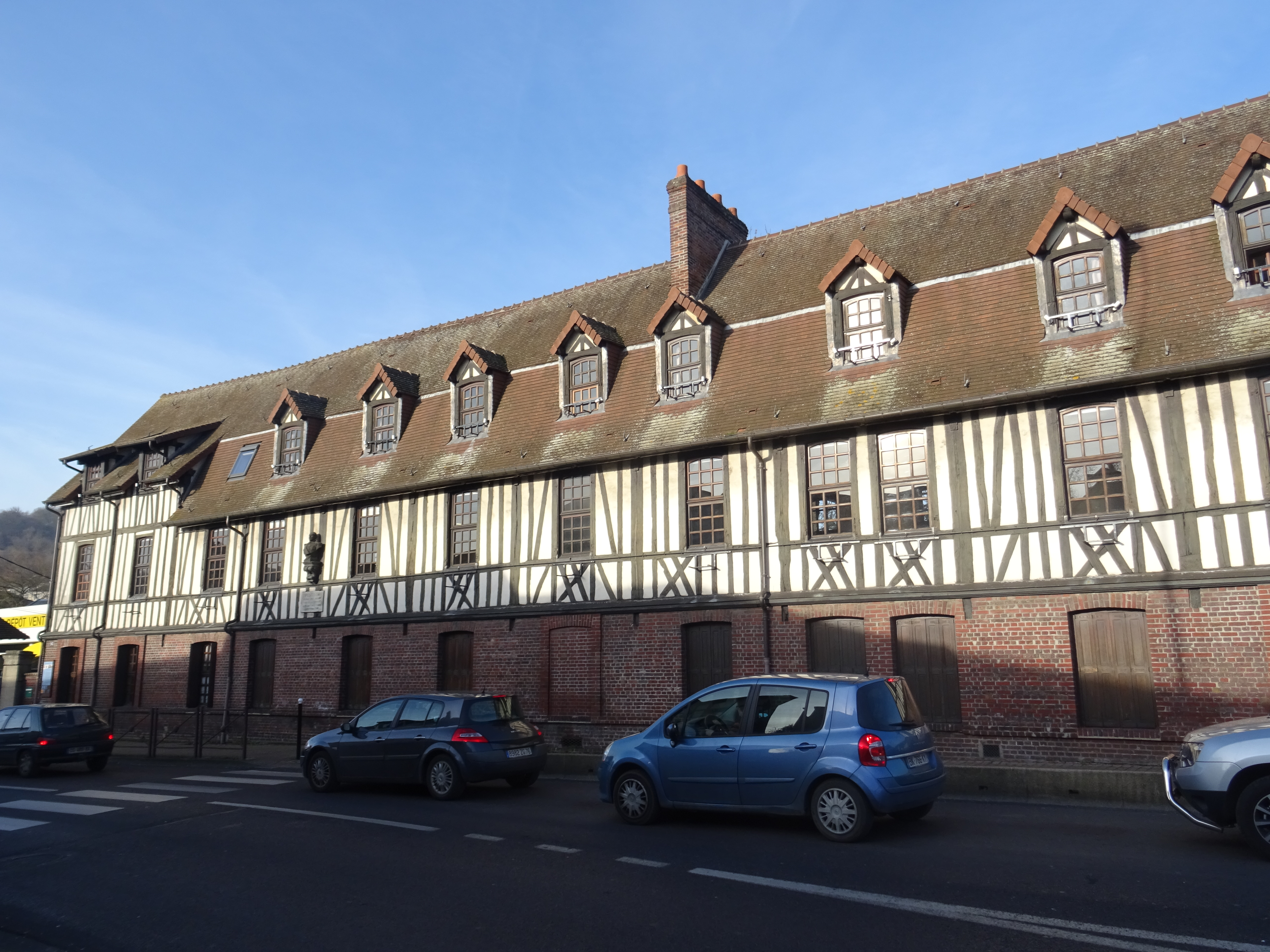
- Maison Pélissier in Maromme

- Coat of arms
- Location of Maromme
- Location within France Location within Normandy
- Coordinates: 49°28′57″N 1°02′34″E
- Country: France
- Region: Normandy
- Department: Seine-Maritime
- Arrondissement: Rouen
- Canton: Canteleu
- Intercommunality: Métropole Rouen Normandie

Government
  - Mayor (2026–32): David Lamiray
- Area^{1}: 4.01 km^{2} (1.55 sq mi)
- Elevation: 16 m (52 ft)
- Highest elevation: 137 m (449 ft)
- Lowest elevation: 11 m (36 ft)
- Population (2023): 10,957
  - Density: 2,730/km^{2} (7,080/sq mi)
- Time zone: UTC+01:00 (CET)
  - Summer (DST): UTC+02:00 (CEST)
- INSEE/Postal code: 76410 /76150
- ^{1} French Land Register data, which excludes lakes, ponds, glaciers > 1 km^{2} (0.386 sq mi or 247 acres) and river estuaries.

Maromme (French pronunciation: [maʁɔm]) is a commune in the Seine-Maritime department in the Normandy region in northern France.

== Geography ==
A suburban town of forestry and light industry situated by the banks of the Cailly, just 3 miles (4.8 km) northwest of Rouen city centre, at the junction of the D51, D56, D43 and the D6015 roads. SNCF operates a TER rail service here.

== Heraldry ==
Arms of Maromme	The arms of Maromme are blazoned : Per bend sinister 1: Gules, a beehive Or issuant from the line of partition(?); 2: Or, 3 chimneys issuant from 4 factory roofs gules; and on a chief vert, 3 bees Or.

== Population ==
Historical population
Year	Pop.	±% p.a.
1968	10,107	—
1975	11,622	+2.02%
1982	12,431	+0.97%
1990	12,744	+0.31%
1999	12,411	−0.29%
2007	11,819	−0.61%
2012	11,232	−1.01%
2017	10,908	−0.58%
2023	10,957	+0.07%
Source: INSEE

== Places of interest ==
- The church of St.Martin, dating from the nineteenth century.

== Sport ==
The commune has a football team, AL Deville-Maromme, who play at the Stade Paul Vauquelin.

== People with links to the commune ==
- Aimable Pélissier (1794–1864), Marshal of France, was born here
- Georges Chedanne (1861–1940), architect, was born here
- Georges Bradberry (1878–1959), artist, was born here

== Twin towns ==
- Norderstedt, Germany
- Signa, Italy
- Binche, Belgium
- Oadby and Wigston, England

== See also ==
- Communes of the Seine-Maritime department
