= Darnétal =

- Commune
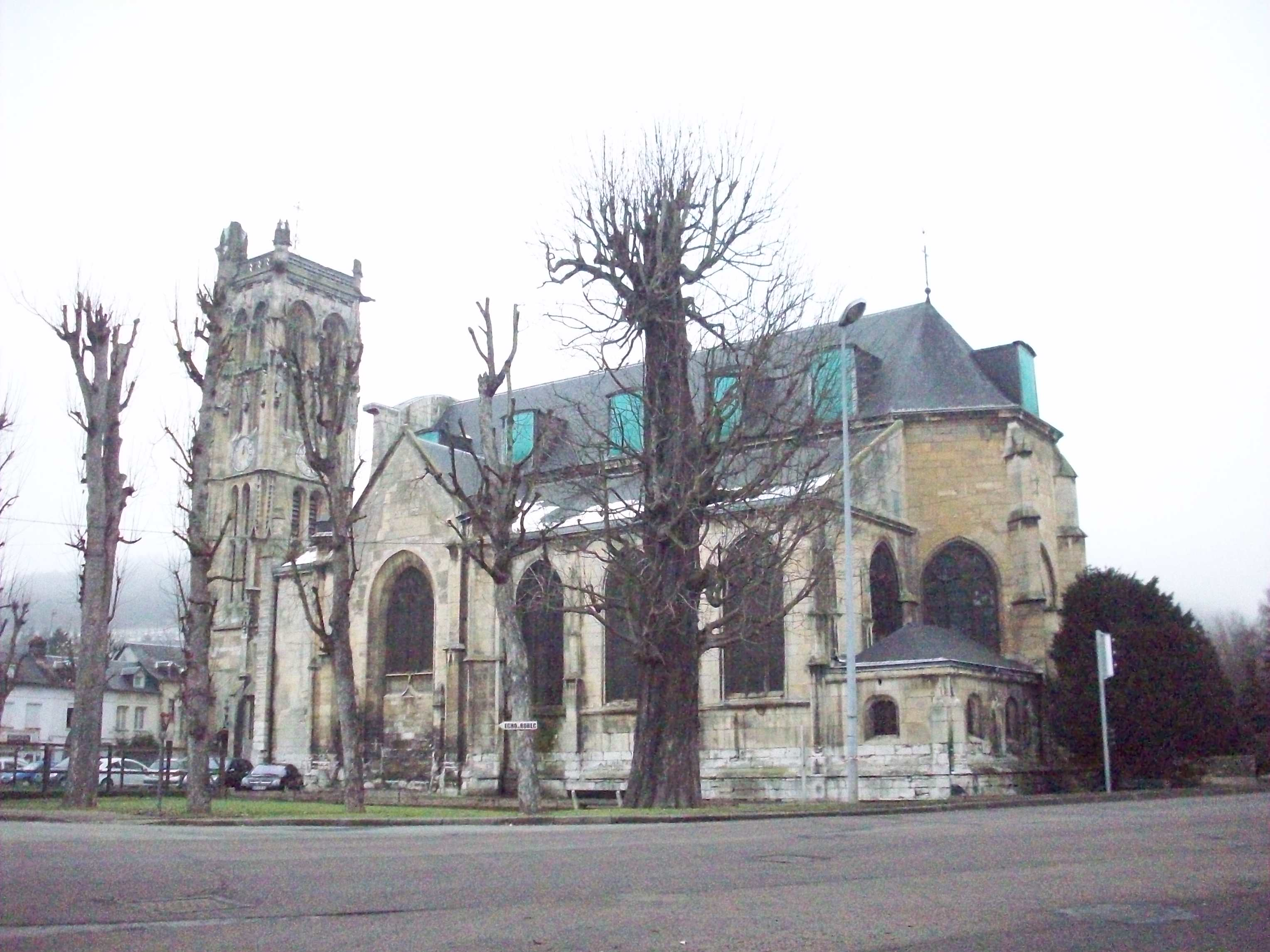
- The church of Carville

- Coat of arms
- Location of Darnétal
- Location within France Location within Normandy
- Coordinates: 49°26′43″N 1°09′07″E
- Country: France
- Region: Normandy
- Department: Seine-Maritime
- Arrondissement: Rouen
- Canton: Darnétal
- Intercommunality: Métropole Rouen Normandie

Government
  - Mayor (2020–2026): Christian Lecerf
- Area^{1}: 4.93 km^{2} (1.90 sq mi)
- Elevation: 22 m (72 ft)
- Highest elevation: 143 m (469 ft)
- Lowest elevation: 13 m (43 ft)
- Population (2023): 9,566
  - Density: 1,940/km^{2} (5,030/sq mi)
- Time zone: UTC+01:00 (CET)
  - Summer (DST): UTC+02:00 (CEST)
- INSEE/Postal code: 76212 /76160
- ^{1} French Land Register data, which excludes lakes, ponds, glaciers > 1 km^{2} (0.386 sq mi or 247 acres) and river estuaries.

Darnétal (French pronunciation: [daʁnetal]; Norman: Dernétal) is a commune in the Seine-Maritime department in the Normandy region in northern France.

== Geography ==
A light industrial suburban town surrounded by woodland, situated some 2 miles (3.2 km) east of the centre of Rouen at the junction of the D43, D15 and the N31 roads. Two small rivers flow through the town, the Robec and the Aubette.
SNCF operates a TER service, having a railway station in the town.

== Heraldry ==
Arms of Darnétal	The arms of Darnétal are blazoned : Gules, a fess wavy [river] between two gear wheels argent and, in base, a printers stamp between, to dexter a weaver's shuttle and its bobbin in saltire, and to sinister a ?linen? shuttle with its ?teasel? in saltire Or.

== Population ==
Historical population
Year	Pop.	±% p.a.
1968	11,062	—
1975	11,765	+0.88%
1982	10,081	−2.18%
1990	9,779	−0.38%
1999	9,225	−0.65%
2007	9,429	+0.27%
2012	9,418	−0.02%
2017	9,707	+0.61%
2023	9,566	−0.24%
Source: INSEE

== Places of interest ==
- The churches of St.Ouen and of St.Pierre, both dating from the sixteenth century.
- Traces of a feudal castle.
- A restored watermill.

== Notable people ==
- The activist René Valentin Binet, (1913–1957) was born here.
- Blessed Father Jacques Hamel (1930-2016), first priest to be killed by ISIL in Europe.

== See also ==
- Communes of the Seine-Maritime department
