= Sahurs =

- Commune
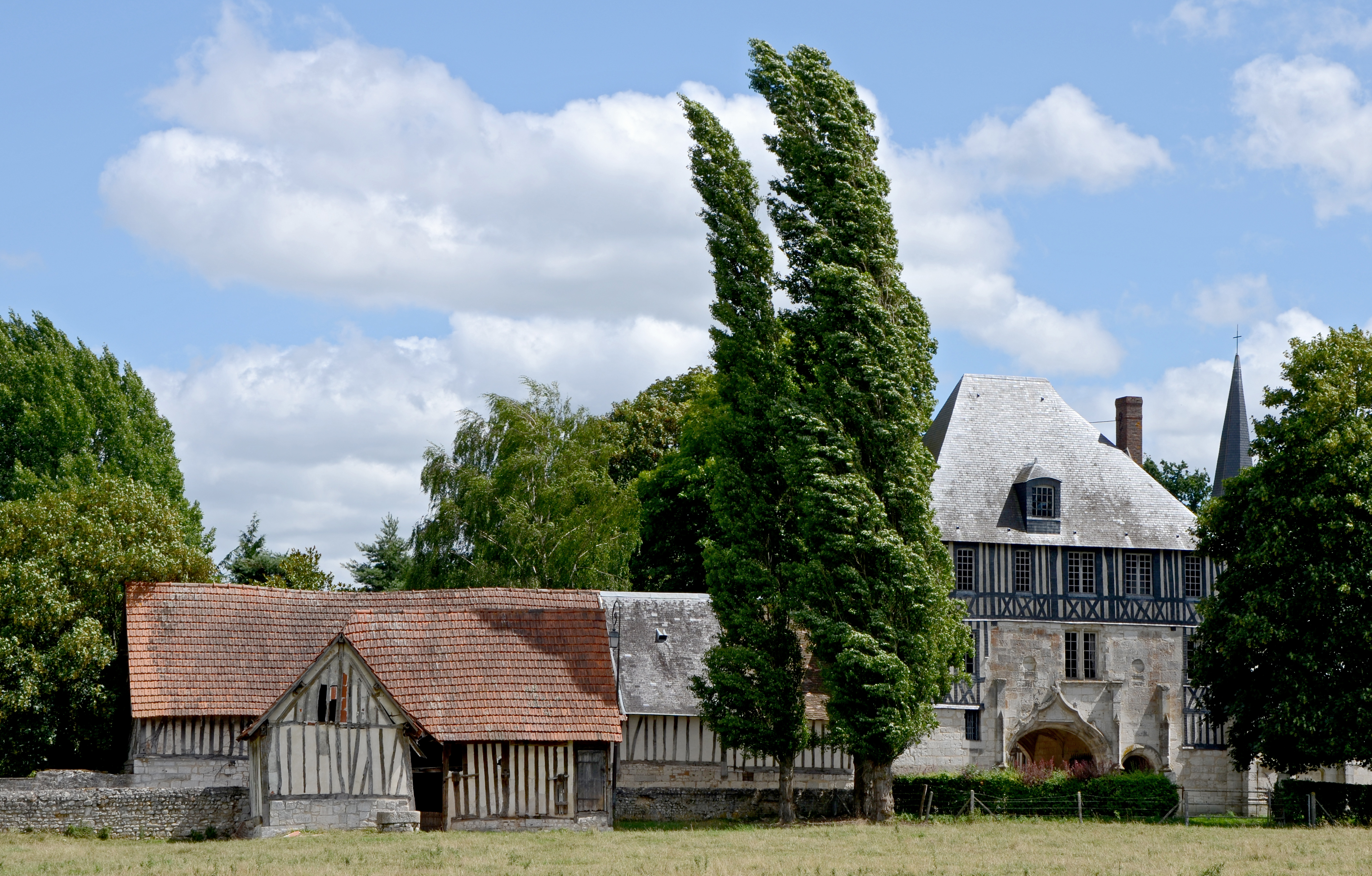
- The manor of Marbeuf in Sahurs
- Location of Sahurs
- Location within France Location within Normandy
- Coordinates: 49°21′34″N 0°56′39″E
- Country: France
- Region: Normandy
- Department: Seine-Maritime
- Arrondissement: Rouen
- Canton: Canteleu
- Intercommunality: Métropole Rouen Normandie

Government
  - Mayor (2026–32): Thierry Jouenne
- Area^{1}: 11.23 km^{2} (4.34 sq mi)
- Elevation: 8 m (26 ft)
- Highest elevation: 101 m (331 ft)
- Lowest elevation: 2 m (6.6 ft)
- Population (2023): 1,216
  - Density: 108.3/km^{2} (280.4/sq mi)
- Time zone: UTC+01:00 (CET)
  - Summer (DST): UTC+02:00 (CEST)
- INSEE/Postal code: 76550 /76113
- ^{1} French Land Register data, which excludes lakes, ponds, glaciers > 1 km^{2} (0.386 sq mi or 247 acres) and river estuaries.

Sahurs (French pronunciation: [sayʁ]) is a rural commune in the Seine-Maritime department in the Normandy region in northern France. Part of the Metropole Rouen Normandie, it is situated along the river Seine, about 15 kilometers southwest of Rouen.

== Geography ==
A village of forestry and farming situated inside a meander of the river Seine, some 8 miles (13 km) southwest of Rouen at the junction of the D5 and the D351 roads. A car ferry connects the commune with the south bank.

== Administration ==
Sahurs is governed by a municipal council led by mayor Thierry Jouenne, elected in 2020.

== Population ==
Historical population
| Year | Pop. | ±% p.a. |
|---|---|---|
| 1968 | 755 | — |
| 1975 | 788 | +0.61% |
| 1982 | 870 | +1.42% |
| 1990 | 1,008 | +1.86% |
| 1999 | 1,120 | +1.18% |
| 2007 | 1,320 | +2.08% |
| 2012 | 1,264 | −0.86% |
| 2017 | 1,226 | −0.61% |
| 2023 | 1,216 | −0.14% |
Source: INSEE

== Places of interest ==
- The church of St. Sauveur, dating from the eleventh century
- The sixteenth century Château de Soquence
- The manorhouse and chapel de Marbeuf, dating from the sixteenth century
- The Château de Trémauville

== Notable people ==
- Louis de Brézé, who built the Manoir de Marbeuf
- Anne of Austria, a benefactor of the chapel de Marbeuf

== See also ==
- Communes of the Seine-Maritime department
