= Moulineaux =

- Commune
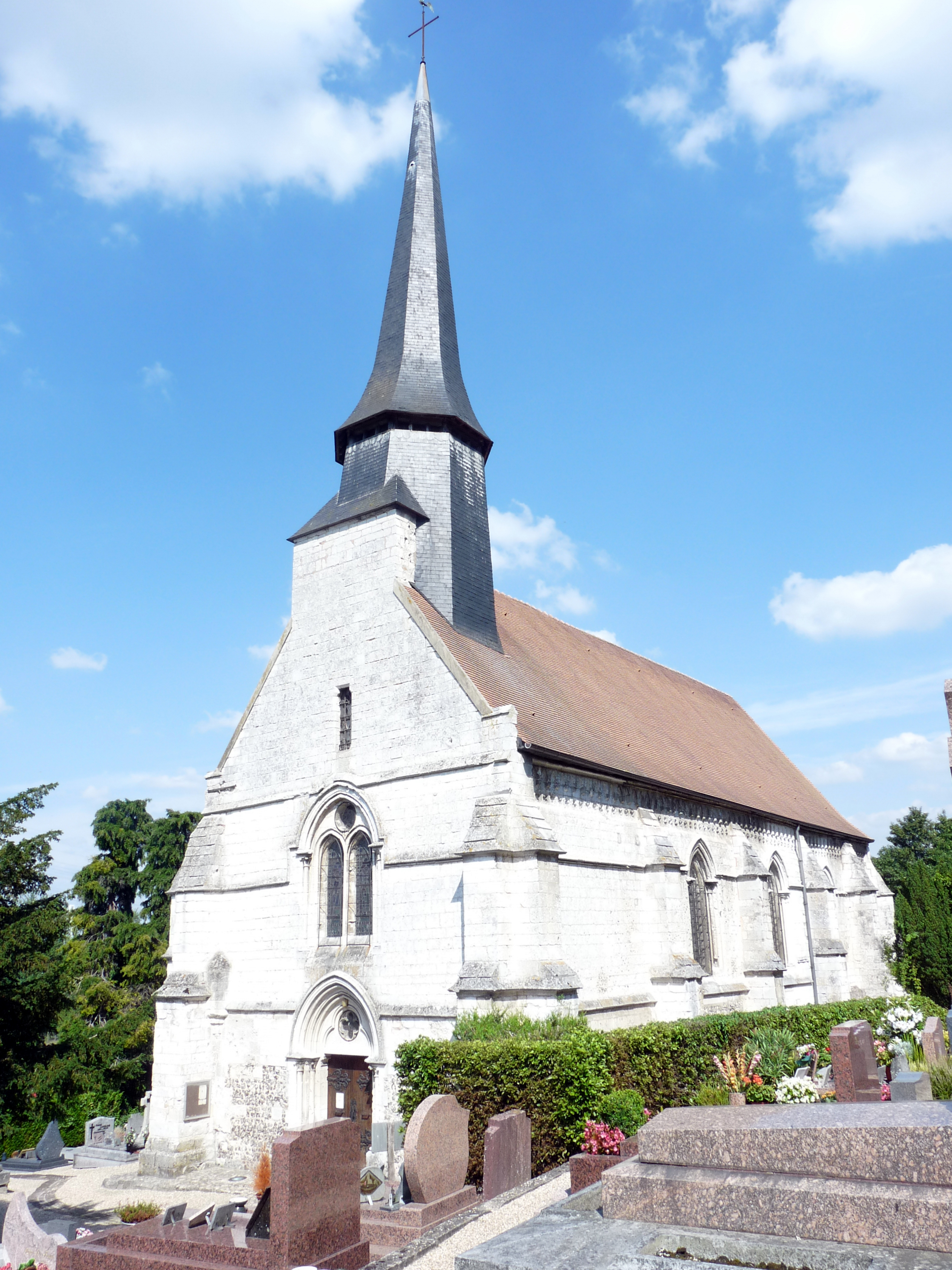
- The church in Moulineaux

- Coat of arms
- Location of Moulineaux
- Location within France Location within Normandy
- Coordinates: 49°20′35″N 0°58′00″E
- Country: France
- Region: Normandy
- Department: Seine-Maritime
- Arrondissement: Rouen
- Canton: Elbeuf
- Intercommunality: Métropole Rouen Normandie

Government
  - Mayor (2026–32): Frédéric Le Goff
- Area^{1}: 3.47 km^{2} (1.34 sq mi)
- Elevation: 6 m (20 ft)
- Highest elevation: 125 m (410 ft)
- Lowest elevation: 2 m (6.6 ft)
- Population (2023): 954
  - Density: 275/km^{2} (712/sq mi)
- Time zone: UTC+01:00 (CET)
  - Summer (DST): UTC+02:00 (CEST)
- INSEE/Postal code: 76457 /76530
- ^{1} French Land Register data, which excludes lakes, ponds, glaciers > 1 km^{2} (0.386 sq mi or 247 acres) and river estuaries.

Moulineaux (French pronunciation: [mulino]) is a commune in the Seine-Maritime department in the Normandy region in northern France.

== History ==
During the Franco-Prussian War of December 1870 - January 1871 its garrison fought off a siege by 20,000 Prussians led by Edwin von Manteuffel.

== Geography ==
The village of light industry and forestry situated by the banks of the river Seine, some 10 miles (16 km) southwest of Rouen at the junction of the D3, D64 and the D67 roads. The A13 autoroute passes through the commune's territory.

== Population ==
Historical population
Year	Pop.	±% p.a.
1968	843	—
1975	973	+2.07%
1982	838	−2.11%
1990	792	−0.70%
1999	890	+1.30%
2007	880	−0.14%
2012	929	+1.09%
2017	944	+0.32%
2023	954	+0.18%
Source: INSEE

== Places of interest ==
- The church of St. Jacques, dating from the thirteenth century.
- Remains of the eleventh-century castle of Robert le Diable, also housing a museum.
- The Caradas manorhouse and St. Jean's chapel at Fontaines.
- A sixteenth century chapel.
- The Château de La Vacherie, dating from the seventeenth century.

== See also ==
- Communes of the Seine-Maritime department
