= Ten Doesschate =

Ten Doesschate, (Ten) Doeschate or Ten Doeschot is a rather uncommon Dutch toponymic surname. The name derives from a farm named Doeschot near Goor in the province of Overijssel. Notable people with the surname include:

- Gezienus ten Doesschate (1885 - 1964), Dutch ophthalmologist, amateur painter and historian
- Johan Frederik ten Doesschate (1904 - 1964), Dutch business economist
- Jurriaan ten Doesschate (1912 – 1977), Dutch ophthalmologist and medical scientist
- Petra ten-Doesschate Chu (born 1942), Dutch art historian
- Ryan ten Doeschate (born 1980), Dutch cricketer
