= L'Auberge =

L'Auberge (French for "the inn") may refer to:

== Restaurants ==
- L'Auberge (restaurant), former Dutch restaurant with two Michelin stars
- L'Auberge de Cendrillon, restaurant in Disneyland Paris
- L'Auberge du Pont de Collonges, French restaurant with three Michelin stars, run by Paul Bocuse

== Films ==
- L'Auberge espagnole, 2002 French film
- L'Auberge du Bon Repos, 1903 French silent movie

== Other uses ==
- L'Auberge du Lac Resort, casino hotel in the United States
- Auberge rouge, French criminal case
- The Auberge of the Flowering Hearth, book by Roy Andries de Groot

== See also ==
- Auberge (disambiguation)
