= Petra ten-Doesschate Chu =

Dutch art historian (born 1942)

- Born: 15 October 1942 (age 84); Zeist, Netherlands
- Spouse: Fen-Dow Chu (m. 1971)
- Children: 4
- Awards: Guggenheim Fellowship (1986)

Academic background
- Education: University of Paris; University of Utrecht; Columbia University (PhD)
- Thesis: French Realism and the Dutch Masters: The Influence of Dutch Seventeenth-Century Painting on the Development of French Painting Between 1830 and 1870 (1972)
- Doctoral advisor: Theodore Reff; Allen Staley

Academic work
- Discipline: Art history
- Sub-discipline: Gustave Courbet
- Institutions: Seton Hall University

Petra ten-Doesschate Chu (born 15 October 1942) is a Dutch art historian based in the United States. A 1986 Guggenheim Fellow, she has written and edited several books, including Letters of Gustave Courbet (1992), The Popularization of Images (1994), The Most Arrogant Man in France (2007) and Qing Encounters (2015). She is a professor emeritus of art history and museum studies at the Seton Hall University College of Human Development Culture and Media.

== Early life and education ==
Petra ten-Doesschate was born on 15 October 1942 in Zeist, Netherlands; her father Jurriaan ten Doesschate was an ophthalmologist and her mother Lidy was a pediatrician. Her paternal grandfather Gezienus ten Doesschate was an ophthalmologist and art historian. While working as an au pair in Paris, she attended the University of Paris, where she obtained a diplôme supérieur in 1961. She then spent six years at the University of Utrecht, obtaining a doctoral degree there in 1967.

She decided to study in the United States after her father spent a year there as a visiting professor at the University of Michigan, and she wrote letters to New York University and Columbia University, the latter of which accepted her to their doctoral program. A 1967–1971 Columbia Noble Fellow, she obtained a PhD in fine arts in 1972; her dissertation French Realism and the Dutch Masters: The Influence of Dutch Seventeenth-Century Painting on the Development of French Painting Between 1830 and 1870 was supervised by Theodore Reff and Allen Staley.

While studying at Columbia, she worked as an assistant at Roy Andries de Groot's New York City office, with one of her jobs being describing meals for his food journalism pieces (de Groot was blind). She also worked as a local history researcher at the Museum of the City of New York and as a Dutch document translator at the New York State Education Department.

== Academic career ==
After working at the Institut Néerlandais from 1965 to 1972, she joined Seton Hall University in 1972 as an assistant professor, before being promoted to associate professor in 1977 and to full professor in 1980. She chaired Seton Hall's department of art and music from 1977 until 1998. She eventually retired and became professor emeritus. She and Barbara Cate co-founded Seton Hall's Master of Arts Program in Museum Professions.

As an academic, she specializes in 19th-century European art, especially in French art and the work of Gustave Courbet. She has written and edited several books, including The Popularization of Images (1994), The Most Arrogant Man in France (2007) and Qing Encounters (2015). She edited and translated a volume of Gustave Courbet's letters, published in 1992. She co-edited the Princeton Series in Nineteenth-Century Art, Culture, and Society from 1991 to 1997. She also authored a textbook named Nineteenth Century European Art, published by Prentice Hall in 2002, and wrote The Illustrated Bartsch's two-part volume on Vivant Denon. In 2008, she and Laurinda S. Dixon published a festschrift on Gabriel P. Weisberg.

She has also contributed to several exhibition catalogues, such as The Art of the July Monarchy (1990), French Paintings from the Musée Fabre, Montpellier (2003) and Anton Mauve 1838-1888 (2009). In addition to academic journals, she often contributed to magazines like Apollo and Arts Magazine.

In 1986, she was awarded a Guggenheim Fellowship. In 1999, she served as president of the Association of Historians of Nineteenth-Century Art. She was one of the co-founders of Nineteenth-Century Art Worldwide. She was also a 1990 Institute for Advanced Study Fellow, a 1994–1995 Metropolitan Museum of Art Whitney Art History Fellow, and 2013 Getty Research Institute Fellow. She won the 2015 College Art Association Distinguished Teaching of Art History Award.

== Personal life ==
In 1971, she married Fen-Dow Chu, a Taiwanese naval architect and son of artist I-Chao Chu. They have four children.

She lives in South Orange, New Jersey. She is fluent in Dutch, English, French and German, She also started learning Chinese after her marriage.

== Works ==
- French Realism and the Dutch Masters, Haentjens Dekker & Gumbert (1974)
- (ed.) Courbet in Perspective (1977)
- (with Gabriel P. Weisberg) The Realist Tradition: French Painting and Drawing 1830-1900 (1980)
- Dominique Vivant Denon (vol. 121 of The Illustrated Bartsch; 1985 and 1988)
- (ed. and trans.) Letters of Gustave Courbet (1992) (Note: Reviews:)
- (ed. with Gabriel P. Weisberg) The Popularization of Images: Visual Culture under the July Monarchy (1994) (Note: Reviews:)
- (with Jörg Zutter) Courbet: Artiste et promoteur de son oeuvre (1998, exhibition catalogue)
- Gustave Courbet: En Revoltör Lanserar Sitt Verk, National Museum (1999)
- Nineteenth-Century European Art (2002)
- Beyond the Frame: Impressionism Revisited: The Sculptures of J. Seward Johnson, Jr. (2003, Bullfinch)
- The Most Arrogant Man in France: Gustave Courbet and the Nineteenth-century Media Culture (2007) (Note: Reviews:)
- (ed. with Laurinda S. Dixon) Twenty-First Century Perspectives on Nineteenth-Century Art: Essays in Honor of Gabriel P. Weisberg (2008)
- (ed. with Ning Ding) Qing Encounters: Artistic Exchanges Between China and the West (2015)
