= Project Muse =

Online database of journals and ebooks

Project MUSE
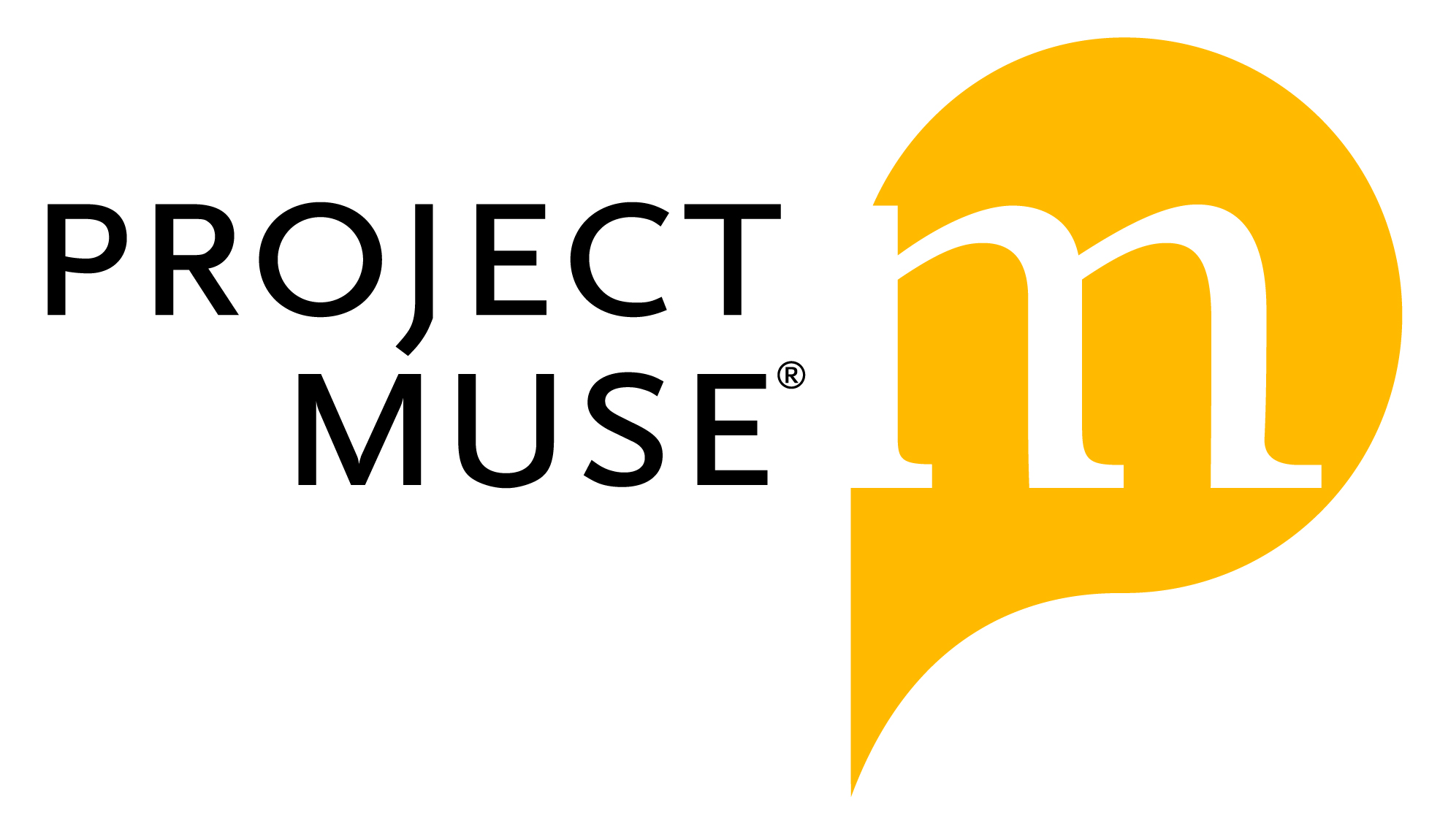
- Producer: Johns Hopkins University Press (United States)
- History: 1993; 33 years ago

Access
- Cost: Subscription

Coverage
- Record depth: Index, abstract and full text
- Format coverage: Books and journal articles

Links
- Website: muse.jhu.edu
- Title list(s): muse.jhu.edu/browse/titles

Project MUSE, a non-profit collaboration between libraries and publishers, is an online database of peer-reviewed academic journals and electronic books. As of 2024, Project Muse hosts over 800 journals and 100,000 books in digital humanities and social sciences, sourced from approximately 400 university presses and scholarly societies worldwide. It is an aggregator of digital versions of academic journals, all of which are free of digital rights management (DRM). It operates as a third-party acquisition service like EBSCO, JSTOR, OverDrive, and ProQuest. Project Muse's online journal collections are available on a subscription basis to academic, public, special, and school libraries.

== History ==
Project MUSE was founded in 1993 as a joint project between the Johns Hopkins University Press and the Milton S. Eisenhower Library at the Johns Hopkins University. With grants from the Andrew W. Mellon Foundation and the National Endowment for the Humanities, Project MUSE was launched online alongside the JHU Press Journals in 1995. In January 2012, MUSE launched its eBook Collections on the platform in collaboration with the University Press Content Consortium (UPCC), fully integrating them for search and discovery alongside its established journal collections.

Project MUSE announced in 2023 the launch of its Subscribe to Open (S2O) program, an open access initiative launched in 2025. This program allows participating journals to make their content freely available to all readers if a minimum subscription revenue threshold is met during the year. In 2024, Project MUSE said it will continue to serve libraries worldwide with access to a wide range of humanities and social science research materials, including thousands of open access books and several open access journals.

== Journals ==
Project MUSE offers tiered-pricing structures to meet budgetary and research needs of subscribing institutions. Project Muse is also the sole source of full-text versions of journal titles from a number of university presses and scholarly societies.

== Books ==
Supported by two grants from the Andrew W. Mellon Foundation, The University Press e-book Consortium (UPeC) emerged in 2009 to explore the feasibility of, and later develop, a university press-based e-book initiative that would balance the interests of both the publishing and library communities. In Spring 2011, UPeC announced its partnership with Project MUSE, and the University Press Content Consortium (UPCC) Book Collections on Project Muse was established. Launched in January 2012, the UPCC Book Collections consist of thousands of peer-reviewed book titles from major university presses and related scholarly publishers. Book collections are fully integrated with MUSE's electronic journal collections, allowing users to search across books and journals simultaneously or limit searches by content type. In 2016, it launched an initiative to create an open access platform that also digitized out-of-print scholarly books under the effort called MUSE Open.

== See also ==
- Aluka
- Artstor
- ArXiv
- Digital preservation
- Japanese Historical Text Initiative
- List of academic databases and search engines
