= Derborence (novel) =

1934 French-language novel

Derborence is a French-language novel by Swiss writer Charles-Ferdinand Ramuz that was first published in 1934 and for which two English translations have been published. It is a love story set in the Alps, against the backdrop of a natural disaster.

== Background ==
Derborence is a novel by Charles-Ferdinand Ramuz, a francophone Swiss writer who was born and lived for most of his life in the Swiss Canton of Vaud. It was first published in 1934. In a review of the first published English translation of Derborence, entitled When the mountain fell, The New York Times wrote that Ramuz "has long been recognized in France, as well as in his native Switzerland, as a writer of stature: in 1945 he was a contender for the Nobel Prize in Literature".

Derborence was described by the Macmillan Guide to Modern World Literature in its section on Ramuz, as the "most fully satisfying of his twenty-two novels".

In Francophone Literatures: An Introductory Survey Belinda Jack wrote of the post-World War One phase of Ramuz's writing career, "The two great texts are La Grande peur dans la montagne (1926) and Derborence (1934). Mystical, lyrical, and noble, Ramuz transformed the roman rustique into a major genre."

Derborence tells the story of a herdsman who is buried alive when a mountain falls on the summer village he temporarily inhabits. The novel was inspired by real events as recounted by a pastor from the Vaud named Philippe Bridel, in 1786. On 23 September 1714, a section of the Diablerets massif, located in the neighbouring canton to the Vaud, the Valais, collapsed following an earthquake two years earlier. The resulting landslide destroyed 50 chalets and killed an estimated 14 people, along with many cattle, goats and sheep. Mountain pastures disappeared under a carpet of boulders, streams and rivers were diverted from their course and new lakes were formed.

== Plot ==
As is the custom in the Swiss Alps around midsummer, Antoine Pont and his uncle by marriage, Séraphin, have taken their cows up into the mountains in search of fresh pasture. It quickly becomes apparent that Antoine is bored and pining for Thérèse, his wife of two months. One night, a landslide crashes down on the summer village, apparently killing Antoine and Séraphin along with many other herdsmen.

When news of the disaster reaches the village from which Antoine and his uncle hail, its inhabitants are plunged into mourning. Thérèse learns of Antoine’s fate just as she discovers that she is pregnant. The thought that her child will be born an orphan fills her with despair. Her mother, Philomena, tries in vain to comfort her, while mourning the loss of her brother Séraphin.

Seven weeks and a day after the landslide, Antoine emerges from the rock that, by a stroke of luck, buried him without killing him. When he tries to return to his village, however, he is mistaken for a ghost. He manages to persuade Thérèse that he is flesh and blood, but when he learns that Séraphin perished in the disaster, he refuses to believe it. Convinced that his uncle is still alive and merely trapped beneath the boulders, as he was, Antoine decides to return to the site of the landslide to rescue Séraphin. When Thérèse discovers that her husband has left the village, she realises what he intends to do and goes after him, hoping to convince him to return to the world of the living. The novel ends with their confrontation in the unrecognisable landscape of the collapsed mountain, during which she wins him round.

== Adaptations ==
Derborence has been adapted for cinema. The eponymous French-Swiss film directed by Francis Reusser appeared in 1985 and was entered into the 1985 Cannes Film Festival.

== Translations ==
- Spinney, Laura (2018). Derborence: Where the devils came down. London, Melbourne, New York: Skomlin Press.
- Scott, Sarah Fisher (1947). When the mountain fell. New York: Pantheon Books.

== See also ==
- Swiss literature
- 1927 Gottfried-Keller-Preis
- 1936 Schiller Prize
