= Derborence (film) =

1985 film

- Directed by: Francis Reusser
- Written by: Francis Reusser; Christiane Grimm; Jacques Baynac
- Based on: Derborence by Charles-Ferdinand Ramuz
- Starring: Isabel Otero; Jacques Penot; Maria Machado
- Cinematography: Emmanuel Machuel
- Edited by: Francis Reusser; Christine Benoît
- Release date: 1985
- Running time: 102 minutes
- Countries: Switzerland; France
- Language: French

Derborence is a 1985 French-Swiss film directed by Francis Reusser, adapted from Charles-Ferdinand Ramuz’s novel, about a young wife whose husband is presumed dead after a mountain landslide. The film was screened in competition at the 1985 Cannes Film Festival, was also shown at festivals including Montreal and Locarno, and won the César Award for Best French-Language Film in 1986.

== Synopsis ==
Antoine and Thérèse are newly married when Antoine goes with Séraphin to the alpine pasture. When a landslide is believed to have killed everyone on the mountain, Thérèse, who is pregnant, struggles to come to terms with the loss. Antoine later returns alive, but his reappearance unsettles the village. Believing that Séraphin may still be alive, he goes back into the mountains, and Thérèse follows him.

== Cast ==
The cast includes:

- Isabel Otero as Thérèse
- Jacques Penot as Antoine
- Maria Machado as Aline, Thérèse's mother
- Jean-Marc Bory as Nendaz
- Bruno Cremer as Séraphin

== Production ==
The film was adapted from Charles-Ferdinand Ramuz’s 1934 novel of the same name.

== Reception ==
=== Awards ===
The film won the César Award for Best French-Language Film in 1986.

=== Critical response ===
Filmdienst described the film as a mythical story of romantic love, but criticised its superficial widescreen imagery and loud effects. Filmbulletin argued that its form and content were out of sync, and criticised Reusser’s emphasis on technique and effects over the story itself.

== Digitisation ==
The film was digitised in 2020 by the Cinémathèque suisse.

== Festival screenings ==
The film was screened in competition at the 1985 Cannes Film Festival. That year, it was also shown at the Montreal World Film Festival, the Locarno Film Festival, and the Annecy Italian Film Festival. It was later screened at the Solothurn Film Festival in 1986 and at the 74th Locarno Film Festival in 2021.
