= James Whitall (writer) =

American translator

- Born: April 8, 1888; Philadelphia, Pennsylvania
- Died: March 23, 1954 (aged 65); Darlington, Maryland
- Occupation: Writer (translator)
- Spouse: Mildred Mason Smith (m. 1911)
- Relatives: Logan Pearsall Smith (cousin)
- Writing career
- Period: 20th century
- Genre: French translation

James Whitall (April 8, 1888 – March 23, 1954) was an American author and translator.

== Biography ==
Whitall was born in Philadelphia, Pennsylvania, the son of John Mickle Whitall and Margaret Haines Bacon. He married Mildred Mason Smith in 1911, and the couple had two sons.

He graduated from Haverford College. Afterwards he travelled to England where he spent 14 years living in London. While there he became close friends with other writers such as Virginia Woolf, George Moore, and his cousin, Logan Pearsall Smith. He returned to America and wrote an autobiography based on his stay in England called The English Years.

In addition to this book, he translated about 25 books from French to English.

Whitall died on March 22, 1954, in Havre de Grace, Maryland. His papers and manuscripts are stored at Bryn Mawr College.

== Works ==
=== Translations ===
- Poems of Leonidas of Tarentum (1915), by Leonidas
- The Reign of the Evil One (1917), Le règne de l'esprit malin by Charles Ferdinand Ramuz
- Chinese Lyrics from the Book of Jade (1918), Pih yuh she shoo translated from Chinese to French by Judith Gautier
- People (1921), People by Pierre Hamp
- Daughters of Fire: Sylvie-Emilie-Octavie (1922), Sylvie by Gérard de Nerval
- The Kiss to the Leper (1923), Le Baiser Au Lépreux by François Mauriac
- Kyra Kyralina (1926), Kyra Kyralina by Panait Istrati
- The Abandoned Wood (1936), by Monique Saint-Hélier
- Rodin (1937), Rodin by Judith Cladel
- The Thought Reading Machine (1938), by André Maurois
- Cloudy trophy; the romance of Victor Hugo (1938), by Léon Daudet
- The Art of Living (1940), Un art de vivre by André Maurois
- Michelangelo (1940), Michelangelo by Marcel Brion
- Then shall the dust return (1941), Varouna by Julien Green
- Saint Anthony of the Desert (1954), Saint Antoine du désert by Henri Queffélec

=== By Whitall ===
- The English Years (1936)
