= William G. Bowen =

American economist and academic administrator

17th President of Princeton University
- In office 1972–1988
- Preceded by: Robert F. Goheen
- Succeeded by: Harold T. Shapiro

Personal details
- Born: October 6, 1933 Cincinnati, Ohio, U.S.
- Died: October 20, 2016 (aged 83) Princeton, New Jersey, U.S.
- Spouse: Mary Ellen Bowen
- Children: 2
- Education: Denison University (BA); Princeton University (PhD)

William Gordon Bowen (/ˈboʊən/ BOH-ən; October 6, 1933 – October 20, 2016) was an American academic who served as the president emeritus of The Andrew W. Mellon Foundation, serving as its president from 1988 to 2006. From 1972 until 1988, he was the president of Princeton University. Bowen founded the digital library JSTOR.

== Early life ==
Bowen was born on October 6, 1933, in Cincinnati, Ohio. He was the son of Albert and Bernice Bowen. Albert Bowen was a calculator salesman and Bernice Bowen worked as a dorm mother at the University of Cincinnati. Bowen graduated from Wyoming High School. He attended Denison University, where he played championship tennis and was initiated into the Sigma Chi fraternity. He graduated from Denison in 1955 and from Princeton University in 1958, where he earned a PhD.

== Career ==
Bowen joined the Princeton faculty in 1958, specializing in labor economics. In 1967 he became the university's provost, and served as the seventeenth president of the university from 1972 to 1988. In 1988, Bowen left Princeton to become president of The Andrew W. Mellon Foundation, where he created a research program to investigate doctoral education, collegiate admissions, independent research libraries, and charitable nonprofits in order to ensure that the Andrew W. Mellon Foundation's grants would be well-informed and more effective.

William Bowen was also partially responsible for JSTOR, the Mellon International Dunhuang Archive, ARTstor, and Ithaka Harbors, Inc.

Bowen authored 19 books, including the Grawemeyer Award-winning The Shape of the River: Long-Term Consequences of Considering Race in College and University Admissions (co-authored with Derek Bok). One of his books, Equity and Excellence in American Higher Education (2005), was coauthored with Eugene M. Tobin and Martin A. Kurzweil. Bowen's study of graduation rates at public universities in the United States culminated in the book Crossing the Finish Line: Completing College at America's Public Universities that was coauthored with Matthew M. Chingos and Michael S. McPherson. He also wrote (with James Shulman) The Game of Life: College Sports and Educational Values (Princeton University Press, 2001).

Duke University President Richard H. Brodhead appointed him and Julius L. Chambers to evaluate the performance of Duke University's administration in handling the 2006 lacrosse team case.

Bowen's input helped then Williams College president Morton Schapiro decide to become Northwestern University president in 2009. Later, Schapiro said that Bowen was his "most trusted academic advisor and mentor.

Bowen died on October 20, 2016, fourteen days after his 83rd birthday, in Princeton, New Jersey, United States. He is buried in the Presidents' Plot at the Princeton Cemetery.

== Positions held ==
- Founding chairman of the Board of Ithaka.
- Trustee on the Board of the Trust Committee that oversaw the Rockefeller family trusts.
- Served on the following boards: JSTOR, ARTstor, Ithaka, Board of Overseers of Teachers Insurance and Annuity Association and College Retirement Equities Fund. Former board member of American Express, Merck & Co, Inc., and the University Corporation for Advanced Internet Development. Advisory board member of CollegeSource.
- Former professor of economics and public affairs at Princeton University.

== Awards and recognition ==
Bowen was elected to the American Academy of Arts and Sciences in 1973 and a member of the American Philosophical Society in 1978.

In 2013, he received a 2012 National Humanities Medal from President Barack Obama.

In 2008, he received the José Vasconcelos World Award of Education for his lifetime's work creating educational opportunities.

In 2001, he received the University of Louisville Grawemeyer Award for his book written with Derek Bok, The Shape of the River: Long-Term Consequences of Considering Race in College and University Admissions.

== See also ==
- Baumol's cost disease

== Notes ==
Academic offices
Preceded by Robert F. Goheen	President of Princeton University; 1972–1988	Succeeded by Harold T. Shapiro
Preceded by John Edward Sawyer	President of Andrew W. Mellon Foundation; 1988–2006	Succeeded by Don Michael Randel
