= Lycée Pierre-Corneille =

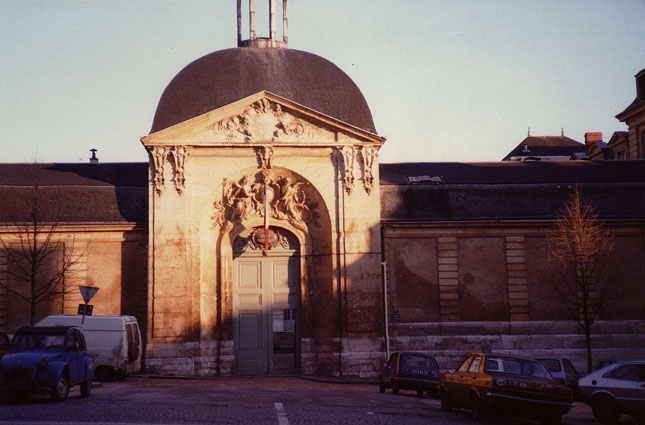

Location
- 4 rue du Maulévrier; 76000 Rouen; France
- Coordinates: 49.445250°N 1.100477°E

Information
- Type: Lycée
- Established: 1593; 433 years ago
- Founder: Archbishop of Rouen, Charles, Cardinal de Bourbon
- Head teacher: Gérard Thiébaud (Since 2011)
- Staff: circa 160
- Enrollment: circa 1600

The Lycée Pierre-Corneille (French pronunciation: [lise pjɛʁ kɔʁnɛj]; also known as the Lycée Corneille) is a state secondary school located in the city of Rouen, France.

Founded by the Jesuits in 1593, the school was secularized following the 1905 French law on the Separation of the Churches and the State, and is today non-religious and governed by the French Ministry of Education.

The school adopted the name of the playwright Pierre Corneille in 1873, and was classified as a national heritage site in December 1985.

== Origins ==
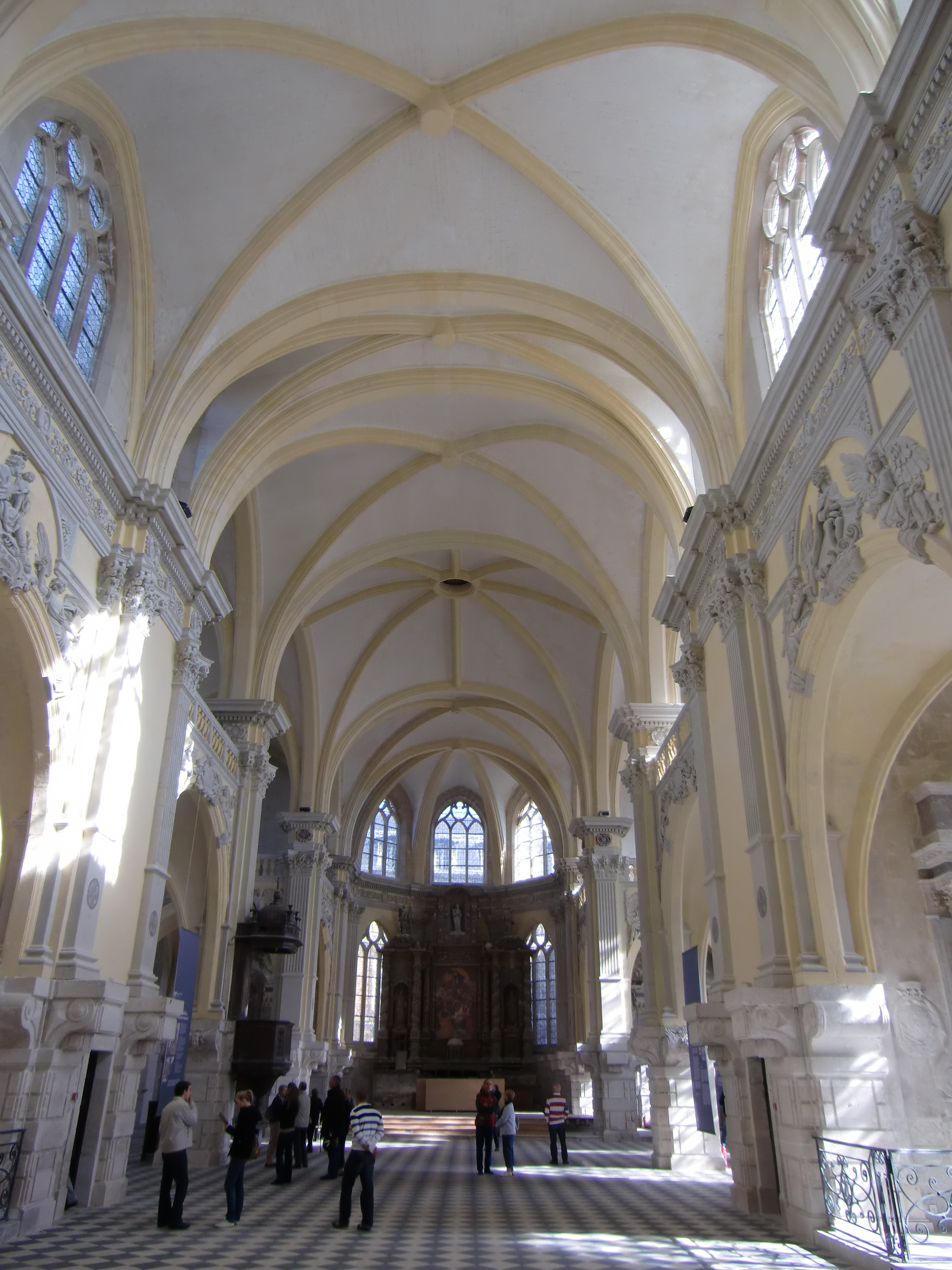
Nave of the former chapel, today an auditorium.

The Protestant Reformation in the 16th century inspired the Archbishop of Rouen, Charles, Cardinal de Bourbon, to create a school to educate the children of the aristocracy and bourgeoisie in accordance with the purest doctrinal principles of Roman Catholicism. The school opened in 1593, run by the Jesuits and known initially as the Collège de Bourbon.

From 1595 to 1604, teaching ceased because of Jesuit expulsions. Between 1614 and 1631, the gatehouse and chapel were built. By 1662, the lycée taught two thousand pupils.

The chapel was opened in 1631, although the foundation stone was laid in 1614 by Marie de Médicis, the widow of King Henri IV of France. The chapel combines both late gothic and classical architectural styles in its 52-meter nave. It became a listed building in 1908.

In 1762, the school became known as the Collège Royal after the Jesuits had been expelled from France. After the French Revolution, influenced by the ideas of the Age of Enlightenment, the school became associated with the 'Ecole Centrale'; the study of humanities was reduced in favour of a broader-based curriculum.

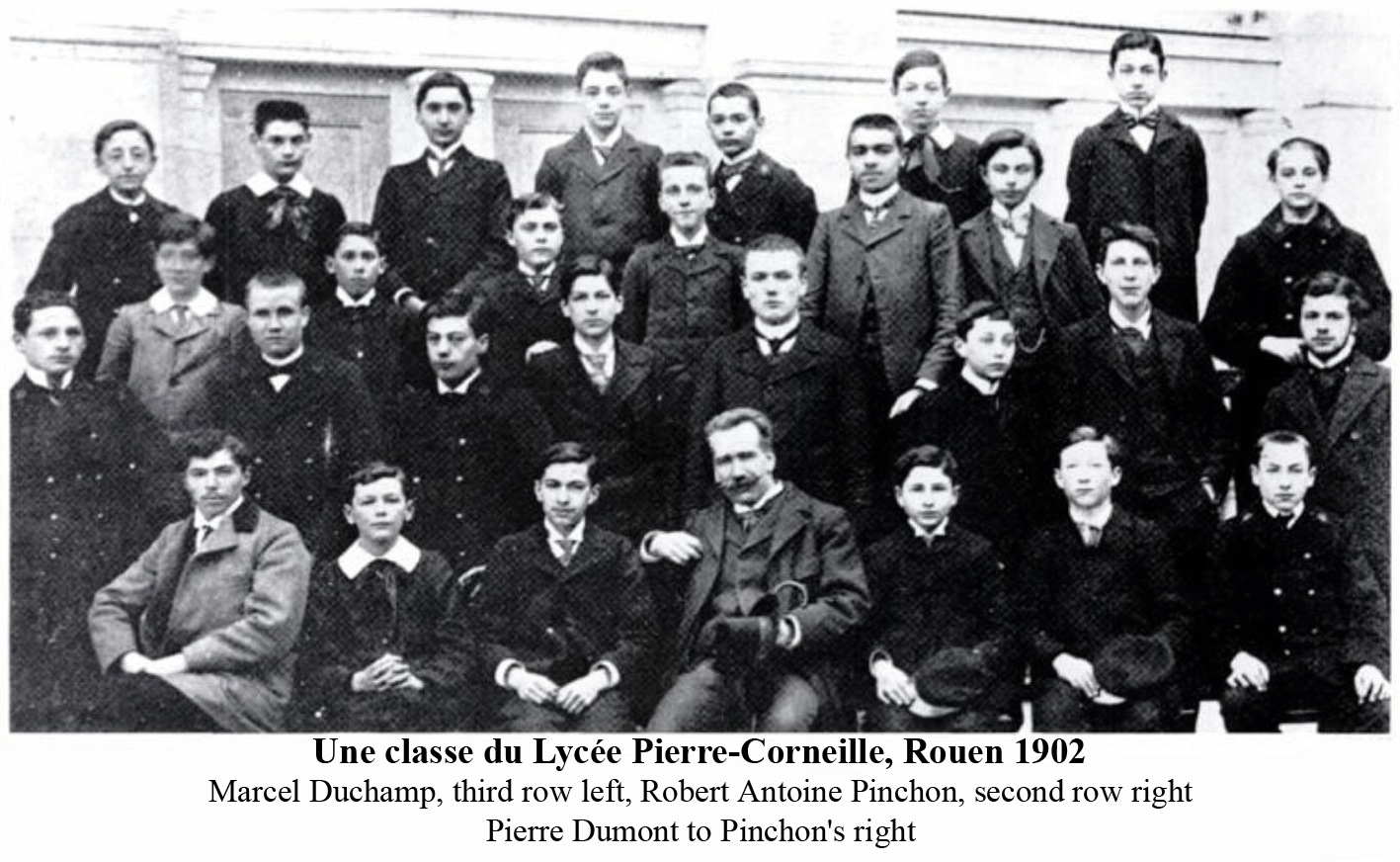
A class at the Lycée Pierre-Corneille, 1902. Artists Robert Antoine Pinchon (second row, right) and Marcel Duchamp (third row, left, out of focus). On Pinchon's right is very likely Pierre Dumont

After 1803 it became known as the 'Lycée Impérial' and taught humanities and mathematics following the principles and discipline of the Napoleonic Code. Successful students were awarded the Baccalauréat and subjects increased to include languages and Natural Sciences. The school then developed a two-year 'post baccalaureate' curriculum that enabled entry to the Grandes écoles.

In 1873, the Lycée was renamed 'Lycée Pierre-Corneille' in honour of the alumnus, the 17th century writer and academic, Pierre Corneille. At this time the petit lycée was added for younger pupils. In 1890, the sports club Les Francs Joueurs was founded.

Since 1918 the school has run a Norwegian 'college' that houses typically twenty-four boys for three years each. This was developed as an international peace-building initiative after World War I. In 2018, Queen Sonja of Norway visited the school to mark the centenary of the scheme, with Brigitte Macron and Rolf Einar Fife.

During World War I, it served as a military hospital. In World War II, it was commandeered by the German army, and was then bombed in September 1942 and on April 19, 1944.

Today it educates students in preparation for university and Grandes écoles.

== People ==
=== Alumni ===
- Jules Adeline, engraver
- Louis Anquetin, painter
- Jean-Jacques Antier, journalist and writer
- Reynold Arnould, painter
- Nicolas Bazire, businessman
- Jacques-Henri Bernardin de Saint-Pierre
- Antoine Blondin, writer
- Emile Blondel, scientist
- Pierre Bourguignon
- Armand Carrel
- René-Robert Cavelier, Sieur de La Salle
- Claude Chappe
- Patrick Chesnais, actor and director
- Ernest Conseil, biologist
- Pierre Corneille, writer and academic
- Thomas Corneille, writer and academic
- Camille Corot
- Léon Coutil
- Michel Danino
- Alfred Darcel
- Patrick Dehornoy, mathematician
- Eugène Delacroix, painter
- André Derocque
- Descroizille scientist
- Auguste Dorchain
- Georges Dubosc, journalist
- Marcel Duchamp
- Édouard Dujardin, writer
- Pierre-Louis Dulong scientist
- Pierre Dumont
- Marcel Dupré, organist
- Charles Féré, Doctor of medicine
- Gustave Flaubert, writer
- Bernard Le Bouyer de Fontenelle, writer and academic
- Henri Gadeau de Kerville, naturalist
- Dominique Gambier, politician
- Pierre Giffard, journalist, editor
- Alain Lebaube, writer
- Maurice Leblanc, writer
- Jean Lecanuet, politician
- Maurice Louvrier, artist painter
- André Marie, politician
- Émile Masqueray, anthropologist and ethnologist
- Guy de Maupassant, writer
- André Maurois, writer
- Jean-Luc Mélenchon, politician
- Paul Marie Mirouel, army officer
- Théodore Monod
- Charles Muller (1877-1914), journalist and writer
- Charles Nicolle, doctor physician
- Marcel Nicolle
- Farid Paya, Film director
- Thomas Pesquet, astronaut 2009
- Robert Antoine Pinchon, artist-painter
- Jean Prévost
- Jean-Baptiste Prévost, President of UNEF
- Torstein Raaby, Norwegian telegrapher, resistance fighter and explorer.
- André Renaudin
- Jacques Rivette, Director
- Jean Rochefort, actor
- Bertrand Serlet, engineer
- Léon de Vesly, archeologist
- Karin Viard, actress
- Jacques Villon, artist
- Francis Yard
- Étienne Wolff
- Rachid Yazami
- Philippe Zacharie

=== Teachers ===
- Théodore Bachelet (1847–1873)
- Léon Brunschvicg (1895–1900)
- Camille Cé (1878–1959)
- Camille Lebossé (1934–1936)
- Émile Durand (1937–?)
- Émile Chartier
- Bernard Pottier
- Jacques Bouteloup
- Gérard Simon (1964–1988)
- Mongo Beti (1966–1994)

== See also ==
- List of Jesuit sites
