= The Auberge of the Flowering Hearth =

1973 non-fiction food book by Roy Andries De Groot

- Author: Roy Andries De Groot
- Language: English
- Publisher: Bobbs-Merrill
- Publication date: 1973
- ISBN: 0-672-51773-6
- OCLC: 762351

The Auberge of the Flowering Hearth is a non-fiction food book by Roy Andries De Groot.

Published in 1973, the book is about the time de Groot spent at an inn called L'Auberge de l'Âtre Fleuri in St-Pierre-de-Chartreuse in the Savoy region of France, and about the meals he ate there.

The book addresses the logic of constructing a meal of several dishes so that they harmonize with one another, to the use of primarily local and seasonal ingredients to contribute to this harmony, and also an internal harmony within individual dishes. It is also a snapshot of old-school aperitifs, such as kir, and illustrates how a modest kitchen can produce out world-class food.

One of the more notable aspects of the book is that de Groot was blind.

The book has been cited as an important influence by many later chefs and food writers, including Julee Rosso and Alice Waters. It was also a favorite of Nach Waxman, the founder of Kitchen Arts & Letters.

== Controversies ==
There is discussion over whether or not the auberge de Groot visited existed as described. Due to de Groot's blindness, most of the descriptions are likely fictionalized. De Groot's then-assistant, art historian Petra ten-Doesschate Chu, had accompanied de Groot along with Bonnie Messenger to the auberge inn in 1968, and noted that they had very few meals and the inn in reality had very little decor, unlike de Groot's descriptions in his book.

De Groot himself insisted that he couldn't reveal the inn's real name and location for fear of tourists. When it was found, readers were disappointed to find that the inn and its cooking were nothing like the book. In response, de Groot made excuses that the new owners must have changed the menu, or French conservation laws meant the cooking couldn't be the same.

Cookbook editor Judith Jones rejected the book due to lack of substantive materials, despite de Groot insisting upon the "total reality" of the book. Philadelphia Inquirer Food Editor Elaine Tait had her own suspicions, referring to the Auberge as a "Utopia where nothing ever burns, is too salty or sweet." Chef Alice Waters, much inspired by the book, had attempted to find the auberge, and found it to be not like description either.

== Sources ==
- de Groot, Roy Andries (1973). Recipes from the Auberge of the Flowering Hearth: A Gastronomic Adventure at the Finest of the French Provincial Inns. Indianapolis/New York: The Bobbs-Merrill Company, Inc. p. 444. ISBN 0-672-51773-6.
