= Veruscript =

Pashto

- Status: Inactive
- Defunct: 2019
- Country of origin: United Kingdom
- Headquarters location: London, W10
- Distribution: Open access
- Publication types: journals
- Official website: web.archive.org/web/*/veruscript.com

Veruscript was a London-based publisher of open access academic journals from November 2015 to May 2019.

The founders were husband and wife Gleb Cheblakov and Nazik Ibraimova via their company AGC Partners, funded by his father Andrey Cheglakov. In June 2016, Veruscript launched four journals and paid their peer reviewers from article processing charges.

In December 2016, Veruscript was the subject of allegations that it was involved in Russian attempts to influence the UK intelligence community via the Cambridge Intelligence Seminar. While denying the allegations, Veruscript decided to close the Journal of Intelligence and Terrorism Studies, which had been set up with Neil Kent, the convenor of the seminars.

Veruscript closed in May 2019 and articles from three journals, Cambridge Journal of Eurasian Studies, Journal of Intelligence and Terrorism Studies, and Veruscript Functional Nanomaterials, were made available via the Portico archiving service.
