= Seyyed Javad Emami =

Iranian cleric (1884-1965)

- جواد امامی
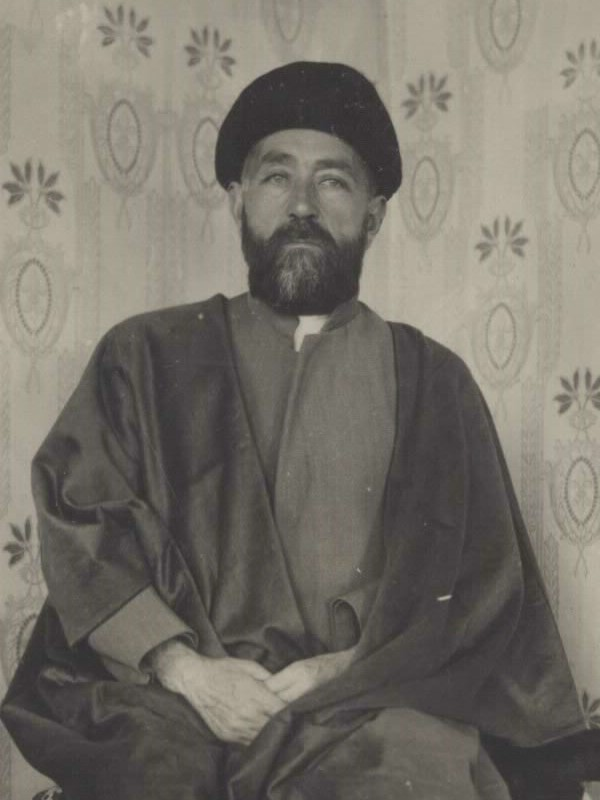
- Photograph of Emami
- Title: Zahir ol-Islam

Personal life
- Born: 1884 Tehran, Qajar Iran
- Died: 21 March 1965 (aged 80–81) Tehran, Pahlavi Iran
- Resting place: Aqa's Tomb
- Spouse: An daughter of Mozaffar ad-Din Shah Qajar
- Parents: Mir Seyyed Zayn ul-Abedin (father); Zia' os-Saltaneh (mother)
- Relatives: Naser al-Din Shah Qajar (maternal grandfather)

Religious life
- Religion: Islam
- Denomination: Twelwer Shi'a
- Lineage: Sayyid, Qajar
- Jurisprudence: Ja'fari

Muslim leader
- Post: Custodian of Madrasa of Sepahsalar Mosque
- Period in office: 1905, 1915, 1923, 1946 and 1955

Seyyed Javad Emami (Persian: سید جواد امامی), also known with title of Zahir ol-Islam (Persian: ظهیرالاسلام, lit. 'Supporter of Islam'; 1884 – 21 March 1965), was an Iranian Shia scholar, Custodian and politician.

== Biography ==
=== Early life and career ===
Seyyed Javad Emami was born in 1884 to Mir Seyyed Zayn ul-Abedin, the Imam of Friday Prayer of Tehran and Zia' os-Saltaneh, the daughter of Naser al-Din Shah. At five years old, he entered to clerical profession and completed his elementary education, studied Islamic sciences, Fiqh (Jurisprudence) and principles of Fiqh. Following his father's death in January/February 1904, Emami was bestowed the title Zahir ol-Islam (Persian: ظهیرالاسلام, lit. 'Supporter of Islam').

In 1906, Emami married an daughter of Mozaffar ad-Din Shah Qajar. On next year, he was appointed custodian of Madrasa in Sepahsalar Mosque. However, his appointment faced opposition from a group of seminary students, who sought a fatwa' from Haj Mirza Abotalib to determine whether Emami belonged to Ulama or aristocracy and nobility.

=== Persian Constitutional Revolution ===
After death of Mozaffar ad-Din Shah Qajar and accession of Mohammad Ali Shah Qajar, Qajar court grew hostile toward the Constitutionalists, he aligned himself with Sheikh Fazlullah Nouri. In 1907, Mohammad Ali dissolved the National Consultative Assembly and declared the Constitution abolished because it was contrary to Islamic law. Emami joined to Constitutional Movement and advocated for a Legitimate Constitutionalism grounded in Sharia.

In 1918, when Ahmad Qavam was appointed governor of Khorasan province, Qavam came into conflict with Seyyed Javad Emami, who was then serving as deputy administrator of Astan Quds Razavi. Emami eventually allied himself with Colonel Mohammad Taqi Pessian against Qavam. However, Colonel Pessian killed on 3 October 1921 in battle at Quchan, against 1000 mounted Kurds sent by Ahmad Qavam.

== Later life and death ==
In 1947, following the resumption of diplomatic relations between Iran and Saudi Arabia, Seyyed Javad Emami was dispatched to Saudi Arabia by Mohammad Reza Pahlavi as Extraordinary Envoy and Amir al-Hajj. In 1950, Emami was appointed by royal decree as Senator for Tehran in 1st Senate of Iran. Seyyed Javad Emami died in Tehran on 21 March 1965. He was buried in family mausoleum of his grandfather, Mirza Abolqasem Imam Jomeh, popularly known as Aqa's Tomb located in southern Tehran.

== Sources ==
- Aqeli, Baqer (2020). شرح حال رجال نظامی و سیاسی معاصر ایران [Biographies of Contemporary Iranian Military and Political Figures] (in Persian). Vol. 1. Tehran: Nashr-e Nimak.
- Spinney, Laura (2017). Pale Rider: The Spanish Flu of 1918 and how it Changed the World. London: Vintage.
- Bamdad, Mehdi (1972). شرح حال رجال ایران در قرن ۱۲ و ۱۳ و ۱۴ هجری [Biographies of Iranian Notables in the 12th, 13th and 14th Centuries AH] (PDF) (in Persian). Vol. 1. Zavvar.
- Tabatabai, Abdolkarim (1962). "سالنامه دنیا" [Yearbook of World]. Salnameh-ye Donya (in Persian). 18. Tehran.
- Karimi, Sakineh. "جواد امامی (ظهیرالاسلام)" [Javad Emami (Zahir ol-Islam)]. Institute for Iranian Contemporary Historical Studies (in Persian). IICHS.
- Donzel, Emeri van (1994). Islamic Desk Reference. BRILL. ISBN 90-04-09738-4.
- Parsa-Binab, Younes (2004). تاریخ صد ساله احزاب و سازمان‌های سیاسی ایران: از انقلاب مشروطیت ۱۲۸۵ تا انقلاب بهمن ۱۳۵۷ [The Hundred-Year History of Political Parties and Organizations in Iran: From the Constitutional Revolution of 1285 to the Bahman Revolution of 1357] (in Persian). Ravandi Publishing. ISBN 9780974814605.
- Farhang Qahremani, Ata-Allah (1977) [2536 Imperial Calendar]. اسامي نمايندگان مجلس شوراى ملى از آغاز مشروطيت تا دورۀ 24 قانونگذارى [Names of the Members of Parliament from the Beginning of the Constitution to the 24th Legislative Term] (in Persian).
