= Adam Bartsch =

Austrian scholar and artist (1757–1821)

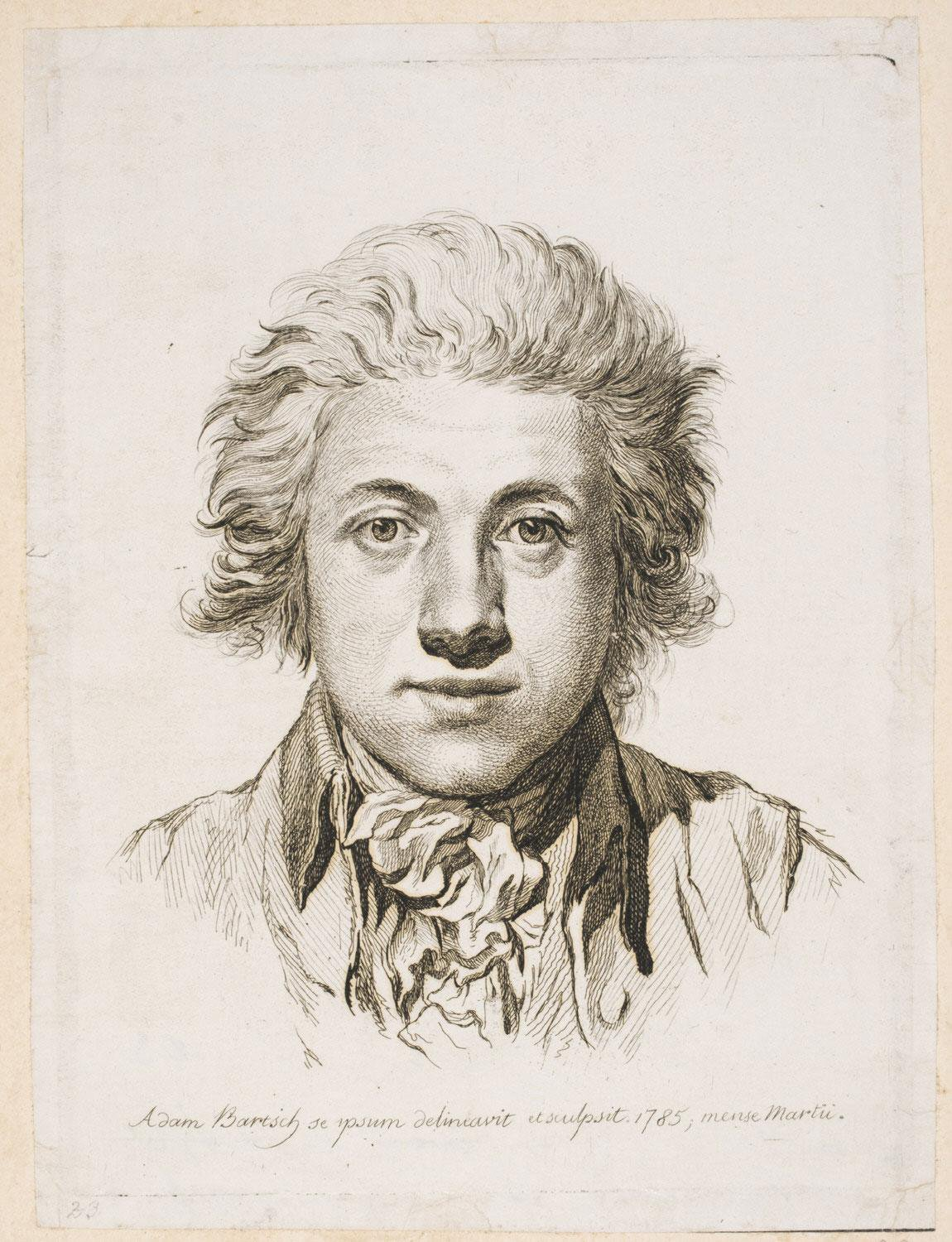
Self-portrait, 1785

Johann Adam Bernhard Ritter von Bartsch (17 August 1757 – 21 August 1821) was an Austrian scholar and artist. His catalogue of old master prints, Le Peintre Graveur is the foundation of print history, and he was himself a printmaker practicing engraving and etching.

Bartsch was born and died in Vienna. He joined the staff of the Royal Court Library in Vienna in 1777, after studying engraving at the Vienna Kupferstecheracademie, and became head curator of the print collection in 1791. He was also an advisor to Duke Albert of Saxe-Teschen, who founded the collection of the Albertina, Vienna, then as now the world's finest collection of old master prints. In the twentieth century the two collections were merged in the Albertina.

== "Le Peintre Graveur" ==
Between 1803 and his death in 1821, Bartsch published in French in 21 volumes Le Peintre Graveur, a pioneering catalogue of old master prints by Dutch, Flemish, German, and Italian painter-engravers from the 15th to the 17th century. References to "Bartsch" normally mean this work. It has been reprinted five times, most recently in 1982. In 1821 he also published the Kupferstichkunde (The Art of Engraving) in German.

== "The Illustrated Bartsch" ==
"The Illustrated Bartsch" (Abaris Books, New York) is an English language illustrated version of "Le Peintre Graveur." (The original "Le Peintre Graveur" was unillustrated by technological necessity.) The "Illustrated Bartsch" General Editor was Walter L. Strauss. The project has been underway since 1978, and is projected to include at least 164 volumes. Most of the picture volumes are published; the accompanying text volumes, in effect complete new catalogues raisonnés, are taking longer. In fact only Bartsch's numbering is retained in full, although his original is often quoted. All the prints known to Bartsch are illustrated in the first 50 volumes. Prints not known to Bartsch, not listed by him or new attributions are listed in the companion and later volumes. It is often abbreviated to "TIB" in references. It (currently the images only) is available online to colleges and other institutions subscribing to ARTstor- essentially in US & Canada only.

== Legacy ==
Bartsch established what has become the definitive numbering system, bearing his name (e.g. "Bartsch 17" or "B17"), for Rembrandt etchings and the prints of many other artists, which is still used or at least referred to most subsequent and standard works in this field. His numbers list the works by category, roughly following the contemporary hierarchy of genres, except that self-portraits come first, followed by biblical subjects, then subjects of saints, allegories, and so on. In his lifetime, Bartsch executed over 500 plates from his own designs and from those of other masters. Many are attractive but he is not a major artist.

His term peintre-graveur or painter-engraver is also still in use to distinguish original from reproductive printmakers, especially in the period of the old master print (to about 1830).
