= Auberge =

Auberge is a French word for an inn or hostel, and is also sometimes used to refer to a restaurant (as a result of the historical association between inns and restaurants).

== Inns ==
- Auberge Ravoux, historic landmark in French village of Auvers-sur-Oise
- Auberge (restaurant), former Michelin-starred restaurant in Amsterdam, Netherlands.
- Auberge du Soleil, restaurant and resort in California, with interiors designed by Michael Taylor.
- Auberges built by the Knights Hospitaller, the headquarters of the Knights Hospitaller's administrative divisions, located in Rhodes and then Malta

== Music ==
- Auberge, folk album by Le Rêve du Diable, 1982
- Auberge (album), a 1991 album by Chris Rea
  - "Auberge" (song), a song by Chris Rea from the album of the same name

== See also ==
- L'Auberge (disambiguation)
