= Peintre-graveur =

Peintre-graveur (French pronunciation: [pɛ̃tʁ(ə) ɡʁavœʁ]) is a term probably invented and certainly popularized by the great scholar of the old master print, Adam Bartsch (Johann Adam Bernhard von Bartsch: 1757 - 1821, both Vienna). The term, meaning "painter-engraver", is intended to distinguish between printmakers, whether working in engraving, etching or woodcut, who designed images with the primary purpose of producing a print, and those who essentially copied in a print medium a composition by another, to produce what is known as a "reproductive print", or who produced only essentially non-artistic work in print form, such as maps for example.

"Painter-engraver" is sometimes used in English. Alternative terms for the work of a Peintre-graveur are "artist's print", "original print", "graphic art". "Art print" now tends to mean a reproduction of any work of art.

Bartsch's great catalogue of old master prints, published in Vienna in 21 volumes in 1803-21, was called "Le Peintre Graveur". It has been reprinted five times, most recently in 1982. The Illustrated Bartsch (Abaris Books, New York) is an English language illustrated version (the original was unillustrated by technological necessity) which released the first volume in 1978, and is projected to include at least 164 volumes. Most of the picture volumes are published; the accompanying text volumes, in effect complete new catalogues raissonés, are taking longer. It (currently Abaris Books has granted a non-exclusive license for many of the images found in The Illustrated Bartsch and they are available online to colleges and other institutions subscribing to ARTstor.

== Sources ==
- Antony Griffiths, Prints and Printmaking, p 128 etc., British Museum Press (in UK), 2nd edn, 1996 ISBN 0-7141-2608-X
- A Hyatt Mayor, Prints and People, Metropolitan Museum of Art/Princeton, 1971, no., ISBN 0-691-00326-2
- Dossi, Barbara; Albertina, The History of the Collection and its Masterpieces, Prestel, 1999, ISBN 3-7913-2340-7

== See also ==
- Old master print
- Adam von Bartsch
- Printmaking
