= Monique Saint-Hélier =

Swiss writer

Monique Saint-Hélier was the pseudonym of Berthe Eimann-Briod (born 2 September 1895 in La Chaux-de-Fonds, Switzerland - 9 March 1955 in Pacy-sur-Eure, France), a Swiss writer. From 1917, she was married to the Swiss translator and teacher Blaise Briod (1896–1981), both converted to Catholicism together.

== Life ==
Saint-Hélier was born in 1895 in La Chaux-de-Fonds, one of the most famous cities for Swiss watch production. She lost her mother at the age of three. She had to undergo her first operation at the age of eleven. In 1917, she married Blaise Briod. Both studied literature in Bern and converted to Catholicism on their wedding day. After her conversion, Saint-Hélier changed her first name to Monique in 1918 (her stage name Saint-Hélier refers to St Helier, whose memorial day fell on her mother's birthday). In 1923 she met Rainer Maria Rilke, with whom she became close friends and who encouraged her to write. She dedicated her first published text ("A Rilke pour Noël", 1927) to him. At the end of 1925, Saint-Hélier and Briod left Switzerland and went to Paris. In France, Saint-Hélier's health deteriorated and she was confined to her bed most of the time. In 1940, she fled from the invasion of the German troops, but soon had to return to Paris, where she remained in her sickbed until the end of the war. She wrote about this time in her diary from 1940 to 1948. She died on 9 March 1955, 14 days after the publication of her last book.

== Work ==
For the Swiss literary scholar Charles Linsmayer, Saint-Hélier is "one of the most important Swiss authors of the 20th century". The French literary critic Isabelle Rüf describes her style as a break with the traditional French novel and points out similarities to Virginia Woolf. The literary scholar Doris Jakubec sees parallels to Marcel Proust's polyphonic narrative style.

Saint-Hélier's main work is an unfinished cycle of novels about the decline of the Alérac, Balagny and Graew families in the Swiss town of La Chaux-de-Fonds.

== Works (in German translation) ==
- Traumkäfig (Original: La Cage aux rêves. Paris, R.-A. Corrêa, 1932). German by Hedi Wyss. Huber, Frauenfeld 1990.
- Morsches Holz (Original: Bois-Mort. Paris, Grasset, 1934). German by Rudolf Jakob Humm. Morgarten Verlag, Zurich 1939 / Suhrkamp, Frankfurt/Main 1987 (1952).
- Strohreiter (Original: Le Cavalier de paille. Paris, Grasset, 1936). German by Cécile Ines Loos, Morgarten Verlag, Zurich 1939 / Suhrkamp 1952.
- Der Eisvogel (Original: Le Martin-pêcheur. Paris, Grasset, 1953). German by Leonharda Gescher, Suhrkamp 1954.
- Quick (Original: Quick. Neuchâtel, La Baconnière, 1954). German by Leonharda Gescher, Suhrkamp 1954.
- Die rote Gießkanne (Original: L'Arrosoir rouge. Paris, Grasset, 1955). German by Leonharda Gescher, Suhrkamp 1956.
