= Aluka =

Online digital library

Aluka (library)
- Aluka logo
- Website type: Digital library
- Owner: Ithaka Harbors
- Creator: Aluka
- Website: http://www.aluka.org
- Commercial: Not-for-profit
- Current status: integrated into JSTOR in 2008

Aluka was an online digital library focused on Africa-related material. It focused on globally connecting scholars by building a common platform for online collaboration and knowledge sharing. Aluka's intended audience was higher education and research communities.

Aluka was an initiative of Ithaka Harbors, a non-profit organization focused on incubating promising new projects that use technology for the benefit of higher education. It aims to grow successful projects into independent services or adjoined to larger, existing organizations for the academic community. In June 2008, the Ithaka and JSTOR Trustees approved a recommendation that the Aluka initiative be integrated into JSTOR.

Founded in 2003, Aluka was an initiative of Ithaka, a non-profit organization based in New York City and Princeton, New Jersey. The initial funding was provided by the Mellon Foundation, the William and Flora Hewlett Foundation, and the Stavros S. Niarchos Foundation.

The first release of Aluka took place in early February 2007 with preview access to JSTOR subscribers. Aluka was made free to all academic and other not-for-profit institutions in Africa.

The name 'Aluka' is derived from a Zulu word meaning 'to weave'.

Aluka sought to attract other collections of scholarly interest from institutions and individuals worldwide. By bringing materials together, it created new opportunities for research and collaboration. Documents and materials that were previously hard or impossible to access were made globally available to researchers.

== Content ==
The Aluka digital library was focused on three major areas:

- African Plants Initiative: Collection of African plants specimens and related material funded by the Mellon Foundation, which was migrated to JSTOR
- Cultural Heritage: 3D models, panorama tours, plans, sections, and elevation data derived from the 3D models and a collection of photographs documenting African heritage sites, which were created and provided by the Zamani Project. This collection includes the Djingereyber mosque in Timbuktu, the great mosque of Djenne, the rock-hewn churches of Lalibela, Petra, the Swahili ruins on Kilwa Kisiwani and Sonog Mnara, the Lamu fort, the Shela mosque, Elmina Castle, Fort of São Sebastião, and many more. This content area also includes a large collection of African Rock Art.
- Struggles for Freedom: Documents, images, and other materials documenting the liberation struggles in Southern Africa, including those from Angola, Botswana, Mozambique, Namibia, South Africa, and Zimbabwe.

== See also ==
- List of academic databases and search engines
- Digital preservation

== External links and Further reading ==
- Project briefing at the meeting of the Coalition for Networked Information
- Meeting of Africana Librarians Council at the Library of Congress
- Introduction to Aluka from the Association of Research Libraries
- Isaacman, A., Lalu, P., Nygren, T. 2005. Digitization, History, and the Making of a Postcolonial Archive of Southern African Liberation Struggles: The Aluka Project. in Africa Today v.52 no.2. doi:10.1353/at.2006.0009 hdl:10566/299
- Can Technology Save the Developing World in the Chronicle of Higher Education July 21, 2006.
- Building a Digital Library of Scholarly Resources from the Developing World: An Introduction to Aluka, Rajan, R., Ruther, H. in African Arts v.40 issue 2. doi:10.1162/afar.2007.40.2.1
- Documenting African Sites: The Aluka Project, Rajan, R., Ruther, H. in Journal of the Society of Architectural Historians v.66 number 4. JSTOR 10.1525/jsah.2007.66.4.437 doi:10.1525/jsah.2007.66.4.437
- Project Digitizes Works from the Golden Age of Timbuktu in The New York Times May 20, 2008.
- "The Rush to Save Timbuktu's Crumbling Manuscripts". Der Spiegel. August 1, 2008.
