= Association of Historians of Nineteenth-Century Art =

International academic organization

The Association of Historians of Nineteenth-Century Art was formed in 1993. International in its scope, the organization provides a means for scholars of nineteenth-century art from around the world to share ideas and resources through a variety of venues including conferences sessions, a newsletter and a scholarly journal, Nineteenth-Century Art Worldwide.

Nineteenth-Century Art Worldwide was the first online, peer-reviewed journal devoted to the study of nineteenth-century art. This journal has been cited by organizations like the Carnegie Corporation as a model for the electronic dissemination of scholarship.

== Officers ==
- President: Nancy Locke
- Vice president: Allison Leigh
- Secretary: Nancy Karrels
- Treasurer: Martha Lucy
- Membership coordinator:
- Program chair: Michelle Foa
- Newsletter editor: Kara Shier

== At-large board members ==
- Daniella Berman
- Elizabeth C. Childs
- Gloria Groom
- Andrew Shelton
- Petra ten-Doesschate Chu and Isabel Taube (co-managing editors of NCAW)
