= The Illustrated Bartsch =

The Illustrated Bartsch (TIB) is an extensive catalogue with commentary of European old master prints, published by the Abaris Books imprint of OPAL Publishing Corporation. It is based on the 21 volume Le Peintre-Graveur, by Adam von Bartsch, published in the early nineteenth century, which listed the prints and gave a concise description without illustrations, noting different states. The Illustrated Bartsch has maintained its position as the premier reference work in the field of European old master prints for over 40 years; it consists of images of European master prints from around 1420 until around 1850, with extensive commentaries. This 400-year span details the origins of printmaking, from entirely manually created and pulled prints, to the introduction of mechanical printing presses and photography.

The cooperation and contribution of many of the worlds finest art historians have helped the work maintain its relevance as an art reference manual by reflecting the ongoing progress of scholarship. The continual evolution of art history and scholarship provide new additions and attributions (as well as de-attributions), which have caused the project to grow exponentially. Bartsch's original 24 volume list has grown to over 100 volumes under the Abaris Books imprint, which was, in 2010, compiling further volumes.

== History ==
Walter L. Strauss's General Plan for The Illustrated Bartsch was drawn up in the early 1970s, and the first edition of the collection (Netherlandish Artists) was published in 1978 under Strauss' own publishing company, Abaris Books. While an earlier attempt at producing an illustrated edition of Le Peintre-Graveur was abandoned after a single volume, TIB is now (as of 2010) in 104 volumes and growing. it is certainly the most intensive and complete effort made toward the project. After Strauss' death in 1988, Abaris Books was made an imprint of OPAL Publishing Corporation, which continues to produce volumes under his General Plan. Commentary volumes complete the catalogues raisonnés of artists named in Le Peintre-Graveur. Supplementary volumes present the collections of artists not indexed in the original list.

== Picture atlases ==
The first 48 volumes of The Illustrated Bartsch present every old master print in Adam von Bartsch's Le Peintre-Graveur, and are referred to as “picture atlases.” Abaris Books coined this term in the General Plan to refer to the volumes which illustrate the original list of painter-engravers. While "picture atlases" are notable in their faithful presentation of Bartsch's list, time and scholasticism have ascertained accuracies and inaccuracies in the attributions made by Bartsch.

== Commentary volumes ==
Commentary volumes are important with special consideration to the continuously expanding field of art history, as they list master prints unknown to or excluded by Bartsch:

“All the prints known to Bartsch are illustrated in the first fifty volumes...Prints not known to Bartsch, or not listed by him, will be illustrated in companion volumes. These will include commentaries on the prints...as well as new attributions wherever required. Bartsch's sequence of artists and subjects has been retained.”

Commentary volumes expand and augment individual “Picture Atlases” with new progress of art scholarship. Emphasizing new attributions, de-attributions, additional states, and copies (among others) maintains the usefulness and pertinence of the historical art collection as scholastic reference works.

== Supplementary volumes ==
Supplementary volumes are a unique creation of Abaris Books. By including Supplement volumes, Abaris Books took note of artists omitted by Bartsch, and these volumes detail print artists unknown to, overlooked by, or rejected by Bartsch. Supplement volumes also include artists who flourished after Bartsch's death, specifically Volumes 101 through 140 on German, French, Italian and British artists of the Nineteenth Century, and Volume 141, dedicated solely to Belgian artist James Ensor. Supplement Volumes 161 through 166 follow a scheme of much earlier artists. These volumes consist of German Single Leaf Woodcuts before 1500 by Anonymous Artists, as organized by Wilhelm Ludwig Schreiber and originally published in the early 20th century.

== Notes ==
a: An illustrated version of Bartsch's list was first undertaken by the Pennsylvania State University Press, which published an illustrated edition of Bartsch's 12th volume in 1971. However, the project was abandoned after the publication of a single volume
