= Larry Qualls =

American visual arts archival documentarian

Larry Qualls (died December 3, 2022) was an American visual arts archival documentarian, editor, and art critic whose library of images the "Larry Qualls Archive" (100,000 images documenting 30 years of New York City gallery exhibitions) was acquired by ARTSTOR. Qualls was a past associate editor of Performing Arts journal, an academic publication for which he also authored many articles over the course of several decades. He was also a frequent presence on the New York City art scene and his appearances were often noted by among other sources the New York Social Diary. Qualls was also a contributor to the late art magazine Art on Paper.
