= War in the Highlands =

1998 film by Francis Reusser

- Theatrical release poster
- French: La Guerre dans le Haut Pays
- Directed by: Francis Reusser
- Written by: Francis Reusser; Jean-Claude Carrière; Emmanuelle de Riedmatten
- Based on: La Guerre dans le Haut Pays by Charles-Ferdinand Ramuz
- Produced by: Gérard Ruey; Jean-Louis Porchet
- Starring: Marion Cotillard; Yann Trégouët; François Marthouret; Antoine Basler; François Morel; Laurent Terzieff
- Cinematography: Christophe Beaucarne
- Edited by: Jacques Witta
- Music by: Jean-François Monot
- Production companies: Arena Films; CAB Productions; Saga Film; Radio Télévision Suisse
- Distributed by: Frenetic Films (Switzerland); Rezo Films (France); Cooperative Nouveau Cinéma (Belgium)
- Release dates: 7 October 1998 (Switzerland); 5 May 1999 (France)
- Running time: 105 minutes
- Countries: Switzerland; France; Belgium
- Language: French
- Budget: 4,8 million francs

War in the Highlands (French: La Guerre dans le Haut Pays) is a 1998 war drama film written and directed by Francis Reusser and starring Marion Cotillard. The film is a co-production between Switzerland, France and Belgium and it is based on the 1915 novel La Guerre dans le Haut-Pays by Charles-Ferdinand Ramuz, concerning Switzerland in the Napoleonic era. The film was released theatrically in Switzerland on 7 October 1998, and in France on 5 May 1999.

The film competed for the Golden Bear at the 1999 Berlin Film Festival. It was selected as the Swiss entry for the Best Foreign Language Film category at the 71st Academy Awards in 1999, but it was not nominated. Cotillard won the Best Actress award at the 1999 Autrans Mountain Film Festival for her performance.

== Cast ==
- Marion Cotillard as Julie Bonzon
- Yann Trégouët as David Aviolat
- François Marthouret as Josias Aviolat
- Antoine Basler as Ansermoz
- Patrick Le Mauff as Tille
- Jacques Michel as Jean Bonzon
- Jean-Pierre Gos as Pastor
- François Morel as Devenoge

== Production ==
The film is a co-production between Switzerland, France and Belgium. It was based on the 1915 novel La Guerre dans le Haut-Pays by Charles-Ferdinand Ramuz, concerning Switzerland in the Napoleonic era. It had a budget of 4,8 million francs.

== Release ==
The film was released theatrically in Switzerland on 7 October 1998, and in France on 5 May 1999.

== Awards and nominations ==
War in the Highlands competed for the Golden Bear at the 1999 Berlin Film Festival. It was selected as the Swiss entry for the Best Foreign Language Film category at the 71st Academy Awards, but it was not nominated.

Year	Award / Festival	Category	Recipient(s)	Result	Ref.
1999	Autrans Mountain Film Festival	Special Mention - Best Actress	Marion Cotillard	Won	
1999	Berlin Film Festival	Golden Bear	Francis Reusser	Nominated	
1999	Swiss Film Award	Best Feature Film	Francis Reusser	Nominated	

== See also ==
- List of submissions to the 71st Academy Awards for Best Foreign Language Film
- List of Swiss submissions for the Academy Award for Best Foreign Language Film
