= Abaris Books =

- Parent company: Opal Publishing Corporation
- Status: Active
- Founded: 1970. New York, New York
- Founder: Walter L. Strauss
- Successor: A.S. Kaufmann
- Country of origin: United States
- Headquarters location: Norwalk, CT 06850
- Distribution: Worldwide
- Key people: JC West, Managing editor
- Publication types: Scholarly Reference Works
- Nonfiction topics: Art History & Art Reference
- Fiction genres: Nonfiction
- No. of employees: Four
- Official website: Abaris Books Website

Abaris Books is a scholarly publishing house based in Norwalk, Connecticut, which produces authoritative art reference books. Abaris is renowned for its definitive collections of titles in art history and other subjects, and for its cataloguing of renowned artists such as Albrecht Dürer, Rembrandt van Rijn, Marcantonio Raimondi, Jean Duvet, Wenceslaus Hollar, Antonio Tempesta, The Carraccis, and Caravaggio. The pictorial encyclopaedia of old master prints, The Illustrated Bartsch, is pre-eminent in their collection. Founded by Walter L. Strauss, Abaris is named for Abaris the Hyperborean.

== History ==
=== Founding and early publishing ===
Abaris Books was founded in 1970 in New York by Walter L. Strauss. Abaris publishes a multitude of titles which contribute to the vast fields of art history and art reference. Strauss edited numerous titles, most notably launching the illustrated edition of Count Adam von Bartsch's famous 24 volume list. This massive project was left unfinished upon Strauss' death, and Abaris Books became an imprint of OPAL Publishing Corporation. OPAL has furthered the progress of Abaris and The Illustrated Bartsch.

OPAL chose to focus on The Illustrated Bartsch as the premier title of Abaris Books, however Abaris receives worldwide recognition for their publications of the catalogues raisonnés of Albrecht Dürer and Rembrandt. Abaris currently publishes 13 volumes concentrating on catalogues raisonnés of Albrecht Dürer, including two volumes of The Illustrated Bartsh, one a picture atlas, and the other a commentary.

Abaris also publishes considerable titles such as The Complete Drawings of Albrecht Dürer, Drawings of the Rembrandt School, and The Royal Horse and Rider: Painting, Sculpture, and Horsemanship 1500-1800, winner of the 1989 C.I.N.O.A. Prize.

=== Rebuilding after 2005 ===
A warehouse fire in 2005 destroyed the entire Abaris Books inventory, over 35,000 volumes. This included the entire collection of The Illustrated Bartsch. Since then, the small staff of Abaris Books has reprinted the entire collection of 104 volumes, and currently works toward producing future volumes, as organized under the General Plan. Other titles are planned for restocking and all titles remain in print.

== Titles ==
Notable titles include Colin Eisler's The Master of the Unicorn: The Life and Work of Jean Duvet, Udo Kultermann's The History of Art History, the definitive English translation by Winslow Ames of Joseph Meder's classic, The Mastery of Drawing, François Bucher's Architector: The Lodge Books and Sketchbooks of Medieval Architects, Vladimír Denkstein's Hollar Drawings, and Walter Strauss' own Chiaroscuro: The Clair-Obscure Woodcuts by the German and Netherlandish Masters of the XVIth and XVIIth Centuries.

=== The Illustrated Bartsch ===
Often shortened to “TIB” as a reference, or simply called the Bartsch, The Illustrated Bartsch is Abaris Books' most notable and renowned title. First aimed to illustrate Adam von Bartsch's list of European master printmakers, present scholarship has proven omissions and incorrect attributions in Bartsch's list. The first 48 volumes of The Illustrated Bartsch cohere directly to the artists found on Bartsch's list; however there are presently over 100 volumes in print, many of them Commentary and Supplementary editions. These additional volumes define the scholarship of European master prints and reflect the world of art scholasticism.

=== ARTstor collection ===
In 2003, Abaris Books granted a non-exclusive license to the Andrew W. Mellon Foundation of New York to convert portions of their photographic archive into electronic format. The licensed illustrations can be viewed on the website of the not-for-profit educational organization, ARTstor.

=== Co-publication ===
Abaris has co-published titles with several major institutions, including:

- Hood Museum of Art (Dartmouth College)
- The Metropolitan Museum of Art (New York City)
- Toth Publishers (Amsterdam)
- Art Services International (Virginia)

== See also ==
- List of companies based in Norwalk, Connecticut

== Footnotes ==
- a: January 14, 1988
