= André Maurois =

French author (1885–1967)

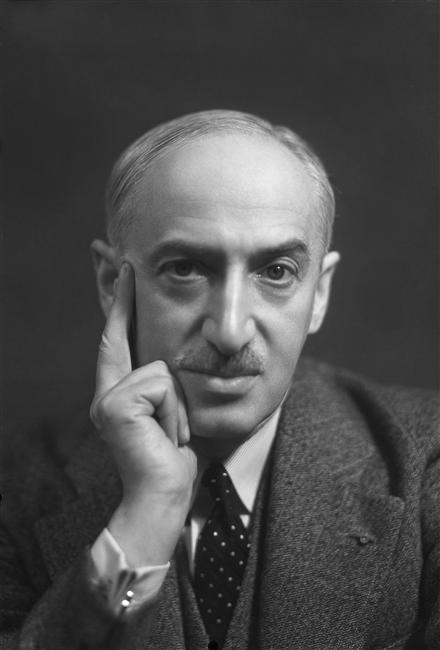
- Maurois in 1936
- Born: Émile Salomon Wilhelm Herzog; 26 July 1885; Elbeuf, France
- Died: 9 October 1967 (aged 82); Neuilly-sur-Seine, France
- Education: Lycée Pierre-Corneille
- Occupation: Author
- Spouses: Jeanne-Marie Wanda de Szymkiewicz (m. 1912; died 1924) Simone de Caillavet (m. 1926)
- Children: 4
- Relatives: France Bloch-Sérazin (maternal niece); Jean-Richard Bloch (brother-in-law); Gaston Arman de Caillavet (father-in-law)
- Writing career
- Notable work: Les silences du colonel Bramble

André Maurois (French: [mɔʁwa]; born Émile Salomon Wilhelm Herzog; 26 July 1885 – 9 October 1967) was a French author.

== Biography ==
Maurois was born on 26 July 1885 in Elbeuf and educated at the Lycée Pierre Corneille in Rouen, both in Normandy. A member of the Javal family, Maurois was the son of Ernest Herzog, a Jewish textile manufacturer, and his wife Alice Lévy-Rueff. His family had fled Alsace after the Franco-Prussian War of 1870–71 and took refuge in Elbeuf, where they owned a woollen mill. As noted by Maurois, the family brought their entire Alsatian workforce with them to the relocated mill, for which Maurois' grandfather was admitted to the Legion of Honour for having "saved a French industry". This family background is reflected in Maurois' Bernard Quesnay: the story of a young World War I veteran with artistic and intellectual inclinations who is drawn, much against his will, to work as a director in his grandfather's textile mills – a character clearly having many autobiographical elements.

During World War I, Maurois joined the French army, serving as an interpreter for Lieutenant Colonel Winston Churchill, and later as a liaison officer with the British army. His first novel, Les silences du colonel Bramble, published in 1918, was a witty and socially realistic account of that experience, and was an immediate success in France. The book was soon translated, and became popular in the United Kingdom and other English-speaking countries as The Silence of Colonel Bramble. Many of his other works have also been translated into English, (Note: His principal translator into English was Hamish Miles (1894–1937).) for they often dealt with British people or topics (such as his biographies of Disraeli, Byron, and Shelley).

In 1938 Maurois was elected to the prestigious Académie française. He was encouraged and assisted in seeking this membership by Marshal Philippe Pétain, and he made a point of acknowledging with thanks his debt to Pétain in his 1941 autobiography, Call no man happy – though by the time of writing their paths had sharply diverged, Pétain having become Head of State of Vichy France.

When World War II began, he was appointed the French Official Observer attached to the British General Headquarters. In this capacity he accompanied the British Army to Belgium. He knew personally the main politicians in the French government, and on 10 June 1940 he was sent on a mission to London. After the Armistice ended that mission, Maurois was demobilised and travelled from England to Canada. He wrote of these experiences in his book Tragedy in France.

Later in World War II he served in the French army and the Free French Forces.

His Maurois pseudonym became his legal name in 1947.

He died in 1967 in Neuilly-sur-Seine after a long career as an author of novels, biographies, histories, children's books and science fiction stories. He is buried in Neuilly-sur-Seine Old Communal Cemetery near Paris.

== Family ==
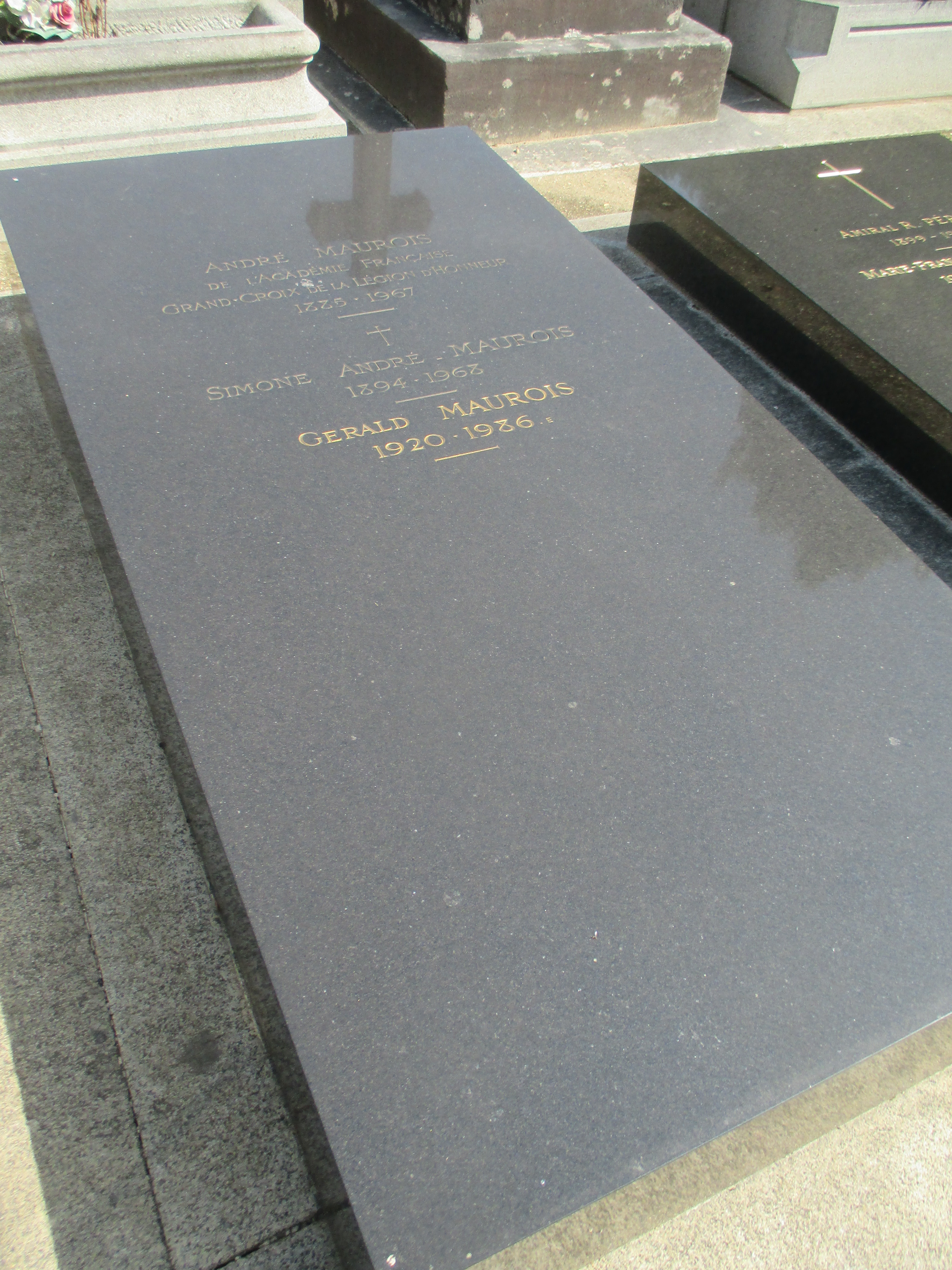
Family grave

In 1912, Maurois married Jeanne-Marie Wanda de Szymkiewicz, a young Polish-Russian aristocrat who had studied at Oxford University. Together they had three children. She had a nervous breakdown in 1918 and in 1924 she died of sepsis. After his father had died, Maurois stopped working in textiles (in the 1926 novel Bernard Quesnay he in effect described an alternative life of himself, in which he would have plunged into the life of a textile industrialist and given up everything else).

In 1926, Maurois married Simone de Caillavet, daughter of playwright Gaston Arman de Caillavet and actress Jeanne Pouquet, and granddaughter of Anatole France's mistress Léontine Arman de Caillavet. The couple had one child. After the fall of France in 1940, the couple moved to the United States to help with propaganda work against the Nazis.

Jean-Richard Bloch was his brother-in-law.

== Honours and awards ==
- Grand-Croix of the Order of Legion of Honour
- Commandeur of the Ordre des Arts et des Lettres

== Bibliography ==
=== Books ===
- Les silences du colonel Bramble, Paris: Grasset, 1918 (includes "Si—", a French translation of Kipling's poem "If—")
- The Silence of Colonel Bramble, London: John Lane / The Bodley Head, 1919 (English translation of Les silences du Colonel Bramble; text translated from the French by Thurfrida Wake; verse translated by Wilfrid Jackson)
- Ni ange, ni bête, Paris: Grasset, 1919; English translation: Neither Angel, Nor Beast, Lincoln, NE: Infusionmedia, 2015 (translated by Preston and Sylvie Shires)
- Les Discours du docteur O'Grady, Paris: Grasset, 1922 ("Le Roman" series); English translation: The Silence of Colonel Bramble; and, The Discourses of Doctor O'Grady, London: Bodley Head, 1965
- Climats, Paris: Grasset, 1923; Paris, Société d'édition "Le livre", 1929 (illustrated by Jean Hugo); English translation: Whatever Gods May Be, London: Cassell, 1929 (translated by Joseph Collins)
- Ariel, ou La vie de Shelley, Paris: Grasset, 1923; English translation: Ariel: The Life of Shelley, New York: D. Appleton and Company, 1924 (translated by Ella D'Arcy)
- Dialogue sur le commandement, Paris: Grasset, 1924; English translation: Captains and Kings, London, John Lane / The Bodley Head, 1925
- Lord Byron et le démon de la tendresse, Paris: A l'enseigne de la Porte Etroite, 1925
- Mape, London: John Lane / The Bodley Head, 1926 (translated by Eric Sutton, with 4 woodcuts by Constance Grant); Mape: The World of Illusion: Goethe, Balzac, Mrs. Siddons, New York: D. Appleton, 1926
- Bernard Quesnay, Paris: Gallimard, 1927
- La vie de Disraëli, Paris: Gallimard, 1927 ("Vies des hommes illustres" series); English translation: Disraeli: A Picture of the Victorian Age, London: John Lane / The Bodley Head, 1927 (translated by Hamish Miles)
- Études anglaises: Dickens, Walpole, Ruskin et Wilde, La jeune littérature, Paris: Grasset, 1927
- Un essai sur Dickens, Paris: Grasset, 1927 (Les Cahiers Verts n° 3)
- Le chapitre suivant, Paris: Éditions du Sagittaire, 1927 (Les Cahiers Nouveaux, N° 34); English translation: The Next Chapter: The War Against the Moon, London: Kegan Paul, Trench, Trübner & Co., 1928
- Aspects de la biographie, Paris: Grasset, 1928; Paris: Au Sens Pareil, 1928; English translation: Aspects of Biography, Cambridge University Press, 1929 (translated by S. C. Roberts)
- Deux fragments d'une histoire universelle: 1992, Paris: Éditions des Portiques, 1928 ("Le coffret des histoires extraordinaires" series)
- La vie de Sir Alexander Fleming, Paris: Hachette, 1929: English translation: The Life of Sir Alexander Fleming: Discoverer of Penicillin, New York: E. P. Dutton, 1958 (translated by Gerard Hopkins and with an introduction by Professor Robert Cruickshank)
- Byron, Paris: Grasset, 1930; English translation: Byron, London: Jonathan Cape, 1930 (translated by Hamish Miles)
- Patapoufs et Filifers, Paris: Paul Hartmann, 1930. With 75 drawings by Jean Bruller (Vercors); English translation: Fattypuffs and Thinifers, New York: Henry Holt and Company, 1940 (translated by Rosemary Benet)
- Lyautey, Paris: Plon, 1931 ("Choses vues" series); English translation: Marshall Lyautey, London: John Lane / The Bodley Head, 1931 (translated by Hamish Miles)
- Le Peseur d'âmes, Paris: Gallimard, 1931; English translation: The Weigher of Souls, London, Cassell, 1931 (translated by Hamish Miles)
- Chateaubriand, Paris: Grasset, 1932; also published under the title of: René ou la Vie de Chateaubriand; English translation (translated by Vera Fraser): Chateaubriand, London: Jonathan Cape, 1938; Chateaubriand: Poet, Statesman, Lover, New York: Harper & Brothers, 1938
- Cercle de famille, 1932; English translation: The Family Circle, London: Peter Davies, 1932 (translated by Hamish Miles)
- Voltaire, London: Peter Davies, 1932 (translated by Hamish Miles)
- Chantiers américains, Paris: Gallimard, NRF collection, 1933 (a collection of articles on America's 'New Deal' projects started under president Franklin Delano Roosevelt)
- Édouard VII et son temps, Paris: Les Éditions de France, 1933; English translation: The Edwardian Era, New York: D. Appleton-Century, 1933
- Kipling and His Works from a French Point of View (The Kipling Society, 1934; republished in Rudyard Kipling: The Critical Heritage, ed. R.L. Green, 1971 & 1997)
- Ricochets: Miniature Tales of Human Life, London: Cassell, 1934 (translated from the French by Hamish Miles); New York: Harper and Brothers, 1937
- Prophets and Poets, New York: Harper & Brothers, 1935 (translated by Hamish Miles). Chapters on Kipling, Shaw, Wells, Chesterton, D. H. Lawrence, Aldous Huxley, Conrad, Lytton Strachey, and Katherine Mansfield.
- Voltaire, Paris: Gallimard, 1935
- Histoire d'Angleterre, Paris: A. Fayard et Cie, 1937 ("Les grandes études historiques" series); English translation: A History of England, London: Jonathan Cape, 1937
- La machine à lire les pensées: Récit, Paris: Gallimard, 1937; English translation: The Thought Reading Machine, London: Jonathan Cape, 1938; New York: Harper & Brothers, 1938 (translated by James Whitall)
- The Miracle of England: An Account of Her Rise to Pre-Eminence and Present Position, New York: Harper & Brothers, 1937
- Un art de vivre, Paris: Plon, 1939 ("Présences" series); English translation: The Art of Living, London: English Universities Press, 1940 (translated by James Whitall)
- Les origines de la guerre de 1939, Paris: Gallimard, 1939
- Tragedy in France: An Eyewitness Account, New York: Harper & Brothers, 1940 (translated by Denver Lindley)
- Why France Fell, London: John Lane / The Bodley Head, 1941 (translated by Denver Lindley)
- I Remember, I Remember, New York: Harper & Brothers, 1942
- Call No Man Happy: Autobiography, London, Jonathan Cape in association with The Book Society, 1943 (translated by Denver and Jane Lindley); The Reprint Society, 1944
- The Miracle of America, New York: Harper & Brothers, 1944
  - Published in the United Kingdom as A new history of the United States (London : John Lane, The Bodley Head, 1948)
- Woman Without Love. New York: Harper & Brothers, 1944
- From My Journal: The Record of a Year of Adjustment for an Individual and for the World, New York: Harper & Brothers, 1947 (translated by Joan Charles)
- Histoire de la France, Paris: Dominique Wapler, 1947
- Alain, Paris: Domat, 1949 ("Au voilier" series)
- À la recherche de Marcel Proust, Paris: Hachette, 1949; English translation: Proust: Portrait of a Genius, New York, Harper, 1950 (translated by Gerard Hopkins); Proust: a Biography, Meridian Books, 1958
- My American Journal, London: The Falcon Press, 1950
- Lélia, ou la vie de George Sand, Paris: Hachette, 1952; English translation: Lelia: The Life of George Sand, London: Jonathan Cape, 1952 (translated by Gerard Hopkins)
- Destins exemplaires (Paris: Plon, 1952); English translation: Profiles of Great Men, Ipswich, UK: Tower Bridge Publications, 1954 (translated by Helen Temple Patterson)
- Lettres à l'inconnue, Paris: La Jeune Parque, 1953; English translation: To an Unknown Lady, New York: E. P. Dutton & Co., 1957
- Cecil Rhodes, London: Collins, 1953 ("Brief Lives", no. 8)
- Olympio ou la vie de Victor Hugo, Paris: Hachette, 1954; English translation: Olympio: The Turbulent Life of Victor Hugo, New York: Harper & Brothers, 1956 (translated by Gerard Hopkins)
- Lecture, mon doux plaisir, Paris: Arthème Fayard, 1957 ("Les Quarante" series); English translation: The Art of Writing, London: The Bodley Head, 1960 (translated by Gerard Hopkins)
- Les Titans ou Les Trois Dumas, Paris: Hachette, 1957: English translation: Titans: A Three-Generation Biography of the Dumas, New York: Harper, 1957 (translated by Gerard Hopkins)
- The World of Marcel Proust, New York: Harper & Row, 1960 (translated by Moura Budberg)
- Adrienne, ou, La vie de Mme de La Fayette, Paris: Hachette, 1960
- Prométhée ou la Vie de Balzac, Paris: Hachette, 1965; English translation: Prometheus: The Life of Balzac, London: The Bodley Head, 1965 (translated by Norman Denny); New York: Harper & Row, 1965
- Points of View from Kipling to Graham Greene, New York: Frederick Ungar, 1968; London: Frederick Muller, 1969
- Memoirs 1885–1967, New York: Harper & Row, 1970 (A Cass Canfield Book; translated by Denver Lindley); London: The Bodley Head, 1970

=== Short stories ===
Short stories by Maurois as collected in The Collected Stories of André Maurois, New York: Washington Square Press, 1967 (translated by Adrienne Foulke):

- An Imaginary Interview
- Reality Transposed
- Darling, Good Evening!
- Lord of the Shadows
- Ariane, My Sister...
- Home Port
- Myrrhine
- Biography
- Thanatos Palace Hotel (adapted as an episode of The Alfred Hitchcock Hour)
- Friends
- Dinner Under the Chestnut Trees
- Bodies and Souls
- The Curse of Gold
- For Piano Alone
- The Departure
- The Fault of M. Balzac
- Love in Exile
- Wednesday's Violets
- A Career
- Ten Year Later
- Tidal Wave
- Transference
- Flowers in Season
- The Will
- The Campaign
- The Life of Man
- The Corinthian Porch
- The Cathedral
- The Ants
- The Postcard
- Poor Maman
- The Green Belt
- The Neuilly Fair
- The Birth of a Master
- Black Masks
- Irène
- The Letters
- The Cuckoo
- The House (adapted as an episode of Night Gallery)

== See also ==
- Merveilleux scientifique
