= Auberge (restaurant) =

Michelin-starred restaurant in Amsterdam, Netherlands

- Interactive map of Auberge

Restaurant information
- Established: 1976
- Closed: 1981
- Head chef: John Halvemaan
- Rating: Michelin Guide
- Location: Leidseplein 8, Amsterdam, 1017 PT, Netherlands
- Coordinates: 52°21′51″N 4°53′01″E

Auberge was a restaurant in Amsterdam, Netherlands. It was a fine dining restaurant that was awarded one Michelin star in 1980 and 1981.

Head chef of Auberge was John Halvemaan.

John Halvemaan and his wife Esther (as restaurant manager) opened the restaurant in 1976. It was closed down in 1981, due to problems with the rent.

== See also ==
- List of Michelin starred restaurants in the Netherlands
