= Alexandra W. Logue =

Alexandra W. Logue is an academic and behavioral scientist. She is currently a research professor in CASE (Center for Advanced Study in Education) of the Graduate Center of the City University of New York She is also a member of the Graduate Center's Behavior Analysis Training Area in the Psychology Ph.D. Program. From 2008 to 2014, she was the Executive Vice Chancellor and University Provost of City University of New York, the CUNY system's Chief Academic Officer. She also served as provost and a professor at New York Institute of Technology.

== Education ==
Alexandra W. Logue attended Harvard University, receiving her A.B. in Psychology Magna Cum Laude in 1974, and her Ph.D. in Experimental Psychology in 1978. As a senior in college and in graduate school she interacted extensively with B. F. Skinner, as well as with other members of the Harvard University behavior analysis faculty. Her dissertation was entitled "Taste Aversion and the Generality of the Laws of Learning", a version of which was subsequently published in Psychological Bulletin.

== Early academic life ==
In 1978, Logue became a faculty member in the Psychology Department of Stony Brook University, rising from the rank of Assistant Professor to Professor. During this period she taught experimental psychology and statistics, and conducted extensive research and published on mathematical models of choice behavior (self-control and impulsiveness), food preferences and aversions, and the history of behaviorism. In 1986 she published the first edition of her book The Psychology of Eating and Drinking. The publication of this book and its subsequent editions, as well as her being a supertaster, have been widely covered in The New York Times and other media. While a faculty member, she published another book, entitled Self-Control: Waiting Until Tomorrow for What You Want Today, in 1995, as well as over a hundred articles and chapters. She was named a Fellow of the American Psychological Association, the Association for Psychological Science, the Psychonomic Society and the American Association for the Advancement of Science. Her research was funded by the National Science Foundation, the National Institute of Mental Health, the McDonnell Foundation and she was given the American Psychological Association's Hake Award for excellence in bridging basic and applied research

== Higher education scholarship ==
Logue has brought her expertise in experimental psychology to bear on issues concerning higher education. This work, funded by the Spencer Foundation, the Institute for Education Sciences, and the Teagle Foundation has ranged from examination of self-control and impulsiveness in higher education administrators to developing mechanisms for assessing administrative performance, to conducting large randomized controlled trials (RCTs) of academic programs designed to increase college student success. She has advocated for the application of social science techniques to higher education administration and has published a series of articles on such matters for Inside Higher Ed. Her most recent book, Pathways to Reform: Credits and Conflict at The City University of New York, is a case study regarding the difficulty of making change in higher education.
