= Ithaka Harbors =

US not-for-profit organization focused on digital technology in higher education

Ithaka Harbors, Inc.
- Formation: 1995; 31 years ago
- Founder: Andrew W. Mellon Foundation
- Type: 501(c)(3) Not-for-profit
- Purpose: Academic Library
- Headquarters: 165 Broadway, 5th Fl, New York, NY 10005
- Coordinates: 40°45′48″N 73°57′59″W
- Products: JSTOR, Artstor, JSTOR Access in Prison
- Key people: Kevin M. Guthrie; Henry Bienen
- Revenue: $85,732,800 (2014)
- Website: ithaka.org

Ithaka Harbors, Inc. (stylized as ITHAKA) is an American not-for-profit, the parent company of digital library website JSTOR, the digital preservation service Portico, and the research and consulting group Ithaka S+R. Its stated mission is to "help the academic community use digital technologies to preserve the scholarly record and to advance research and teaching in sustainable ways". Ithaka was founded in 2003 by Kevin M. Guthrie. Ithaka's total revenue was $105 million in 2019, most of it ($79 million) from JSTOR service fees.

== History ==
JSTOR was founded in 1995 under the direction of current Ithaka president Kevin M. Guthrie. Guthrie also served as the founding president of Ithaka in 2004. Both organizations were initially funded by grants from the Andrew W. Mellon Foundation, which at the time was led by William G. Bowen.

The two organizations announced that they would merge in 2009 after years of working together closely. The organizations stated that the merger was "a natural progression" and that they would work together to help "academic institutions use digital technology to enhance scholarship and teaching and reduce system-wide costs through collective action."

== Services ==
=== JSTOR ===
JSTOR is a major database of academic research materials, with content that includes books, journals, and primary sources.

=== Portico ===
Portico was created by JSTOR in 2002 as the Electronic-Archiving Initiative. It was transferred to Ithaka in 2004. Portico operates as a "'dim' archive for e-journal content" that stores information from scholarly journals and acts as a last-resort backup when a publisher discontinues a publication or goes out of business. For example, the part of Portico housing the journal Graft: Organ and Cell Transplantation was "lit up" and became publicly accessible after access to that journal's website was removed by its publisher. In 2019, Portico generated $6.3 million in revenue.

=== Ithaka S+R ===
Ithaka S+R is a research and consulting service that releases public research reports and offers consulting services to libraries, publishers, scholarly societies, universities, and other non-profit organizations. Ithaka S+R conducts triennial surveys of faculty members and library directors in the United States. In 2019, Ithaka S+R generated $1.8 million in revenue.

== Awards ==
The same year that Ithaka Harbors obtained Portico, the Library of Congress gave a $3 million NDIIPP grant to the company for it to "develop, test, and operate one or more electronic archives for electronic journals", along with providing "long-term access to those journals". The endeavor was known as the Portico Project.

The National Endowment for the Humanities and the Institute of Museum and Library Services named Ithaka Harbors as one of the four recipients of their 2008 Digital Partnership grant awards. The company was chosen because of its Protecting Future Access Now: Developing a Prototype Preservation Model for Digital Books project, which is meant to be a "prototype preservation service that will provide a practical model for the preservation of digitized books."

Ithaka Harbors received federal contract awards in 2010 and 2011. The former was $75,000 given by the US Department of Labor for their "Archived E-journal Collections". A year later, the Department of the Army awarded $17,000 for collection additions of "books, maps and other publications".

== Notable trustees ==
- Henry S. Bienen, former president of Northwestern University
- William G. Bowen, President Emeritus of The Andrew W. Mellon Foundation, former president of Princeton
- Ira Fuchs, former vice president of the Andrew W. Mellon Foundation
- Catharine Bond Hill, President of Vassar College
- Alexandra W. Logue, Executive Vice Chancellor and Provost of the City University of New York (CUNY)
- Judith Shapiro, former President of Barnard College
- Stephen M. Stigler, Professor at the Department of Statistics of the University of Chicago.
- Charles M. Vest, former President of the MIT
