= Roy Andries de Groot =

British-born American culinary writer and wine critic

Baron Roy Andries de Groot (February 21, 1910 – September 16, 1983), was a British-born American culinary writer and wine critic.

He was born in London, the son of a Dutch artist and a French noblewoman. He was educated at St Paul's School and at Oxford University.

During the 1930s, de Groot worked as a news and feature writer, film writer, and director. When World War II broke out, he joined the British Ministry of Information and worked for the BBC, where, during The Blitz of London, he suffered eye injuries that would leave him totally blind within 20 years.

In 1941, De Groot emigrated to the United States and worked for the U.S. State Department. According to his obituary in the New York Times, de Groot gave up his Dutch title in 1945, when he became an American citizen.

In 1948, he married the British actress Katherine Hynes and they lived in a house on Bleecker Street in New York's Greenwich Village with his seeing-eye dog companion, Atena. Of their three daughters, the youngest was placed for adoption, while the two elder daughters, Fiona and Christina, lived with their parents.

In the 1960s, as his vision failed, he switched careers and took up food writing, something he could do with his remaining senses. He wrote for Esquire, Ladies Home Journal, Playboy, House Beautiful, Vintage, McCall's, Gourmet, Time and The New York Times.

De Groot's "Recipes from The Auberge of the Flowering Hearth" (Auberge de l'Atre Fleuri) published in 1973 is a classic in its field. It is the story of how de Groot went to France to seek out the history of the liqueur Chartreuse. In doing so, he discovered the world of two women who cooked with the seasons, which became the focus of the book. He later moved with his wife, Kathryn, and his seeing-eye dog companion, Nusta, to the Westbeth Artists' Colony in Greenwich Village.

De Groot died in New York City of a self-inflicted gunshot wound, reportedly as a result of depression caused by his failing health. His wife died of a stroke at age 88 on March 27, 1993.

== Quote ==
"The 'perfect marriage' of food and wine should allow for infidelity".

== Bibliography ==
- How I Reduced with the New Rockefeller Diet (Part 1. The Rockefeller Diet; Part 2. The Diet for Gourmets) (published by Horizon Press, 1956)
- Esquire's Handbook for Hosts (published 1953 and later revised by de Groot)
- Feasts for All Seasons (published 1966)
- The Auberge of the Flowering Hearth (published 1973)
- Revolutionizing French Cooking (published 1976)
- Cooking with the Cuisinart Food Processor (published 1977)
- Pressure Cookery Perfected (published 1978)
- The Wines of California, The Pacific Northwest & New York (published 1982)
- In Search of the Perfect Meal: A Collection of the Best Food Writing of Roy Andries De Groot (published 1986)
