= Cécile Ines Loos =

Swiss writer (1883–1959)

- Born: 4 February 1883; Basel, Switzerland
- Died: 21 January 1959 (aged 75); Basel, Switzerland
- Occupation: Writer

Cécile Ines Loos (4 February 1883 – 21 January 1959) was a Swiss writer. She was born and died in Basel. She has been called "one of the most important recent rediscoveries in Swiss literature".

== Life ==
Cécile Ines Loos was born on 4 February 1883 in Basel, Switzerland. Her father was a German organist and her mother was from upper-class Basel society. Loos was their fifth child. Her mother died when she was aged two, and she was brought up by a friend of her mother's. Her father died shortly after, in 1887. Unfortunately her foster mother died in childbirth in 1892, and Loos was placed in a strict religious orphanage near Berne. Loos began writing poetry in the orphanage, which she left in 1900 to become a governess. She worked in Switzerland and England, before in August 1911 giving birth to an illegitimate son in Milan. Her son spent his childhood in foster care and orphanages, as Loos lacked the means to support them both.

Loos returned to Basel in 1921, where she worked did waitressing and secretarial work, and worked in a library. She studied astrology and religion, and in 1929 published her first novel, Matka Boska in Germany. The book tells the story of a poor Polish peasant and her illegitimate daughter. Matka Boska and Loos's second novel Die Rätsel der Turandot were both commercially successful, but less so her later works, after she lost her German publisher. She lived the rest of her life in poverty, but continued to write, and some consider two novels from this period her finest work, Hinter dem Mond (Behind the Moon) and Der Tod und das Püppchen (Death and the doll).

In 1991 Loos was called "one of the most important recent rediscoveries in Swiss literature".

She died on 21 January 1959 in Basel.

== Works ==
- "Matka Boska", 1929
- “Die Rätsel der Turandot” (The riddles of Turandot), 1931
- "Die leisen Leidenschaften. Ein Lied der Freundschaft" (The quiet passions. A song of friendship), 1934
- “Der Tod und das Püppchen” (Death and the dolly), 1938
- "Hinter dem Mond" (Behind the Moon), 1942
- "Konradin. Das summende Lied der Arbeit von Vater, Sohn und Enkel" (Konradin. The humming song of father, son and grandson), 1943
- "Jehanne", 1946
- "Die Freundin" (The girlfriend), 1950
- "Schlafende Prinzessinnen. Erzählung" (Sleeping princesses. Narrative), 1950
- "Leute am See" (People at the lake), 1951
- "Verzauberte Welt. Ein Lesebuch" (Enchanted world. A reading book)
- "Erzählungen" (Stories)
