= Laura Spinney =

British science writer

- Born: 1971 (age 54–55)
- Education: Durham University (BSc)
- Scientific career
- Fields: Spanish flu Pandemics
- Workplaces: Max Planck Institute for the History of Science
- Website: www.lauraspinney.com

Laura Spinney (born August 1971) is a British science journalist, novelist, and non-fiction writer whose 2017 book Pale Rider is an account of the 1918 influenza pandemic.

== Education ==
Spinney graduated with a Bachelor of Science degree in Natural Sciences from Durham University in 1993.

== Career ==
Spinney has written for Nature, National Geographic, The Economist, New Scientist, and The Guardian. She is the author of two novels, The Doctor and The Quick, and a collection of oral history from a central European city entitled Rue Centrale.

In 2017 she published Pale Rider, an account of the 1918 flu pandemic, published by Jonathan Cape who acquired the global rights in an auction in 2015. Spinney indicates that the global pandemic was the biggest disaster of the 20th century, exceeding the death tolls of both World War I (17 million) and World War II (60 million dead). Its full scope has only been recognised in the 21st century as researchers have examined old records, determining that 1 in 3 people became ill and between 1 in 10 and 1 in 5 died. At the time illiteracy was common, germ theory relatively new, antibiotics had not been discovered, and long-distance communication was often limited.

The first clearly identified and documented case was Albert Gitchell, a U.S. Army cook who reported in sick at Camp Funston in Kansas on 4 March 1918. Three distinct waves of disease outbreak occurred worldwide: in spring 1918, in late summer and autumn, and from later winter 1918 to early 1919. Between the first and second waves, the virus mutated and became more deadly in humans. The death toll in countries like China and India was particularly poorly documented. Spinney vividly describes conditions from all over the globe, from Rio de Janeiro to Russia.

Spinney's English translation of Swiss writer Charles-Ferdinand Ramuz's novel Derborence was published in 2018. In 2019 she spent two months as a journalist-in-residence at the Max Planck Institute for the History of Science in Berlin, Germany.

== Bibliography ==
=== Books ===
- The Doctor
- The Quick
- Rue Centrale
- Pale Rider: The Spanish Flu of 1918 and How it Changed the World
- Derborence: Where the devils came down
- Proto: How One Ancient Language Went Global

=== Articles ===
- "Biotechnology: "Biotechnology in Crops: Issues for the Developing World" by Laura Spinney for Oxfam GB". San Francisco State University. 13 January 1998.
- H.M. The Economist, 2008.
- "Goggle eyed". New Scientist. 224 (2990): 42–45. 11 October 2014.
- "Disease naming must change to avoid scapegoating and politics". Aeon Essays.
- How Facebook, fake news and friends are warping your memory
- "Did Human Sacrifice Help People Form Complex Societies?". The Atlantic. 27 February 2018.
- "Unearthed: Why we've got monuments like Stonehenge all wrong". New Scientist. 8 January 2018.

== Personal life ==
Spinney lives in Paris, France.
