= Charles Ferdinand Ramuz =

Swiss writer (1878–1947)

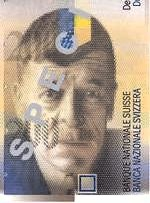
- Ramuz on a 200-francs Swiss banknote.
- Born: 24 September 1878; Lausanne, Switzerland
- Died: 23 May 1947 (aged 68); Lausanne, Switzerland
- Education: University of Lausanne
- Occupations: Novelist, poet
- Spouse: Cécille Cellier (1872–1956)
- Writing career
- Period: 1903–1947
- Notable work: La Grande Peur dans la Montagne

Charles Ferdinand Ramuz (24 September 1878 – 23 May 1947) was a French-speaking Swiss writer.

== Biography ==
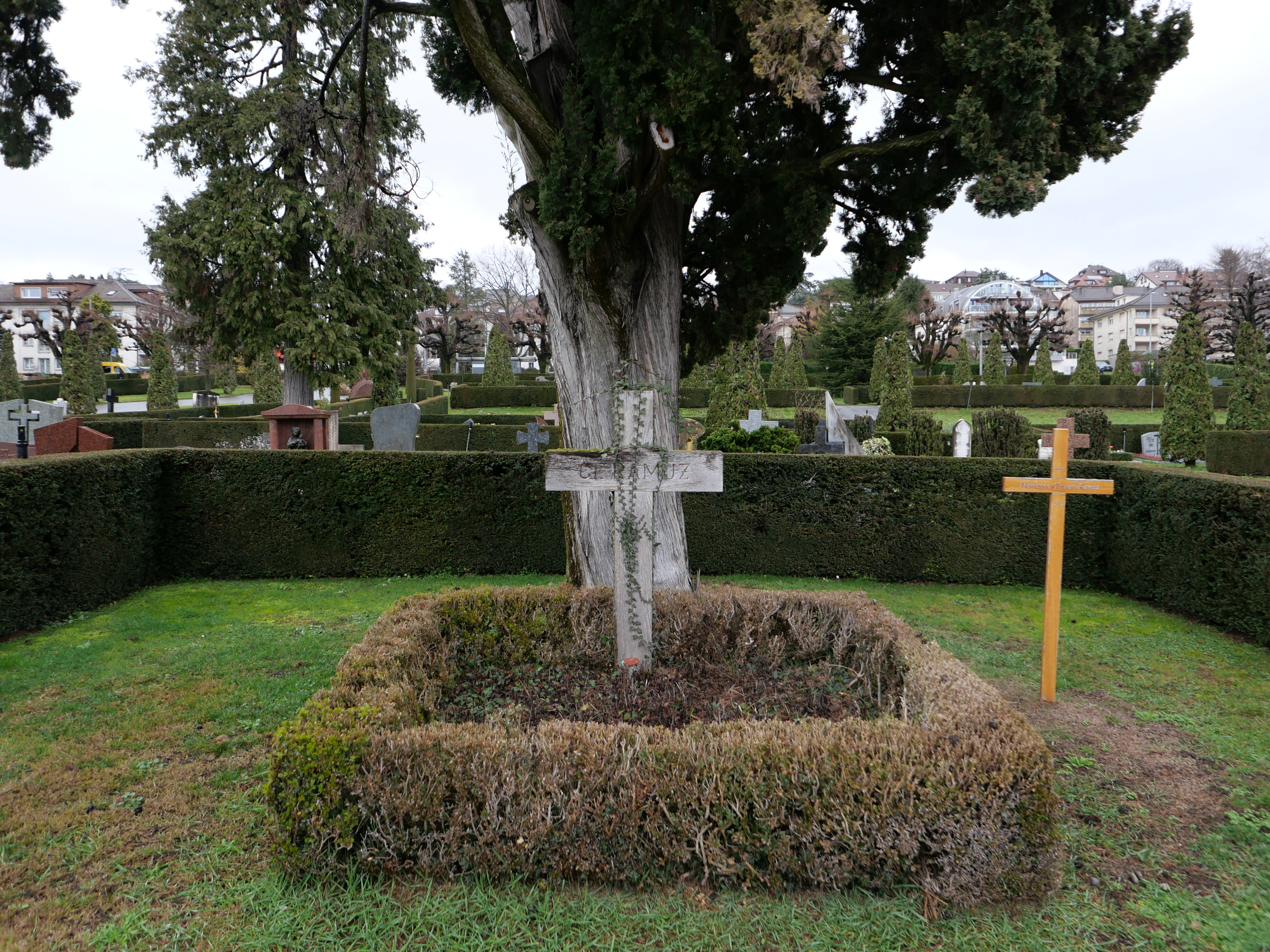
The grave of Ramuz and his daughter Marianne Olivieri-Ramuz (1913–2012) at the cemetery of Pully.

He was born in Lausanne in the canton of Vaud and was educated at the University of Lausanne. He taught briefly in nearby Aubonne, and then in Weimar, Germany. In 1903, he left for Paris and remained there until World War I, with frequent trips home to Switzerland. As part of his studies in Paris he wrote a thesis on the poet Maurice de Guérin. In 1903, he published Le petit village, a collection of poems.

In 1914, he returned to Switzerland.

He wrote the libretto for Igor Stravinsky's Histoire du soldat.

He died in Pully, near Lausanne in 1947. His likeness and an artistic impression of his works appear on the 200 Swiss franc note (no longer in current use).

The Foundation C.F. Ramuz in Pully awards the Grand Prix C. F. Ramuz.

== Works ==
- Le petit village (1903)
- Aline (1905)
- Jean-Luc persécuté (1909)
- Aimé Pache, peintre vaudois (1911)
- Vie de Samuel Belet (1913)
- Raison d'être (1914)
- La Guerre dans le Haut Pays (1915)
- Le règne de l'esprit malin (1917) / The Reign of the Evil One, translated by James Whitall (Onesuch Press, 2014)
- La guérison des malades (1917)
- Les signes parmi nous (1919)
- Salutation paysanne (1919)
- Terre du ciel (1921)
- Présence de la mort (1922) / translated as The End of All Men, by Allan Ross Macdougall (Pantheon Books Inc., 1944) and as Into the Sun, by Olivia Baes and Emma Ramadan (New Directions, 2025)
- La séparation des races (1922)
- Passage du poète (1923)
- L'amour du monde (1925)
- Chant de notre Rhône.(1920) / Riversong of the Rhone, translated by Patti M. Marxsen (Onesuch Press, 2015)
- La grande peur dans la montagne (1926) / Terror on the Mountain, translated by Milton Stansbury (Harcourt, Brace & World, 1967) / Great Fear on the Mountain, translated by Bill Johnston (Archipelago Books, 2024)
- La beauté sur la terre (1927) / Beauty on Earth, translated by Michelle Bailat-Jones (Onesuch Press, 2014)
- Adam et Eve (1932)
- Farinet, ou la fausse monnaie (1932)
- Derborence (1934) / When the Mountain Fell, translated by Sarah Fisher Scott (Pantheon Books, 1947)
- Questions (1935)
- Le garçon savoyard (1936)
- Taille de l'homme (1937)
- Besoin de grandeur (1937)
- Si le soleil ne revenait pas... (1937) / What If the Sun..., translated by Michelle Bailat-Jones (Onesuch Press, 2015)
- Paris, notes d'un vaudois (1938)
- Découverte du monde (1939)
- La guerre aux papiers (1942)
- René Auberjonois (1943)
- Nouvelles (1944)

== Film adaptations ==
Ramuz's 1922 novel La séparation des races was adapted into the 1933 film Rapt by director Dimitri Kirsanoff. The film, shot on location in Switzerland, starred Geymond Vital. The Swiss writer S. Corinna Bille was a script editor on the film, after which she moved to Paris with Vital and married him. The movie is best known for the musical score by Arthur Honegger.

In 1998, Swiss director Francis Reusser adapted Ramuz's 1915 novel La Guerre dans le Haut Pays into a film titled War in the Highlands, starring French actress Marion Cotillard.

== Personal life ==
Ramuz married Cecile Cellier, a Swiss painter, in 1913 after she became pregnant with their only child, Marianne. He had one grandson, Guido Olivieri (b.1940).

== Legacy ==
His life and literary work are presented in a museum in his former home, La Muette, in Pully, Switzerland.

== Awards ==
- 1927 Prix Gottfried Keller

== See also ==
- Swiss literature
