= L'Auberge (restaurant) =

Restaurant information
- Head chef: Emmanuel Mertens
- Rating: Michelin Guide
- Location: Wilhelminasingel 76-80, Weert, Netherlands
- Other information: Restaurant closed in 1999

L'Auberge is a defunct restaurant located in Weert in the Netherlands. It was a fine dining restaurant that was awarded one Michelin star in the period 1986-1991 and two Michelin stars in the period 1992–2000. The restaurant closed down due to bankruptcy. According to the Volkskrant, the restaurant building itself and its appearance, rather than its kitchen, would preclude the restaurant from obtaining a third Michelin star.

After moving to a new location in 1996, and the divorce of maître d'hôtel Willy Mertens and head chef Emmanuel Mertens, resulting in the departure of Willy Mertens, restaurant guide Lekker gave the restaurant a strong negative review in 1998. The restaurant was sold in 1999.

Mertens was later awarded a Michelin star again with Restaurant Mertens in Hamburg, Germany. One of the young chefs working and training in L'Auberge was Jonnie Boer, later owner and head chef of De Librije.

== See also ==
- List of Michelin starred restaurants in the Netherlands
