= Jurriaan ten Doesschate =

Dutch ophthalmologist (1912–1977)

- Born: October 31, 1912; Utrecht, Netherlands
- Died: November 3, 1977 (aged 65); Zeist, Netherlands
- Education: Utrecht University
- Scientific career
- Fields: ophthalmology
- Workplaces: Utrecht University, Ooglijdersgasthuis

Jurriaan ten Doesschate (Utrecht, October 31, 1912 – Zeist, November 3, 1977) was a Dutch ophthalmologist and medical scientist, who specialized in physiological optics.

== Biography ==
The son of ophthalmologist and art historian Gezienus ten Doesschate and of linguist Amelia Hermina Henrietta Kortebosch, he attended the Municipal Gymnasium in Utrecht before studying medicine in the same city (1930–38).

Despite (or perhaps because) he lost an eye in a youthful accident, ten Doesschate followed in the footsteps of his father. He established an ophthalmological practice in Zeist in 1942, the same year in which he obtained his doctorate in medicine with a dissertation on “Physiologisch-optische beschouwingen betreffende de visueele beoordeling van Röntgenphotogrammen” (Physiological-optical aspects of the visual assessment of radiographs). Two years earlier, he had married Anna Aleida Ameling, a fellow medical student at the University of Utrecht. Together they had four children.

In 1949, he became chef de clinique of the Ooglijdersgasthuis (Netherlands Hospital for Eye Patients), which had been founded by Franciscus Cornelis Donders in 1858. Ten years later, he succeeded H.J.M. Weve as director of that hospital, a function that was coupled with a professorship in ophthalmology at the University of Utrecht medical faculty.

In 1964-65, ten Doesschate was awarded the Netherlands Visiting Professorship at the University of Michigan in Ann Arbor, established in 1950. Here he collaborated with Mathew Alpern, a physiologist in the Vision Research Laboratory at the university's Medical School. Together they worked on the physiology of color vision and published a number of articles (see bibliography below). A meningioma, diagnosed and removed in 1970, severely reduced his vision and eventually necessitated his early retirement. He died in 1977 in a car accident.

== Bibliography ==
=== Significant papers ===
- ten Doesschate, J., 1942. Physiologisch-optische beschouwingen betreffende de visueele beoordeeling van röntgenphotogrammen...
- ten Doesschate, J. & Alpern, M., 1967a. Effect of photoexcitation of the two retinas on pupil size. Journal of neurophysiology, 30(3), pp. 562–576.
- ten Doesschate, J. & Alpern, M., 1967b. Influence of asymmetrical photoexcitation of the two retinas on pupil size. Journal of neurophysiology, 30(3), pp. 577–585.
- ten Doesschate, J. & Alpern, M., 1965. Response of the pupil to steady-state retinal illumination: Contribution by cones. Science. Available at: http://psycnet.apa.org/psycinfo/1965-14214-001 [Accessed October 31, 2012].
