= Gezienus ten Doesschate =

Dutch painter

Gezienus (or Gesinus) ten Doesschate (11 August 1885 in Zwolle – 9 March 1965 in Utrecht) was a Dutch ophthalmologist, amateur painter and historian.

He was active as an amateur painter in Utrecht under the pseudonym Thomas Denier. He had good contacts with the cultural elite of Utrecht around the First World War and was good friends with the painters Janus de Winter and Erich Wichman. In 1916 he was briefly a member of de Anderen, a Dutch artists' group that included Theo van Doesburg, but dropped out in support of de Winter, another artists group.

At the end of his life he contributed to a number of medical-historical books concerning the University of Utrecht.

His son was Jurriaan ten Doesschate (1912–1977), ophthalmologist and medical scientist
