= Francis Reusser =

Swiss film director (1942–2020)

- Born: 1 December 1942; Vevey, Switzerland
- Died: 10 April 2020 (aged 77)
- Occupations: Film director; screenwriter; editor; cinematographer
- Years active: 1964-2018

Francis Reusser (1 December 1942 – 10 April 2020) was a Swiss film director, screenwriter, cinematographer and editor. He directed 26 films since 1964. His film Derborence was entered into the 1985 Cannes Film Festival. Reusser died on 10 April 2020 after a long illness. His film War in the Highlands (1998) competed for the Golden Bear at the 1999 Berlin Film Festival.

== Selected filmography ==
- Anthony et Cleopatra (1964)
- Le grand soir (1976)
- Seuls (1981)
- Derborence (1985)
- War in the Highlands (1998)

== Awards ==
- 1976: Locarno Festival - Golden Leopard for Le Grand Soir
- 1986: César Awards for Best French Language Film at 11th César Awards for Derborence
