= Artstor =

Non-profit digital art archive

Artstor is a nonprofit organization that builds and distributes the Digital Library, an online resource of more than 2.5 million images in the arts, architecture, humanities, and sciences, and Shared Shelf, a Web-based cataloging and image management software service that allows institutions to catalog, edit, store, and share local collections.

== History ==
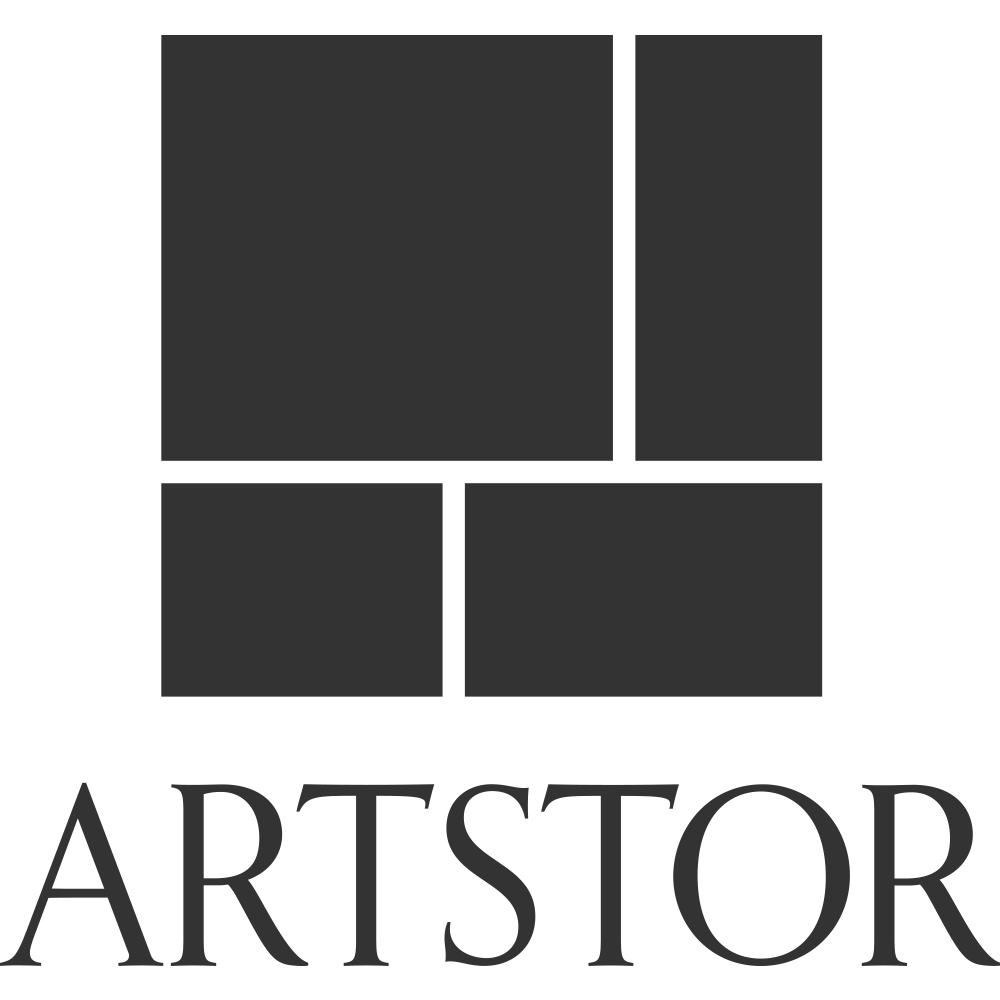
Artstor logo

Since 2003, the organization has been an independent non-profit 501(C)(3) organization based in New York. Starting in 2016, it joined in a strategic alliance with Ithaka Harbors, which currently operates the services JSTOR, Portico, and Ithaka S+R.

In the late 1990s, as universities and libraries began to convert their slide libraries into local digital image databases, Artstor was created to address the growing need for a shared online image library that would be accessible to educational institutions worldwide. The Artstor Digital Library is intended to reduce redundant efforts of scanning and cataloging thousands of the same images from multiple repositories, and also to enable new digital image collections to be shared for teaching and research. The initiative paired innovative digital image and online technologies with Mellon Foundation's ongoing mission to support higher education, museums, the arts, and art conservation to “bring about a substantial transformation in art-related teaching, learning, and research.”

In 2024, the Artstor platform and content became available as part of the JSTOR platform as part of JSTOR's broader multimedia content offerings.

Artstor's primary goals as an organization are: to assemble image collections from across many time periods and cultures; to create an organized, central, and reliable digital resource that supports strictly non-commercial use of images for research, teaching and learning; and to work with the arts and educational communities to develop collective solutions for building, managing and sharing digital images for educational use. Like many non-profits, Artstor has a mixed business model; some services are provided on a fee basis (geared toward the size of the subscribing institution) and others are provided free of charge to the community.

== Digital Library ==
The Artstor Digital Library includes a set of software tools to view, present, and manage images for research and teaching purposes. There are currently more than 1,500 Artstor institutional subscribers in over 45 countries, including colleges and universities, museums, libraries, primary and secondary schools, and other non-profit organizations. The Artstor Digital Library offers a wide range of images needed for interdisciplinary teaching and research, including contributions from the leading museums, photo archives, libraries, scholars, photographers, artists, and artists’ estates. These diverse collections include: Magnum Photos, Carnegie Arts of the United States, The Illustrated Bartsch, the Mellon International Dunhuang Archive, The Huntington Archive of Asian Art, and The Museum of Modern Art (MoMA) Architecture and Design Collection, the Metropolitan Museum of Art, the Bodleian Library, and more.

The Digital Library comprises more than one million images from hundreds of collections worldwide. The Digital Library is continually expanded by new contributions such as: Mark Rothko Estate; Latin American Art (Cisneros Collection); San Francisco Museum of Modern Art (SFMOMA); Christopher Roy: African Art and Architecture; Berlin State Museums; the Gernsheim Corpus of Master Drawings (185,000 images of old master drawings); Larry Qualls Archive (100,000 images documenting 30 years of New York City gallery exhibitions); architectural photography from Esto, Canyonlights and ART on FILE; university collections from Harvard and Yale; and historical photo archives such as the National Gallery of Art and Frick Art Reference Library, among many others.

Tools and features

Artstor users have the ability to search, organize, present, upload, and share images. In addition to keyword and advanced searching, users may browse works by geography, classification, or collection name. Users can zoom in on high-resolution images in the image viewer and review related information in image data records. They can also export images for use in classroom presentations and other non-commercial, educational uses, either as JPEGs, or presentations for PowerPoint 2007. Artstor has also developed the Offline Image Viewer (OIV), an alternative tool for giving offline classroom presentations. OIV allows users to download much larger images from Artstor, combine Artstor images with their own content to create digital slide show presentations that feature side-by-side comparisons, zooming and panning, and the ability to customize text on the slides. OIV enables instructors to give reliable classroom presentations using both high-resolution Artstor images and local content without being connected to the Internet. The Artstor Digital Library is accessible through Apple iPad, iPhone, iPod Touch, and Android-powered devices, providing read-only features such as searching and browsing, zooming, and viewing saved image groups.

== Shared Shelf ==
Artstor also provides Shared Shelf, a Web-based cataloging and digital media management software service that allows institutions to catalog, edit, store, and share local collections. Shared Shelf was launched in 2011. Artstor worked with ten institutional partners to develop this service: Bard College, Colby College, Cornell University, Harvard University, Middlebury College, New York University, Society of Architectural Historians, University of Illinois Urbana-Champaign, University of Miami, and Yale University.

== Other initiatives ==
As part of Artstor's mission of using digital technologies to further education, scholarship, and research worldwide, the organization collaborates with other institutions in the community to offer a number of services, many of them free.

Digital Public Library of America (DPLA)

Through a collaboration with Artstor, the Digital Public Library of America (DPLA) is providing free access to more than 10,000 high-quality images and data records from six leading museums: the Dallas Museum of Art, the Indianapolis Museum of Art, the Samuel H. Kress Collection at the National Gallery of Art, the Walters Art Museum, the Yale Center for British Art and the Yale University Art Gallery.

Images for Academic Publishing (IAP)

Artstor's Images for Academic Publishing (IAP) program makes available publication-quality images for use in scholarly publications free of charge. The IAP program was initiated by the Metropolitan Museum of Art in 2007 and is now available as an optional service to all museums who contribute images to the Artstor Digital Library. Scholars can access these images through the Artstor Digital Library at subscribing institutions or can request free access to IAP by contacting Artstor.

Current IAP contributors include Frank Cancian (University of California, Irvine) (forthcoming), Dallas Museum of Art, Getty Research Institute, Indianapolis Museum of Art, Mellink Archive (Bryn Mawr College), Metropolitan Museum of Art, Northwestern University Library, Princeton University Art Museum (forthcoming), the Walters Art Museum, and the Yale University Art Gallery.

Built Works Registry (BWR)

Artstor and the Avery Architectural and Fine Arts Library at Columbia University are collaborating on the creation of the Built Works Registry (BWR), a community-generated data resource for architectural works and the built environment. The BWR's goal is to create the system and tools to enable the gathering and widespread dissemination of a large and growing body of built works information. It will serve scholars, students, educators, librarians, and catalogers from academic and cultural heritage organizations worldwide, and will be openly accessible to the general public. The project is supported by a three-year National Leadership grant awarded by the Institute of Museum and Library Services (IMLS).

The Getty Research Institute (GRI), nine other institutions, and an international advisory board will also participate throughout the three-year project development cycle. BWR data will be contributed to the Getty Vocabulary Program’s Cultural Objects Name Authority (CONA) and will be a critical component to the controlled vocabulary warehouse in Shared Shelf.

Society of Architectural Historians Architecture Resources Archive (SAHARA)

The SAH Architecture Resources Archive (SAHARA), an online library of architectural and landscape images for research and teaching, is a collaboration among The Society of Architectural Historians (SAH), scholars of architectural history, librarians, and Artstor, funded by a grant from The Andrew W. Mellon Foundation.

EMET (Embedded Metadata Extraction Tool)

EMET is a software tool that is freely available for download as a stand-alone application. EMET is intended to facilitate management and preservation of digital images and their incorporation into external databases and applications. EMET was created by Artstor through funding from the National Digital Information Infrastructure and Preservation Program (NDIIPP). For programmers interested in reviewing and customizing the code, EMET is also available as an open source application on SourceForge.
