= Canton of Duclair =

Coordinates: 49°27′33″N 0°53′02″E

Duclair
- Former canton
- Interactive map of Duclair
- Country: France
- Region: Normandy
- Department: Seine-Maritime
- No. of communes: {{{nbcomm}}}
- Disbanded: 2015
- Area: 191.07 km^{2} (73.77 sq mi)
- Population (2012): 25,132
  - Density: 131.53/km^{2} (340.67/sq mi)

The Canton of Duclair is a former canton situated in the Seine-Maritime département and in the Haute-Normandie region of northern France. It was disbanded following the French canton reorganisation which came into effect in March 2015. It consisted of 17 communes, which joined the canton of Barentin in 2015. It had a total of 25,132 inhabitants (2012).

== Geography ==
An area of farmland, forestry, quarrying and light industry in the arrondissement of Rouen, centred on the town of Duclair. The altitude varies from 0m (Jumièges) to 134m (Saint-Martin-de-Boscherville) with an average altitude of 57m.

The canton comprised 17 communes:

- Anneville-Ambourville
- Bardouville
- Berville-sur-Seine
- Duclair
- Épinay-sur-Duclair
- Hénouville
- Jumièges
- Mauny
- Le Mesnil-sous-Jumièges
- Quevillon
- Sainte-Marguerite-sur-Duclair
- Saint-Martin-de-Boscherville
- Saint-Paër
- Saint-Pierre-de-Varengeville
- Le Trait
- Yainville
- Yville-sur-Seine

== Population ==
Historical population Canton of Duclair
Year	1962	1968	1975	1982	1990	1999
Pop.	17,624	18,447	20,057	22,313	23,554	24,402
±%	—	+4.7%	+8.7%	+11.2%	+5.6%	+3.6%
From the year 1962 on: No double counting – residents of multiple communes (e.g. students and military personnel) are counted only once. Source: INSEE

== See also ==
- Arrondissements of the Seine-Maritime department
- Cantons of the Seine-Maritime department
- Communes of the Seine-Maritime department
