= Communauté de communes Seine-Austreberthe =

Coordinates: 49.5023°N 0.9293°E

Seine-Austreberthe
- Former communauté de communes
- Interactive map of Seine-Austreberthe
- Country: France
- Region: Normandy
- Department: Seine-Maritime
- No. of communes: {{{nbcomm}}}
- Established: 1998
- Disbanded: 2010
- Area: 159 km^{2} (61 sq mi)
- Population (2006): 18,365
  - Density: 116/km^{2} (299/sq mi)

The Communauté de communes of Seine-Austreberthe was located in the Seine-Maritime département in the Normandy region of northern France. It was created in January 1998. It was merged into the new Communauté d'agglomération Rouen-Elbeuf-Austreberthe in January 2010.

== Participants ==
The commune community comprised the following 14 communes:

- Anneville-Ambourville
- Bardouville
- Berville-sur-Seine
- Duclair
- Épinay-sur-Duclair
- Hénouville
- Jumièges
- Le Mesnil-sous-Jumièges
- Quevillon
- Sainte-Marguerite-sur-Duclair
- Saint-Martin-de-Boscherville
- Saint-Paër
- Saint-Pierre-de-Varengeville
- Yville-sur-Seine

== See also ==
- Communes of the Seine-Maritime department
