= Duclair (disambiguation) =

Duclair may refer to:

- Duclair, commune in Seine-Maritime, France
- Canton of Duclair, canton in Seine-Maritime, France
- Duclair duck, duck breed named after the commune of Duclair in Seine-Maritime, France
- Anthony Duclair (born 1995), Canadian ice hockey player
- Farell Duclair (born 1972), Canadian football player

== See also ==
- Épinay-sur-Duclair, commune in Seine-Maritime, France
- Sainte-Marguerite-sur-Duclair, commune in Seine-Maritime, France
