= Pierre Villette =

French composer (1926–1998)

Pierre Villette (French pronunciation: [pjɛʁ vilɛt]; 7 February 1926 – 6 March 1998) was a French composer of choral and instrumental music.

Villette was born into a musical family in 1926 at Duclair, Normandy. He studied with Maurice Duruflé before attending the Paris Conservatoire. Pierre Boulez was a fellow student but their careers followed very different paths. In 1957, Villette was appointed director of the Conservatoire in Besançon, the capital of the Franche-Comté region. He was dogged by ill health and had a lung removed while still in his twenties. His bad health forced him to move from mountainous Besançon to a warmer climate, and he became director of the Academy at Aix en Provence in 1967. He held this position until he retired in 1987, and he continued to live in Provence until his death in 1998.

Villette's music is a product of a French musical heritage that includes Fauré and Debussy as well as Poulenc and Messiaen, and a French cultural legacy that includes Catholicism and the Order of Saint Benedict. Villette was not interested in the avant-garde direction taken by Boulez's circle, and instead his music drew on influences as eclectic as Gregorian Chant, medieval music, jazz (he composed an orchestral piece titled "Blues"), and Stravinsky. His catalogue has eighty-one opus numbers, (full list via this link) and he wrote chamber and orchestral music as well as better-known choral works.

Villette's compositions are performed around the world. His choral music was championed in England by Dr Donald Hunt in the 1970s when he was director of Worcester Cathedral Choir, and Villette's "Hymne à la Vierge", which is probably his best-known work, has been performed in the annual Service of Nine Lessons and Carols at King's College, Cambridge. Choirs in the US, Japan, and Germany are also familiar with Villette's compositions.
