= Abbey of Saint-Georges, Boscherville =

Benedictine abbey in Seine-Maritime, France

Coordinates: 49°26′39″N 0°57′52″E

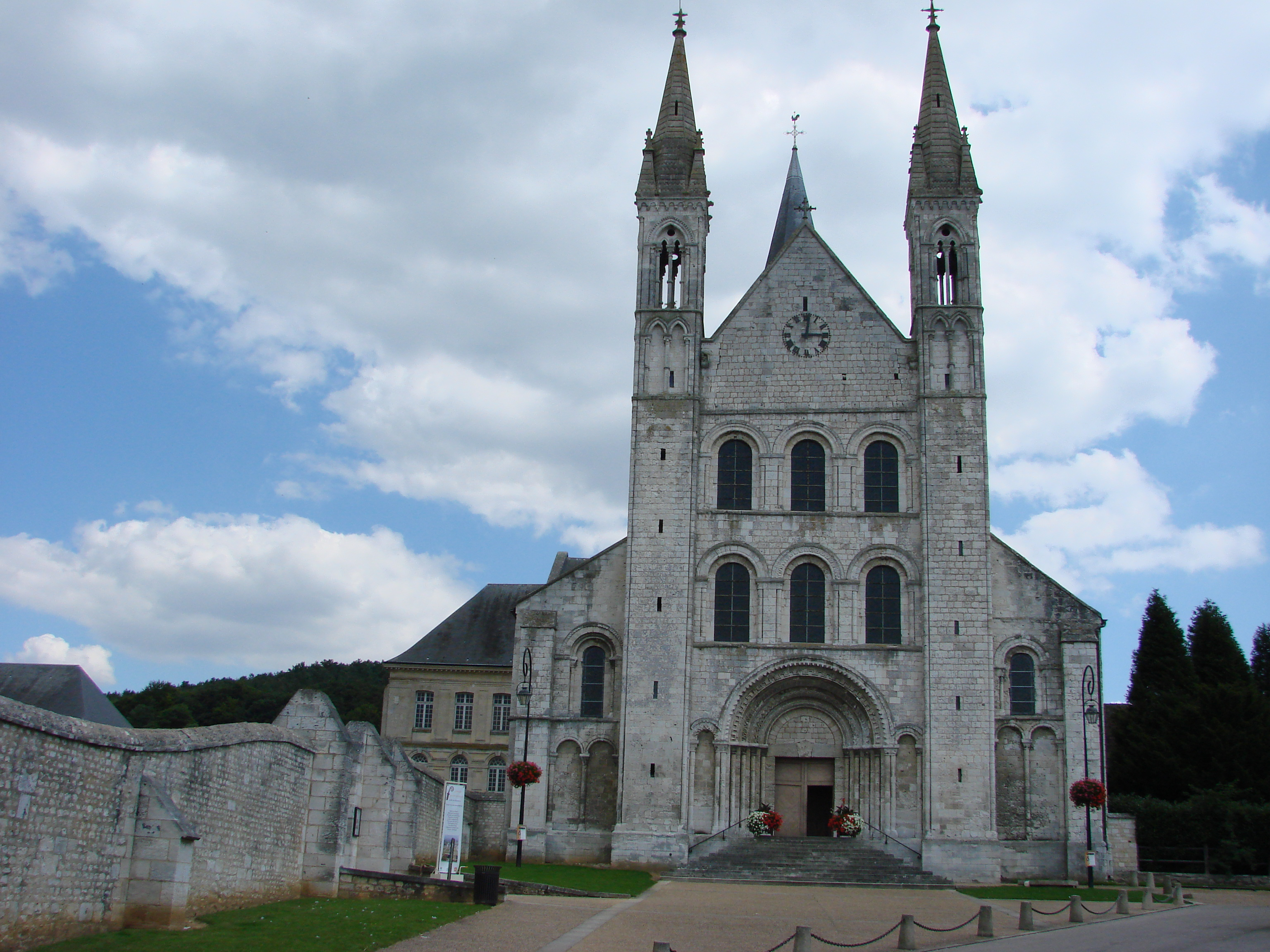
Abbey church

The Abbey of Saint-Georges, Boscherville, is a former Benedictine abbey located in the commune of Saint-Martin-de-Boscherville, in Seine-Maritime, France.

It was founded in about 1113 on the site of an earlier establishment of secular canons and settled by monks from the Abbey of Saint-Evroul.

== History ==
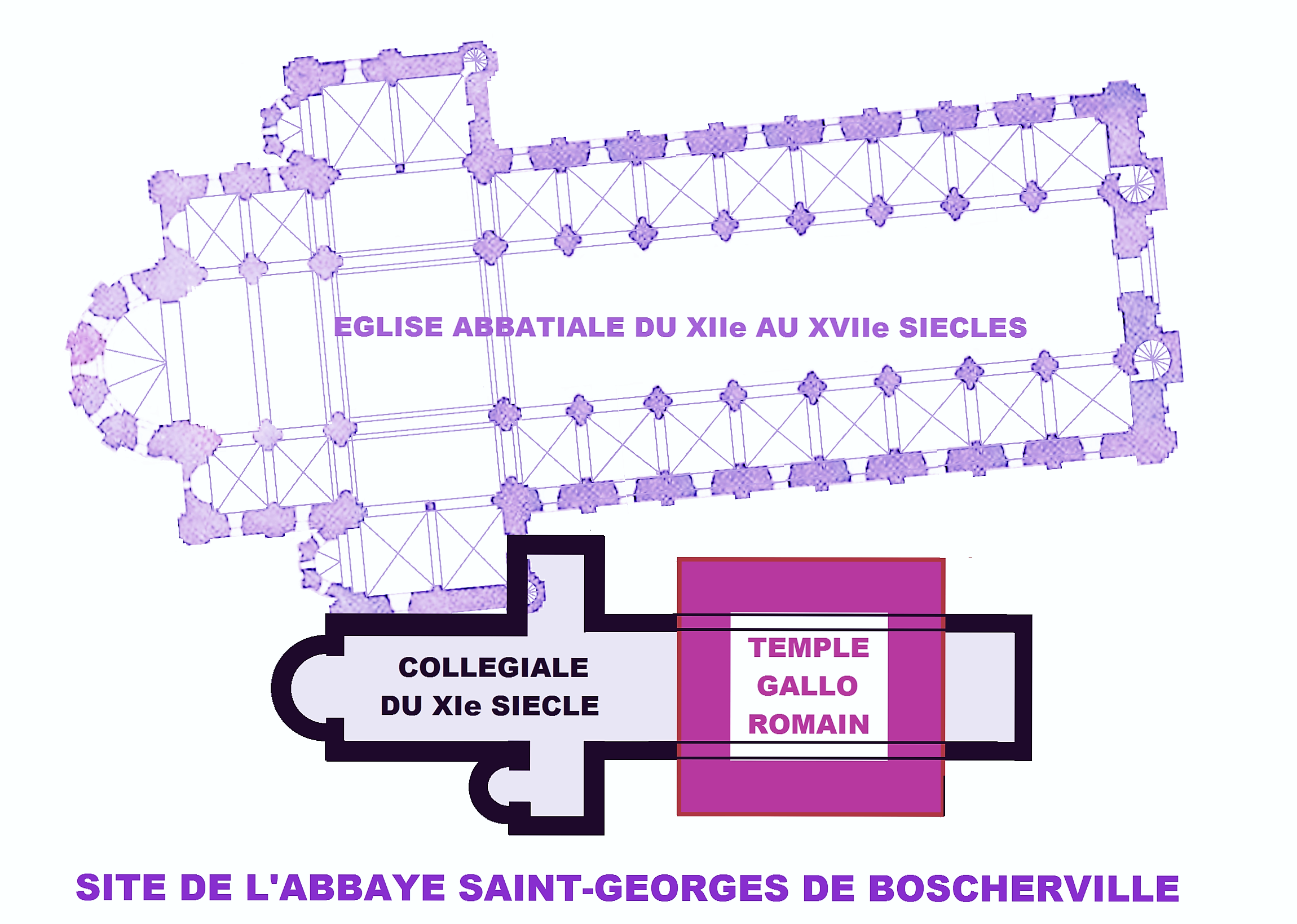
site plan of the three structures

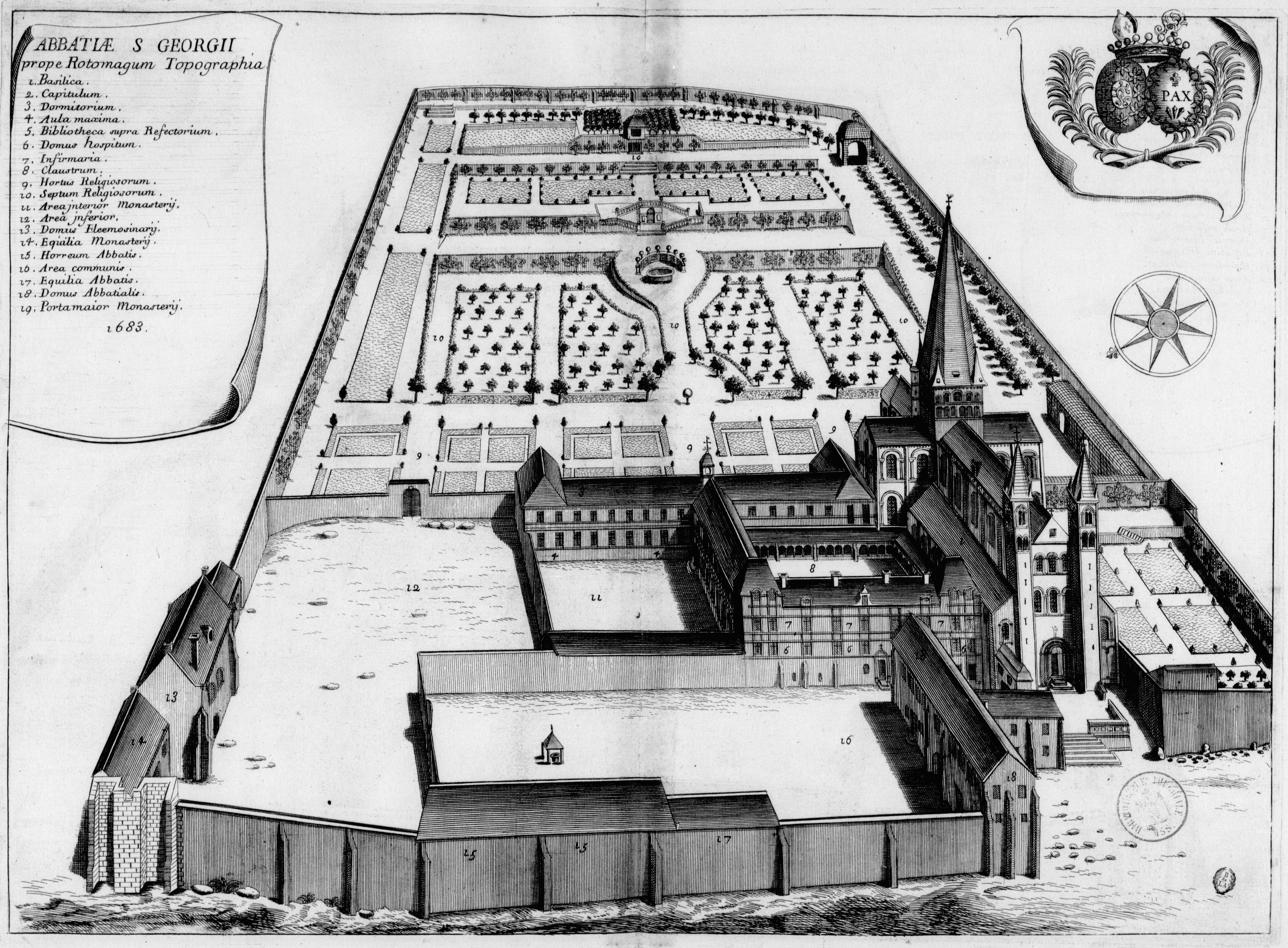
view of the Abbey in 1683.

The first occupation of the site where the abbey will be built dates back to the Gallo-Roman era when a square temple with a wooden gallery was built in the 1st century AD. It was replaced in the 2nd century by a fanum then, during the Frankish period, by a funerary chapel installed in the cella of the fanum. The site was occupied from the 1st to the 3rd century, then, from the 7th century, by several Christian buildings which are at the origin of the abbey.

In 1055, Raoul de Tancarville or Raoul-le-Chambellan installed a community of canons in the small funeral chapel, 15.50 m long by 7.50 m wide. The chapel became too small for the community, the collegiate church, dedicated to Saint George, was built on the site of the temple and the fanum, its choir with a flat apse is under the current chapter house and it had a small cloister. A charter-sign of 1080 describes the works with precision.

At first, the canons teach and preach with the support of the aristocracy then, having become rich and powerful, attract the hostility of their benefactors. Their role does not resist the rise of monasticism with its values of poverty and community life. Like the collegiate church of Boscherville, around thirty Norman collegiate churches disappeared.

In 1113 or 1114, Guillaume de Tancarville, chamberlain of King Henry I Beauclerc drove them out to found the Abbey of Saint-Georges de Boscherville.

Before the French Revolution, the church contained the tombs of its founders and benefactors. In 1823 there were two pits between the choir and the apse covered with paintings with coats of arms where two members of these families were buried. In front of the high altar was the tombstone of Abbé Antoine Le Roux.

== Heritage Listing ==
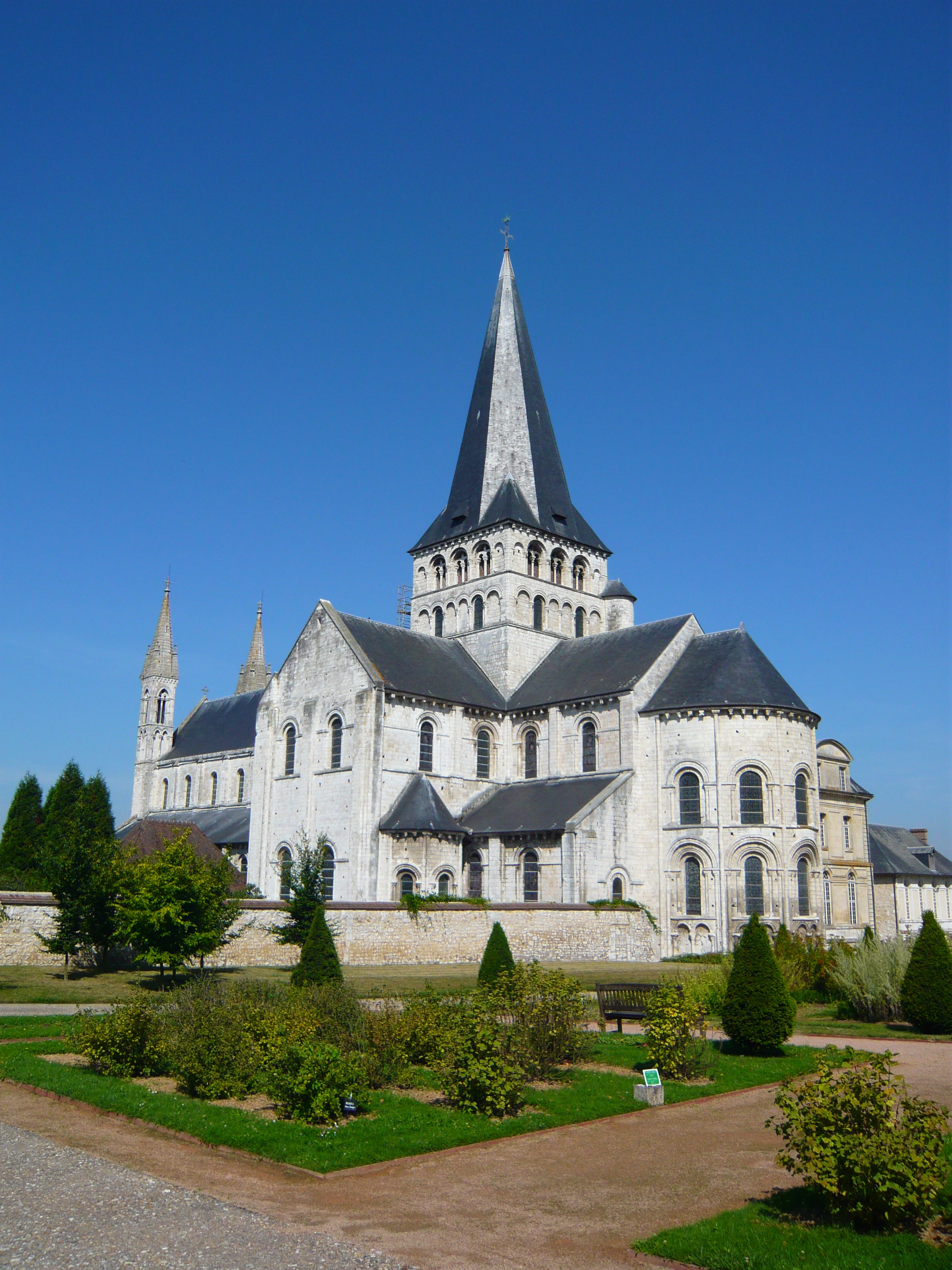
Modern view of the church.

Classification: Abbey church (12th century) with lantern tower and organ (1627)17 listed as a historical monument in 1840, funerary slab of Antoine Le Roux (1535) The church is subject to multiple protections as historical monuments1: classification of the church by the list of 1840, classification of the cloister in 1862, classification of the chapter house in 1875, registration of cadastral plots in 1987 and classification of various buried remains as well as various buildings remaining in 1989.
