= Mauny, Seine-Maritime =

Mauny
- Commune
- Coat of arms
- Location of Mauny
- Location within France Location within Normandy
- Coordinates: 49°23′06″N 0°53′09″E
- Country: France
- Region: Normandy
- Department: Seine-Maritime
- Arrondissement: Rouen
- Canton: Barentin

Government
  - Mayor (2020–2026): Charly Noël
- Area^{1}: 10.19 km^{2} (3.93 sq mi)
- Elevation: 117 m (384 ft)
- Highest elevation: 129 m (423 ft)
- Lowest elevation: 1 m (3.3 ft)
- Population (2023): 150
  - Density: 15/km^{2} (38/sq mi)
- Time zone: UTC+01:00 (CET)
  - Summer (DST): UTC+02:00 (CEST)
- INSEE/Postal code: 76419 /76530
- ^{1} French Land Register data, which excludes lakes, ponds, glaciers > 1 km^{2} (0.386 sq mi or 247 acres) and river estuaries.

Mauny (French pronunciation: [moni]) is a commune in the Seine-Maritime department in the Normandy region in northern France.

== Geography ==
A small farming and forestry village situated in the Roumois, in a meander of the river Seine, some 12 miles (19 km) southwest of Rouen at the junction of the D64, D46 and the D265 roads.

== Heraldry ==
Arms of Mauny	The arms of Mauny are blazoned : Azure, 3 crescents argent 1 &2, and a chief fusilly argent and gules.

== Population ==
Historical population
Year	Pop.	±% p.a.
1968	118	—
1975	94	−3.20%
1982	122	+3.79%
1990	129	+0.70%
1999	132	+0.26%
2007	197	+5.13%
2012	169	−3.02%
2017	172	+0.35%
2023	150	−2.26%
Source: INSEE

== Places of interest ==
- The church of St.Jean & St.Martin, dating from the seventeenth century.
- The chapel of St.Nicholas, dating from the fifteenth century, rebuilt in 1700.
- The eighteenth century château de Mauny.
- The Château du Val-des-Leux.
- The old quarries, used for 300 years for building stone for the churches of Rouen.

== See also ==
- Communes of the Seine-Maritime department
