= Canton of Barentin =

Coordinates: 49.55°N 0.95°E

Barentin
- Canton for the Departmental Council of Seine-Maritime
- Situation of the canton of Barentin in the department
- Department: Seine-Maritime
- Population: 40,361 (2022)
- Electorate: 30,933 (2024)
- Major settlements: Barentin

Current Canton
- Created: 2015
- Members: Christophe Bouillon (PS); Pierrette Canu (PS)
- Seats: Two
- Former cantons: Duclair; Pavilly

The canton of Barentin is an electoral district of the Seine-Maritime department, in northern France. It elects two departmental councillors sitting in the Departmental Council of Seine-Maritime. It was created at the French canton reorganisation which came into effect in March 2015. Its seat is in Barentin.

== Composition ==
It consists of the following communes:

1. Anneville-Ambourville
2. Bardouville
3. Barentin
4. Berville-sur-Seine
5. Blacqueville
6. Bouville
7. Duclair
8. Épinay-sur-Duclair
9. Hénouville
10. Jumièges
11. Mauny
12. Le Mesnil-sous-Jumièges
13. Quevillon
14. Saint-Martin-de-Boscherville
15. Saint-Paër
16. Saint-Pierre-de-Varengeville
17. Sainte-Marguerite-sur-Duclair
18. Le Trait
19. Villers-Écalles
20. Yainville
21. Yville-sur-Seine

== Councillors ==
Election	Member	Party	Elected offices
2015	Christophe Bouillon	PS	Deputy for Seine-Maritime's 5th constituency until 2020; Mayor of Barentin since 2020; Former mayor of Canteleu
2015	Pierrette Canu	PS	Incumbent councillor of the canton of Duclair since 2011; Mayor of Saint-Pierre-de-Manneville until 2020
2021	Christophe Bouillon	PS	Incumbent departmental councillor
2021	Pierrette Canu	PS	Incumbent departmental councillor

== Election results ==
=== 2021 ===
Pairs	Party	Nuance	First round		Second round	
Pairs	Party	Nuance	Votes	%	Votes	%
Christophe Bouillon	PS	SOC	5,809	61.43	7,151	77.18
Pierrette Canu	PS	SOC	5,809	61.43	7,151	77.18
Muriel Poindefer	RN	RN	1,961	20.74	2,114	22.82
Christian Sene	RN	RN	1,961	20.74	2,114	22.82
Paul Bonmartel	LREM	UCD	1,150	12.16		
Dominique Lasnez	LR	UCD	1,150	12.16		
Axel Blanchet	PCF	UG	536	5.67		
Aurélie Nicolle	LFI	UG	536	5.67		
Votes			9,456	100.00	9,265	100.00
Valid votes			9,456	96.89	9,265	95.25
Blank votes			188	1.93	303	3.12
Null votes			116	1.19	159	1.63
Turnout			9,760	31.47	9,727	31.39
Abstentions			21,254	68.53	21,257	68.61
Registered voters			31,014		30,984	
Result			PS HOLD			
Result			PS HOLD			

=== 2015 ===
Pairs	Party	Nuance	First round		Second round	
Pairs	Party	Nuance	Votes	%	Votes	%
Christophe Bouillon	PS	UG	5,910	39.11	9,129	64.21
Pierrette Canu	PS	UG	5,910	39.11	9,129	64.21
Hubert Avenel	FN	FN	4,092	27.08	5,088	35.79
France Collas	FN	FN	4,092	27.08	5,088	35.79
Jean Delalandre	UMP	UD	3,369	22.30		
Catherine Leroy	UMP	UD	3,369	22.30		
Jérôme Andrieu	FG	FG	964	6.38		
Anne-Marie Blondel	FG	FG	964	6.38		
Alain Leconte	PRG	DVG	775	5.13		
Suzanne Sy-Savané	DVG	DVG	775	5.13		
Votes			15,110	100.00	14,217	100.00
Valid votes			15,110	95.98	14,217	90.81
Blank votes			488	3.1	1,066	6.81
Null votes			145	0.92	373	2.38
Turnout			15,743	50.97	15,656	50.69
Abstentions			15,145	49.03	15,232	49.31
Registered voters			30,888		30,888	
Result			PS WIN (new seat)			
Result			PS WIN (new seat)			

== Pictures of the canton ==
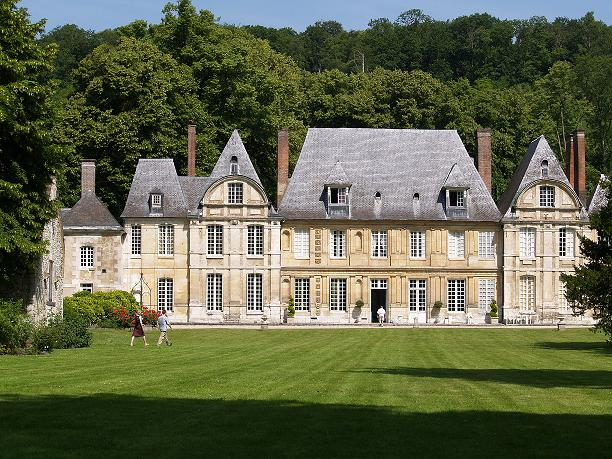
Taillis Castle in Duclair

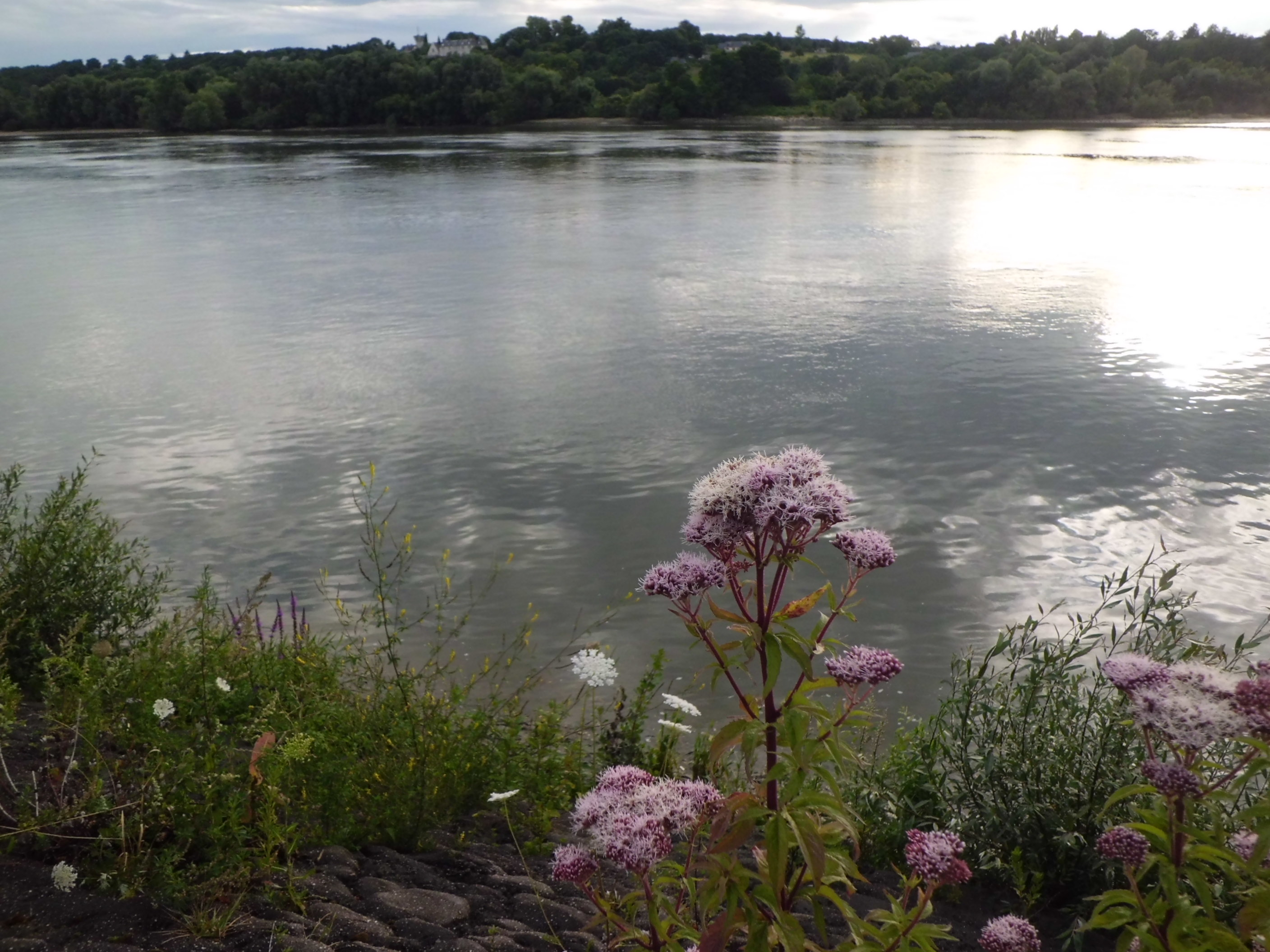
The River Seine in Saint-Martin-de-Boscherville

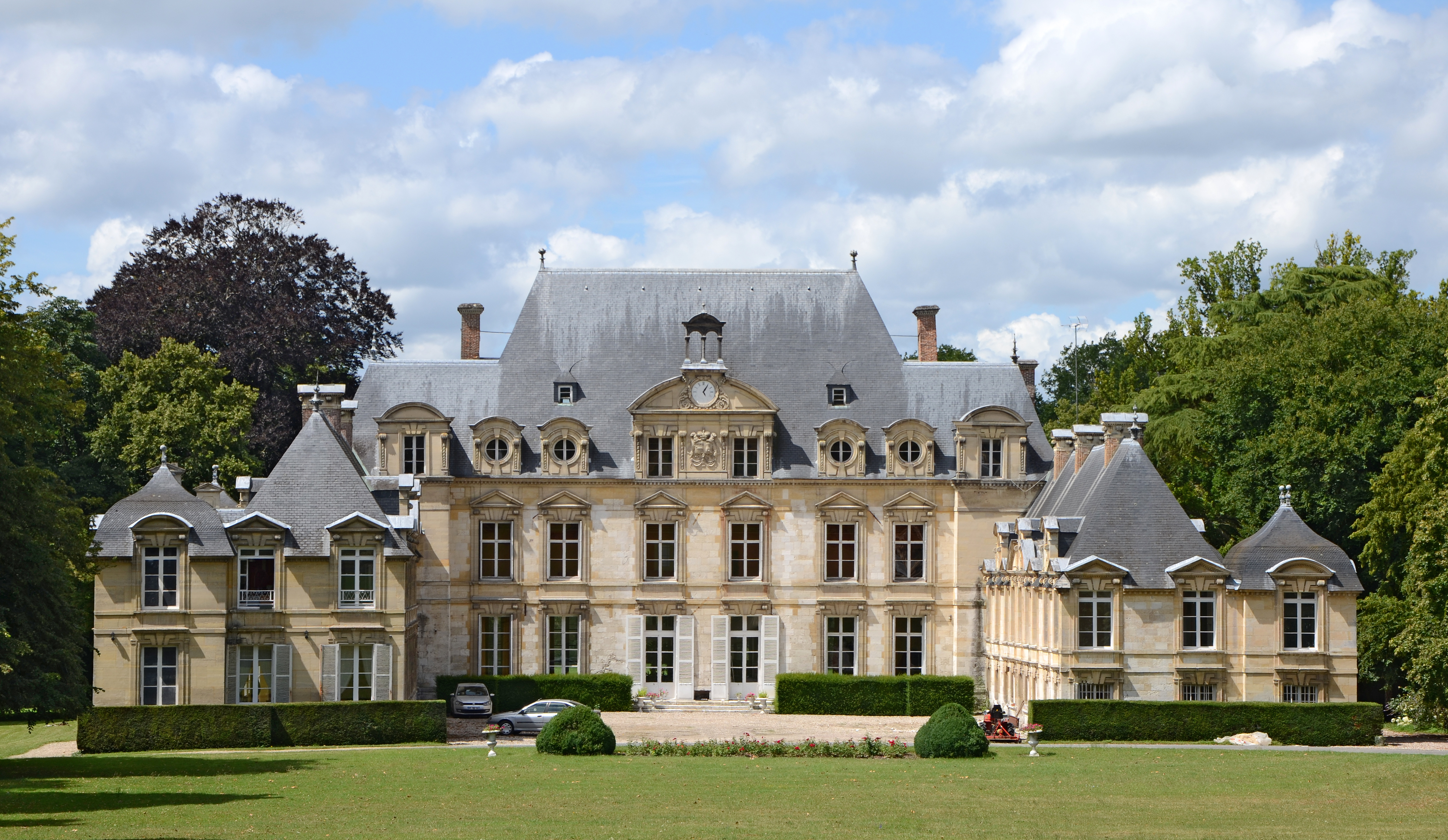
Rivière Bourdet Castle in Quevillon
