= Henri Gadeau de Kerville =

French zoologist, entomologist, botanist and archeologist

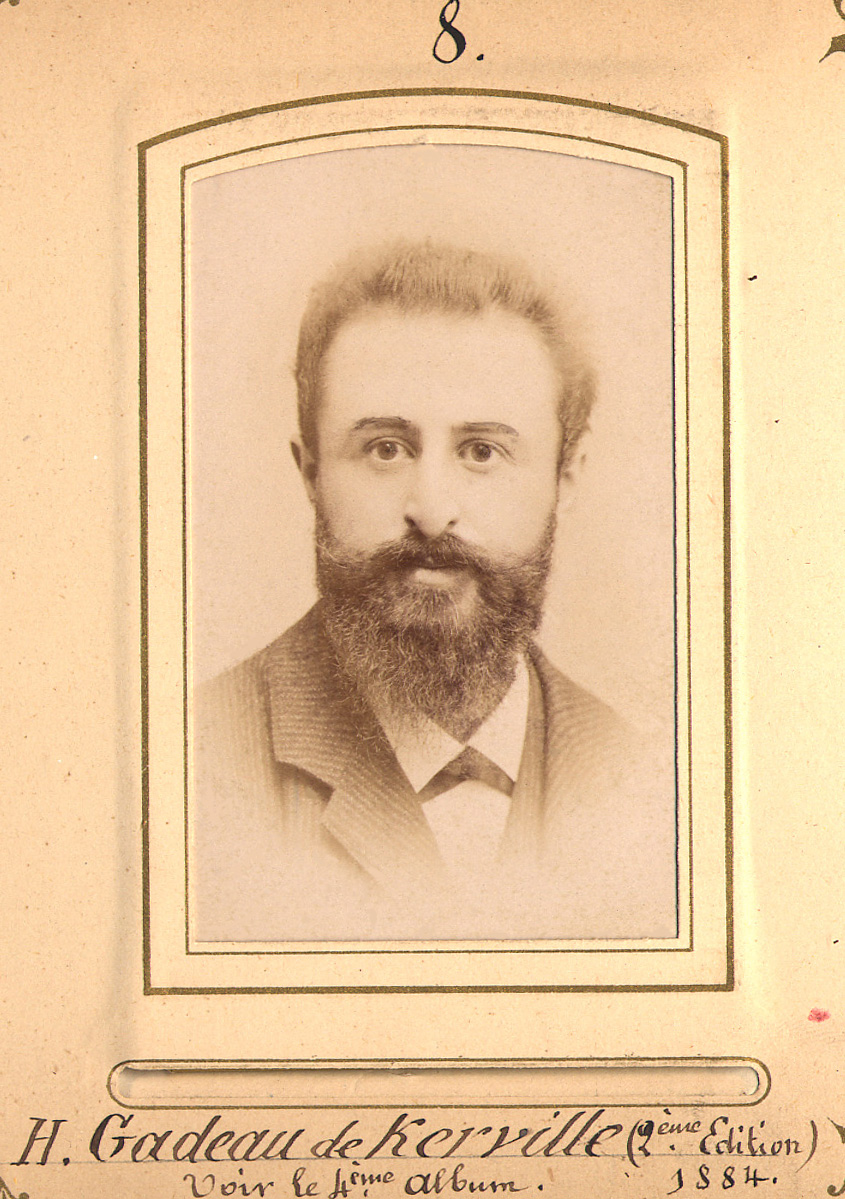
Henri Gadeau de Kerville (1884)

Henri Gadeau de Kerville (17 December 1858 in Rouen – 26 July 1940 in Bagnères-de-Luchon) was a French zoologist, entomologist, botanist and archeologist best known for his photographs of these subjects and especially for his work "Les Insectes phosphorescents: notes complémentaires et bibliographie générale (anatomie physiologie et biologie): avec quatre planches chromolithographiées", Rouen, L. Deshays, 1881.

== Personal life ==
He was educated at the Lycée Pierre Corneille in Rouen. He was a member of the Société des sciences naturelles et amis du Museum de Rouen (1878), the Société botanique de France (1882) and the Société préhistorique française (1911). In 1910 he founded a laboratory for experimental speleobiology in Saint-Paër. The Société zoologique de France and Société entomologique de France each offers a "Prix Gadeau de Kerville" for achievements in their respective fields.

His scientific collections and photographs brought back from his expeditions are kept at museums in Paris, London, Elbeuf and Rouen.

== Selected writings ==
- Les Insectes phosphorescents: notes complémentaires et bibliographie générale (anatomie physiologie et biologie): avec quatre planches chromolithographiées (Phosphorescent insects: general notes and bibliography (anatomy, physiology and biology) with four chromolithographic boards), 1881.
- Mélanges entomologiques, (Entomological melanges), 1883-1936.
- Les Animaux et les Végétaux lumineux, 1890.
- Les Vieux Arbres de la Normandie; étude botanico-historique (Ancient trees of Normandy; botanico-historical study), 1890-.
- L'Évolution du chien dans les sociétés humaines (The evolution of the dog in human society), Société d'éditions scientifiques, Paris, 1900.
- Voyage zoologique d'Henri Gadeau de Kerville en Asie-Mineure, (Zoological voyages of Henri Gadeau de Kerville in Asia Minor), 1900-.
- Resultat des fouilles effectuées dans un abri sous roche, à Bonnières (Seine-et-Oise) et découverte d'une sépulture néolithique dans l'abri de la Roche-Galerne, à Jeufosse (Seine-et-Oise), (Result of excavations in a rock shelter at Bonnières (Seine-et-Oise) and discovery of a Neolithic grave in the shelter of the Roche-Galerne at Jeufosse (Seine-et-Oise), 1911.
- Considérations et recherches expérimentales sur la direction des racines et des tiges, (Considerations and experimental research involving the direction of roots and stems), 1917.
- Notes sur les fougères, (Notes on ferns), 1922.
- Crustacés copépodes récoltés par M. Henri Gadeau de Kerville pendant son voyage zoologique en Syrie (avril-juin 1908), (Copepod crustaceans collected by Henri Gadeau de Kerville during his trip to Syria in April/June 1908), 1926.
- Distractions littéraires d'un biologiste (Literary distractions of a biologist), Librairie Universitaire J. Gamber, Paris, 1933.
