= Le Mesnil-sous-Jumièges =

- Commune
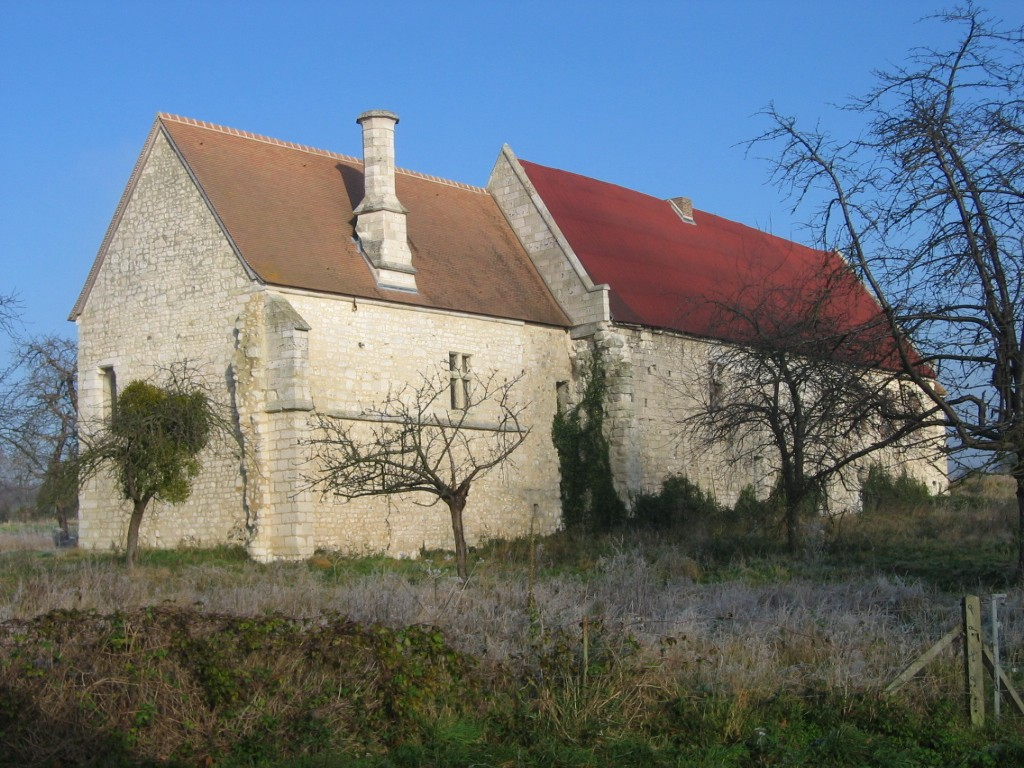
- Manoir de la Vigne
- Location of Le Mesnil-sous-Jumièges
- Location within France Location within Normandy
- Coordinates: 49°24′45″N 0°51′32″E
- Country: France
- Region: Normandy
- Department: Seine-Maritime
- Arrondissement: Rouen
- Canton: Barentin
- Intercommunality: Métropole Rouen-Normandie

Government
  - Mayor (2026–32): Stéphane Vezier
- Area^{1}: 6.84 km^{2} (2.64 sq mi)
- Elevation: 6 m (20 ft)
- Highest elevation: 55 m (180 ft)
- Lowest elevation: 1 m (3.3 ft)
- Population (2023): 602
  - Density: 88.0/km^{2} (228/sq mi)
- Time zone: UTC+01:00 (CET)
  - Summer (DST): UTC+02:00 (CEST)
- INSEE/Postal code: 76436 /76480
- ^{1} French Land Register data, which excludes lakes, ponds, glaciers > 1 km^{2} (0.386 sq mi or 247 acres) and river estuaries.

Le Mesnil-sous-Jumièges is a commune in the Seine-Maritime department in the Normandy region in north-western France.

== Geography ==
A farming village, situated in the Roumois and inside a meander of the river Seine, some 12 miles (19 km) west of Rouen on the D 65 road. A ferry boat carries cars and passengers across the river to Yville-sur-Seine.

== Population ==
Historical population

Year	Pop.	±% p.a.
1793	533	—
1821	490	−0.30%
1846	501	+0.09%
1872	390	−0.96%
1901	321	−0.67%
1926	291	−0.39%
1946	368	+1.18%
1962	449	+1.25%
1968	455	+0.22%

Year	Pop.	±% p.a.
1975	467	+0.37%
1982	556	+2.52%
1990	571	+0.33%
1999	552	−0.38%
2007	619	+1.44%
2012	613	−0.19%
2017	639	+0.83%
2023	602	−0.99%

Source: EHESS and INSEE (1968-2023)

== Places of interest ==
- The church of St.Philibert, dating from the sixteenth century.
- The fourteenth century manor house of Agnès Sorel, mistress of Charles VII.

== See also ==
- Communes of the Seine-Maritime department
