= Saint-Martin-de-Boscherville =

- Commune
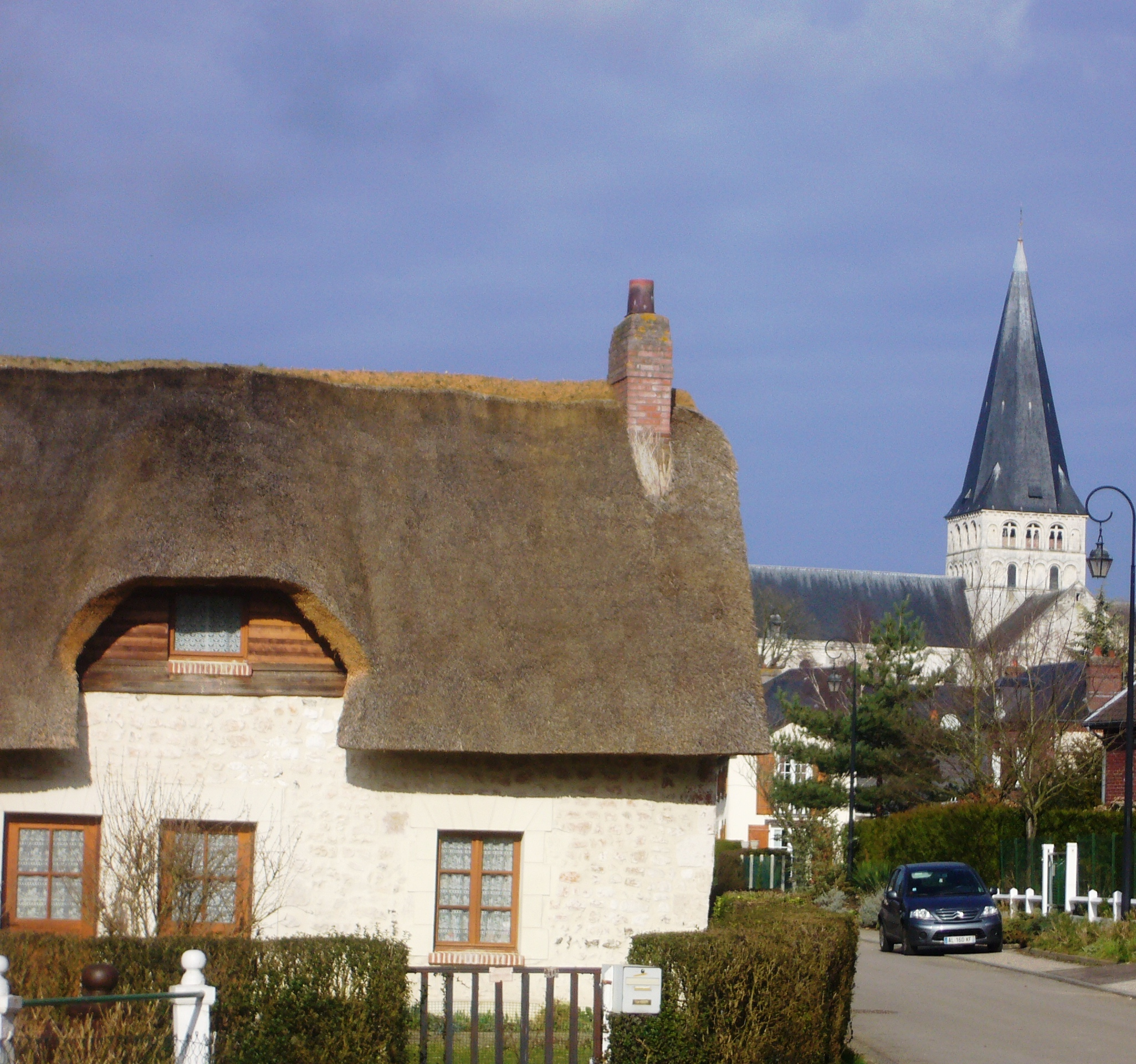
- The village and abbey
- Location of Saint-Martin-de-Boscherville
- Location within France Location within Normandy
- Coordinates: 49°26′39″N 0°57′46″E
- Country: France
- Region: Normandy
- Department: Seine-Maritime
- Arrondissement: Rouen
- Canton: Barentin
- Intercommunality: Métropole Rouen Normandie

Government
  - Mayor (2020–2026): Thierry Chauvin
- Area^{1}: 12.91 km^{2} (4.98 sq mi)
- Elevation: 26 m (85 ft)
- Highest elevation: 134 m (440 ft)
- Lowest elevation: 2 m (6.6 ft)
- Population (2023): 1,515
  - Density: 117.4/km^{2} (303.9/sq mi)
- Time zone: UTC+01:00 (CET)
  - Summer (DST): UTC+02:00 (CEST)
- INSEE/Postal code: 76614 /76840
- ^{1} French Land Register data, which excludes lakes, ponds, glaciers > 1 km^{2} (0.386 sq mi or 247 acres) and river estuaries.

Saint-Martin-de-Boscherville is a commune in the Seine-Maritime department in the Normandy region in northern France.

== Geography ==
A residential village situated by the banks of the river Seine, some 6 miles (9.7 km) west of Rouen at the junction of the D67, D267 and the D982 roads.

== Population ==
Historical population
| Year | Pop. | ±% p.a. |
|---|---|---|
| 1968 | 970 | — |
| 1975 | 1,191 | +2.98% |
| 1982 | 1,389 | +2.22% |
| 1990 | 1,551 | +1.39% |
| 1999 | 1,504 | −0.34% |
| 2007 | 1,446 | −0.49% |
| 2012 | 1,460 | +0.19% |
| 2017 | 1,521 | +0.82% |
| 2023 | 1,515 | −0.07% |
Source: INSEE

== Places of interest ==
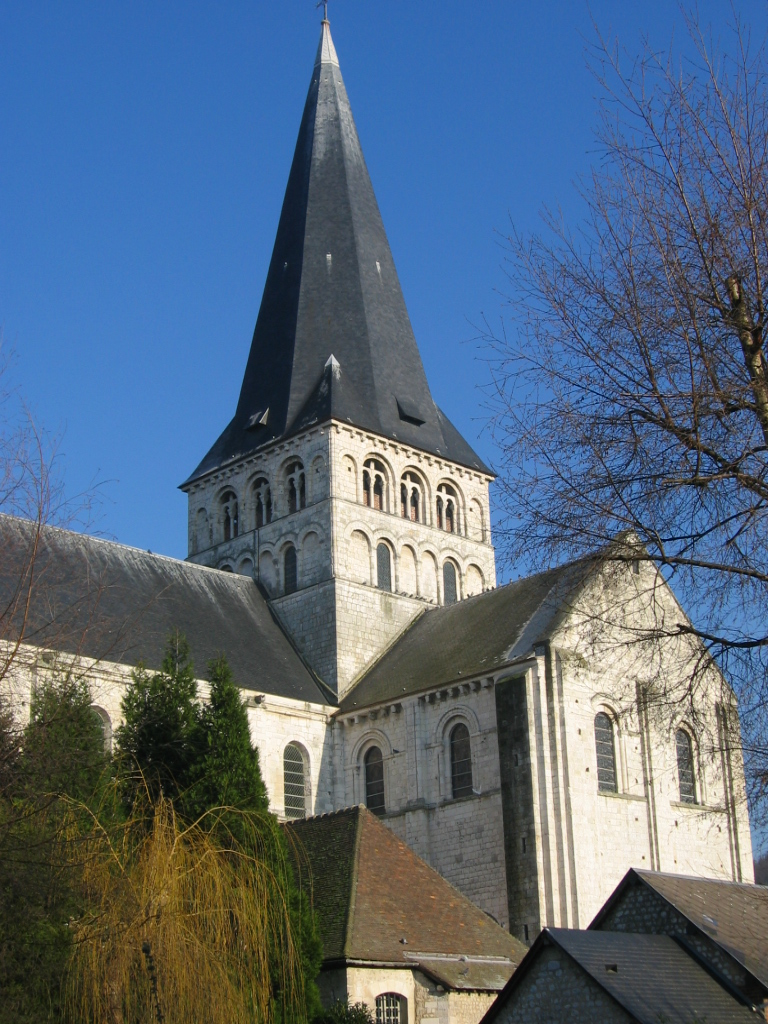
The abbey church

- The abbey church of St. Georges, dating from the twelfth century.
- twelfth century vestiges of the abbey (cloisters and halls etc.)
- Ancient wood-framed houses.
- Manoir de l'Aumônerie, the thirteenth century Templars manorhouse at Genetay.
- Ruins of the old castle of Genetay.
- The sixteenth century chapel of St. Gorgon.

== People ==
- Jean-Pierre Aumer, ballet choreographer, died here in 1833
- Louis Fabulet, translator of the works of Rudyard Kipling lived here.
- The marriage of musician David Hallyday and model Estelle Lefébure took place here in 1989
- Jean Lecanuet, politician, is buried in the abbey

== Twin towns ==
- Hurstpierpoint, England

== See also ==
- Saint-Georges de Boscherville Abbey
- Communes of the Seine-Maritime department

== Bibliography ==
- Gilbert Fromager, Le Canton de Duclair à l'aube du XXe siècle, Duclair, 1986 ISBN 2-9501653-0-3
- Gilbert Fromager, Le Canton de Duclair 1925-1950, Duclair, 1993 ISBN 2-9501653-1-1
- Le Patrimoine des communes de la Seine-Maritime, tome 1, éditions Flohic, 1997 ISBN 2-84234-017-5
