= Le Trait =

- Commune
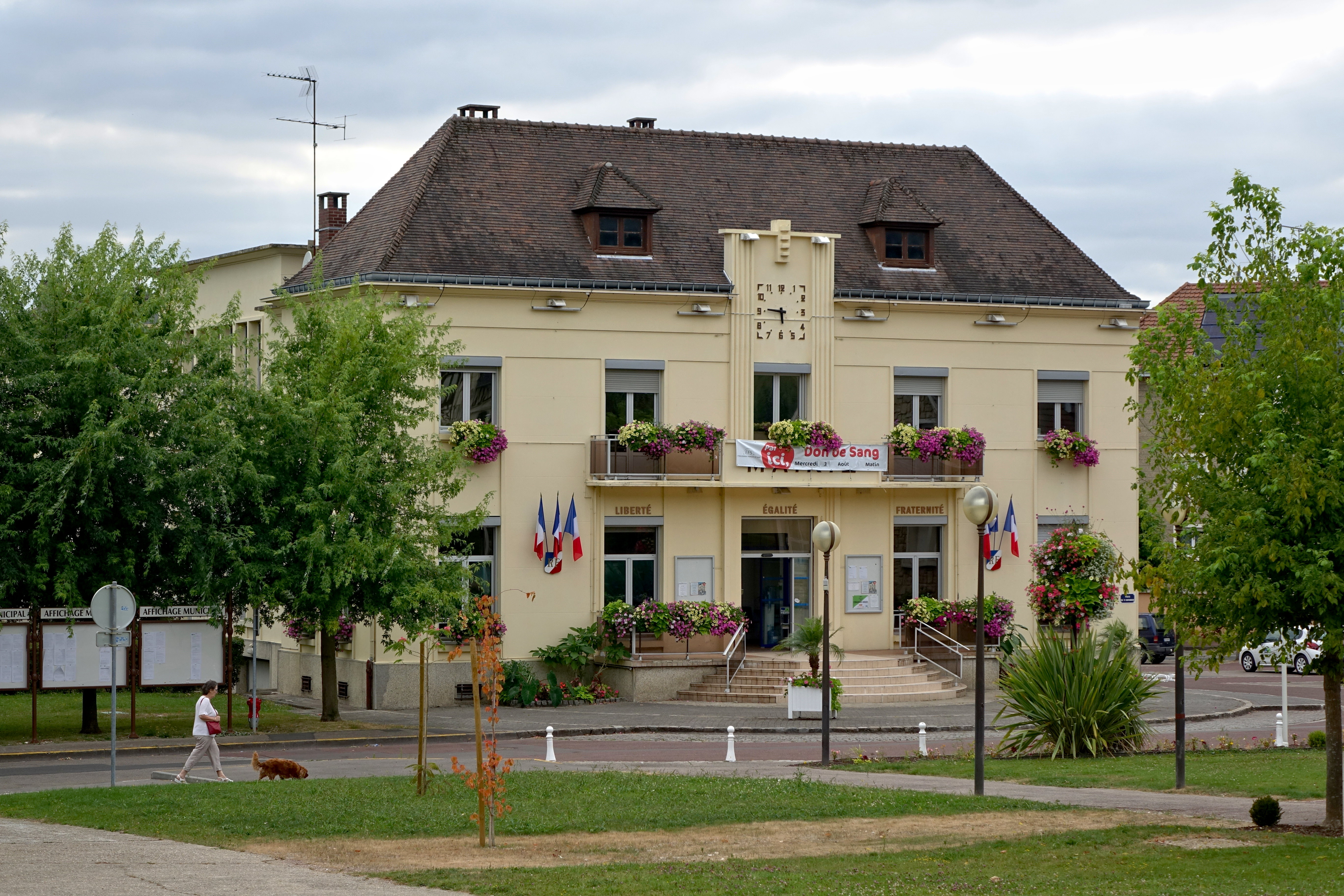
- The town hall in Le Trait

- Coat of arms
- Location of Le Trait
- Location within France Location within Normandy
- Coordinates: 49°29′19″N 0°48′22″E
- Country: France
- Region: Normandy
- Department: Seine-Maritime
- Arrondissement: Rouen
- Canton: Barentin
- Intercommunality: Métropole Rouen Normandie

Government
  - Mayor (2020–2026): Patrick Callais
- Area^{1}: 17.52 km^{2} (6.76 sq mi)
- Elevation: 110 m (360 ft)
- Highest elevation: 117 m (384 ft)
- Lowest elevation: 1 m (3.3 ft)
- Population (2023): 4,704
  - Density: 268.5/km^{2} (695.4/sq mi)
- Time zone: UTC+01:00 (CET)
  - Summer (DST): UTC+02:00 (CEST)
- INSEE/Postal code: 76709 /76580
- ^{1} French Land Register data, which excludes lakes, ponds, glaciers > 1 km^{2} (0.386 sq mi or 247 acres) and river estuaries.

Le Trait (French pronunciation: [lə tʁɛ]) is a commune in the Seine-Maritime department in the Normandy region in north-western France.

== Geography ==
An ex-shipbuilding town, nowadays involved in farming, forestry, light industry and port activity. Technip produces flexible pipes for the offshore oil industry in Le Trait and is the biggest employer. Le Trait is situated by the banks of the river Seine, some 15 miles (24 km) west of Rouen on the D 982 road.

== Heraldry ==
Arms of Le Trait	The arms of the commune of Le Trait are blazoned : Per bend sinister azure and argent, a leopard counterchanged.

== Population ==
Historical population

Year	Pop.	±% p.a.
1793	476	—
1800	458	−0.55%
1806	448	−0.37%
1821	501	+0.75%
1831	464	−0.76%
1836	517	+2.19%
1841	530	+0.50%
1846	532	+0.08%
1851	570	+1.39%
1856	543	−0.97%
1861	536	−0.26%
1866	522	−0.53%
1872	465	−1.91%
1876	504	+2.03%
1881	445	−2.46%
1886	466	+0.93%
1891	498	+1.34%
1896	460	−1.57%
1901	427	−1.48%

Year	Pop.	±% p.a.
1906	392	−1.70%
1911	366	−1.36%
1921	1,570	+15.68%
1926	1,767	+2.39%
1931	2,932	+10.66%
1936	3,200	+1.76%
1946	3,593	+1.17%
1954	4,569	+3.05%
1962	6,407	+4.32%
1968	6,408	+0.00%
1975	6,321	−0.20%
1982	5,917	−0.94%
1990	5,485	−0.94%
1999	5,397	−0.18%
2007	5,186	−0.50%
2012	5,239	+0.20%
2017	4,942	−1.16%
2023	4,704	−0.82%

Source: EHESS and INSEE (1968–2023)

== Places of interest ==
- The church of St. Nicolas, dating from the thirteenth century.
- The ruins of a twelfth-century castle.

== See also ==
- Communes of the Seine-Maritime department

== Bibliography ==
- Maurice Quemin, Le Trait, berceau de 200 navires, que sont-ils devenus ?, 1988 ISBN 2-9502241-0-5.
