= Métropole Rouen Normandie =

Coordinates: 49.44°N 1.09°E

- Métropole
- Situation of the metropolis in Seine-Maritime.
- Country: France
- Region: Normandy
- Department: Seine-Maritime
- No. of communes: {{{nbcomm}}}
- Established: 2015

Government
  - President (2020–2026): Nicolas Mayer-Rossignol (PS)
- Area: 663.8 km^{2} (256.3 sq mi)
- Population (2018): 492,681
  - Density: 742.2/km^{2} (1,922/sq mi)
- Website: www.metropole-rouen-normandie.fr

Métropole Rouen Normandie (French pronunciation: [metʁɔpɔl ʁwɑ̃ nɔʁmɑ̃di]) is the métropole, an intercommunal structure, centred on the city of Rouen. It is located in the Seine-Maritime department, in the Normandy region, north-western France. It was created in January 2015, replacing the previous Communauté d'agglomération Rouen-Elbeuf-Austreberthe. Its area is 663.8 km^{2}. Its population was 492,681 in 2014, of which 111,360 in Rouen proper.

== History ==
The Agglomeration community of Rouen-Elbeuf-Austreberthe (French: Communauté d'agglomération Rouen-Elbeuf-Austreberthe) was created in 2010. On January 1, 2015, the Metropolis replaced the agglomeration community in accordance with a law of January 2014.

== Responsibilities ==
The goal of the Métropole is to build a better metropolitan area by synchronizing the transport system, environmental actions, etc.

== Communes ==
The 71 communes of the Métropole Rouen Normandie are:

1. Amfreville-la-Mi-Voie
2. Anneville-Ambourville
3. Les Authieux-sur-le-Port-Saint-Ouen
4. Bardouville
5. Belbeuf
6. Berville-sur-Seine
7. Bihorel
8. Bois-Guillaume
9. Bonsecours
10. Boos
11. La Bouille
12. Canteleu
13. Caudebec-lès-Elbeuf
14. Cléon
15. Darnétal
16. Déville-lès-Rouen
17. Duclair
18. Elbeuf
19. Épinay-sur-Duclair
20. Fontaine-sous-Préaux
21. Franqueville-Saint-Pierre
22. Freneuse
23. Gouy
24. Grand-Couronne
25. Le Grand-Quevilly
26. Hautot-sur-Seine
27. Hénouville
28. Le Houlme
29. Houppeville
30. Isneauville
31. Jumièges
32. La Londe
33. Malaunay
34. Maromme
35. Le Mesnil-Esnard
36. Le Mesnil-sous-Jumièges
37. Montmain
38. Mont-Saint-Aignan
39. Moulineaux
40. La Neuville-Chant-d'Oisel
41. Notre-Dame-de-Bondeville
42. Oissel
43. Orival
44. Petit-Couronne
45. Le Petit-Quevilly
46. Quevillon
47. Quévreville-la-Poterie
48. Roncherolles-sur-le-Vivier
49. Rouen
50. Sahurs
51. Saint-Aubin-Celloville
52. Saint-Aubin-Épinay
53. Saint-Aubin-lès-Elbeuf
54. Sainte-Marguerite-sur-Duclair
55. Saint-Étienne-du-Rouvray
56. Saint-Jacques-sur-Darnétal
57. Saint-Léger-du-Bourg-Denis
58. Saint-Martin-de-Boscherville
59. Saint-Martin-du-Vivier
60. Saint-Paër
61. Saint-Pierre-de-Manneville
62. Saint-Pierre-de-Varengeville
63. Saint-Pierre-lès-Elbeuf
64. Sotteville-lès-Rouen
65. Sotteville-sous-le-Val
66. Tourville-la-Rivière
67. Le Trait
68. Val-de-la-Haye
69. Yainville
70. Ymare
71. Yville-sur-Seine

== See also ==
- Communauté de communes Seine-Austreberthe (1998-2010)
- Transport in Rouen
