= Yainville =

- Commune
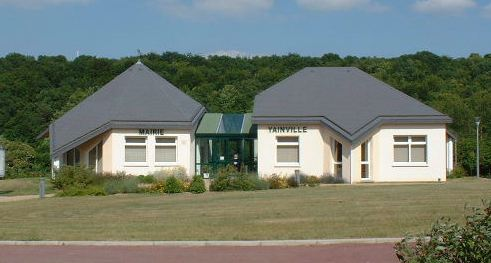
- Town hall
- Location of Yainville
- Location within France Location within Normandy
- Coordinates: 49°27′12″N 0°49′51″E
- Country: France
- Region: Normandy
- Department: Seine-Maritime
- Arrondissement: Rouen
- Canton: Barentin
- Intercommunality: Rouen Normandie

Government
  - Mayor (2020–2026): Anne-Marie Del Sole
- Area^{1}: 3.31 km^{2} (1.28 sq mi)
- Elevation: 12 m (39 ft)
- Highest elevation: 68 m (223 ft)
- Lowest elevation: 2 m (6.6 ft)
- Population (2023): 1,031
  - Density: 311/km^{2} (807/sq mi)
- Time zone: UTC+01:00 (CET)
  - Summer (DST): UTC+02:00 (CEST)
- INSEE/Postal code: 76750 /76480
- ^{1} French Land Register data, which excludes lakes, ponds, glaciers > 1 km^{2} (0.386 sq mi or 247 acres) and river estuaries.

Yainville (French pronunciation: [jɛ̃vil]) is a commune in the Seine-Maritime department in the Normandy region in north-western France.

== Geography ==
A village of farming and light industry situated inside a meander of the river Seine, some 15 miles (24 km) west of Rouen at the junction of the D 982 with the D 143 road. A car ferry service connects the commune with Heurteauville.

== Population ==
Historical population
Year	Pop.	±% p.a.
1968	993	—
1975	1,117	+1.70%
1982	1,246	+1.57%
1990	1,135	−1.16%
1999	1,181	+0.44%
2007	1,105	−0.83%
2012	1,094	−0.20%
2017	1,050	−0.82%
2023	1,031	−0.30%
Source: INSEE

== Places of interest ==
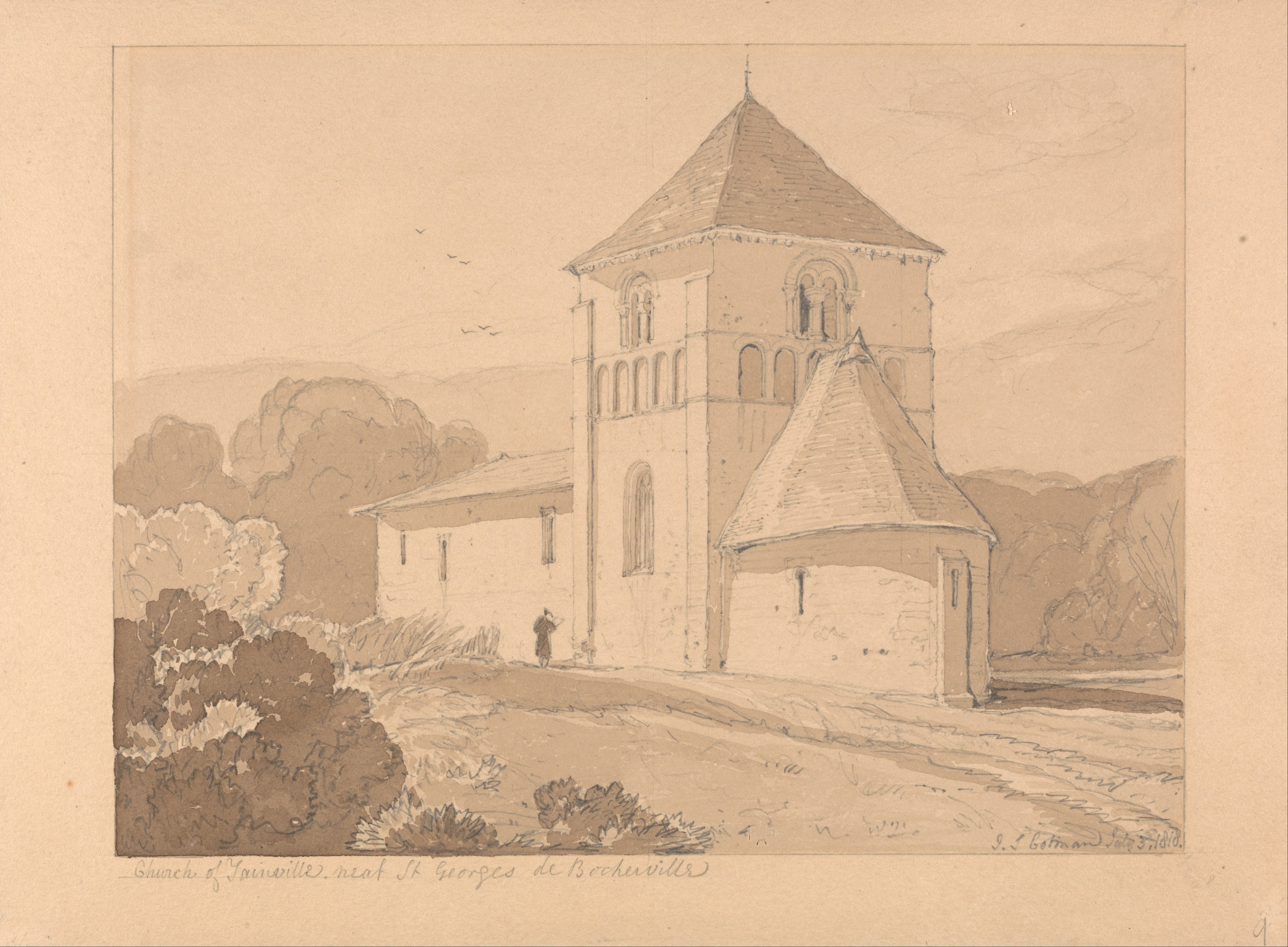
Yainville church by John Sell Cotman

- The church of St. Andre, dating from the eleventh century.

== See also ==
- Communes of the Seine-Maritime department
