= Bardouville =

- Commune
- Location of Bardouville
- Location within France Location within Normandy
- Coordinates: 49°26′13″N 0°55′39″E
- Country: France
- Region: Normandy
- Department: Seine-Maritime
- Arrondissement: Rouen
- Canton: Barentin
- Intercommunality: Métropole Rouen Normandie

Government
  - Mayor (2020–2026): Dominique Rousseau
- Area^{1}: 8.61 km^{2} (3.32 sq mi)
- Elevation: 58 m (190 ft)
- Highest elevation: 68 m (223 ft)
- Lowest elevation: 1 m (3.3 ft)
- Population (2023): 597
  - Density: 69.3/km^{2} (180/sq mi)
- Time zone: UTC+01:00 (CET)
  - Summer (DST): UTC+02:00 (CEST)
- INSEE/Postal code: 76056 /76480
- ^{1} French Land Register data, which excludes lakes, ponds, glaciers > 1 km^{2} (0.386 sq mi or 247 acres) and river estuaries.

Bardouville (French pronunciation: [baʁduvil]) is a commune in the Seine-Maritime department in the Normandie region in north-western France.

== Geography ==
A forestry and farming village situated in the Roumois, inside a meander of the river Seine, some 6 miles (9.7 km) west of Rouen on the D 64 road.

== Population ==
Historical population
Year	Pop.	±% p.a.
1968	297	—
1975	489	+7.38%
1982	497	+0.23%
1990	576	+1.86%
1999	576	+0.00%
2007	625	+1.03%
2012	677	+1.61%
2017	639	−1.15%
2023	597	−1.13%
Source: INSEE

== Places of interest ==
- The Château du Corset-Rouge, dating from the nineteenth century.
- The church of St.Michel, dating from the eleventh century.

== Twin Cities ==
- Les Planchettes, Switzerland.

== See also ==
- Communes of the Seine-Maritime department
