= Sainte-Marguerite-sur-Duclair =

- Commune
- Coat of arms
- Location of Sainte-Marguerite-sur-Duclair
- Location within France Location within Normandy
- Coordinates: 49°30′36″N 0°50′38″E
- Country: France
- Region: Normandy
- Department: Seine-Maritime
- Arrondissement: Rouen
- Canton: Barentin
- Intercommunality: Métropole Rouen Normandie

Government
  - Mayor (2026–32): Astrid Lamotte
- Area^{1}: 7.26 km^{2} (2.80 sq mi)
- Elevation: 66 m (217 ft)
- Highest elevation: 121 m (397 ft)
- Lowest elevation: 35 m (115 ft)
- Population (2023): 2,020
  - Density: 278/km^{2} (721/sq mi)
- Time zone: UTC+01:00 (CET)
  - Summer (DST): UTC+02:00 (CEST)
- INSEE/Postal code: 76608 /76480
- ^{1} French Land Register data, which excludes lakes, ponds, glaciers > 1 km^{2} (0.386 sq mi or 247 acres) and river estuaries.

Sainte-Marguerite-sur-Duclair (French pronunciation: [sɛ̃t maʁɡəʁit syʁ dyklɛʁ], lit. 'Sainte-Marguerite on Duclair') is a commune in the Seine-Maritime department in the Normandy region in northern France.

== Geography ==
A farming village situated in the Pays de Caux, some 11 miles (18 km) northwest of Rouen at the junction of the D20, D86 and the D64 roads.

== Heraldry ==
Arms of Sainte-Marguerite-sur-Duclair	The arms of Sainte-Marguerite-sur-Duclair are blazoned : Or, on a chevron azure between 3 spur rowels sable, 5 annulets of the field.

== Population ==
Historical population
Year	Pop.	±% p.a.
1968	720	—
1975	883	+2.96%
1982	1,106	+3.27%
1990	1,425	+3.22%
1999	1,519	+0.71%
2007	1,641	+0.97%
2012	1,953	+3.54%
2017	2,028	+0.76%
2023	2,020	−0.07%
Source: INSEE

== Places of interest ==
- The church of St.Marguerite, dating from the sixteenth century.
- The manorhouse, dating from the sixteenth century.

== People ==
- Karin Viard, a French actress born in 1966, spent much of her childhood here.

== See also ==
- Communes of the Seine-Maritime department
