= Saint-Pierre-de-Varengeville =

- Commune
- Location of Saint-Pierre-de-Varengeville
- Location within France Location within Normandy
- Coordinates: 49°30′08″N 0°56′01″E
- Country: France
- Region: Normandy
- Department: Seine-Maritime
- Arrondissement: Rouen
- Canton: Barentin
- Intercommunality: Métropole Rouen Normandie

Government
  - Mayor (2020–2026): Jean-Michel Mauger
- Area^{1}: 13.18 km^{2} (5.09 sq mi)
- Elevation: 128 m (420 ft)
- Highest elevation: 132 m (433 ft)
- Lowest elevation: 1 m (3.3 ft)
- Population (2023): 2,322
  - Density: 176.2/km^{2} (456.3/sq mi)
- Time zone: UTC+01:00 (CET)
  - Summer (DST): UTC+02:00 (CEST)
- INSEE/Postal code: 76636 /76480
- ^{1} French Land Register data, which excludes lakes, ponds, glaciers > 1 km^{2} (0.386 sq mi or 247 acres) and river estuaries.

Saint-Pierre-de-Varengeville (French pronunciation: [sɛ̃ pjɛʁ də vaʁɑ̃ʒvil]) is a commune in the Seine-Maritime department in the Normandy region in northern France.

== Geography ==
A small town of forestry, farming and a little light industry situated by the banks of the Seine, some 7 miles (11 km) northwest of Rouen at the junction of the D90, D43 and the D86 roads.

== Population ==
Historical population
Year	Pop.	±% p.a.
1968	1,450	—
1975	1,613	+1.53%
1982	1,853	+2.00%
1990	2,143	+1.83%
1999	2,277	+0.68%
2007	2,251	−0.14%
2012	2,195	−0.50%
2017	2,338	+1.27%
2023	2,322	−0.11%
Source: INSEE

== Places of interest ==
- The church of St. Martin, dating from the nineteenth century.
- The chapel of St. Gilles, dating from the seventeenth century.
- The nineteenth-century chateau Le Breton.
- The seventeenth-century stone cross.
- The chapel of St. Anne.
- Traces of an ancient castle.

== See also ==
- Communes of the Seine-Maritime department
