= Jumièges =

- Commune
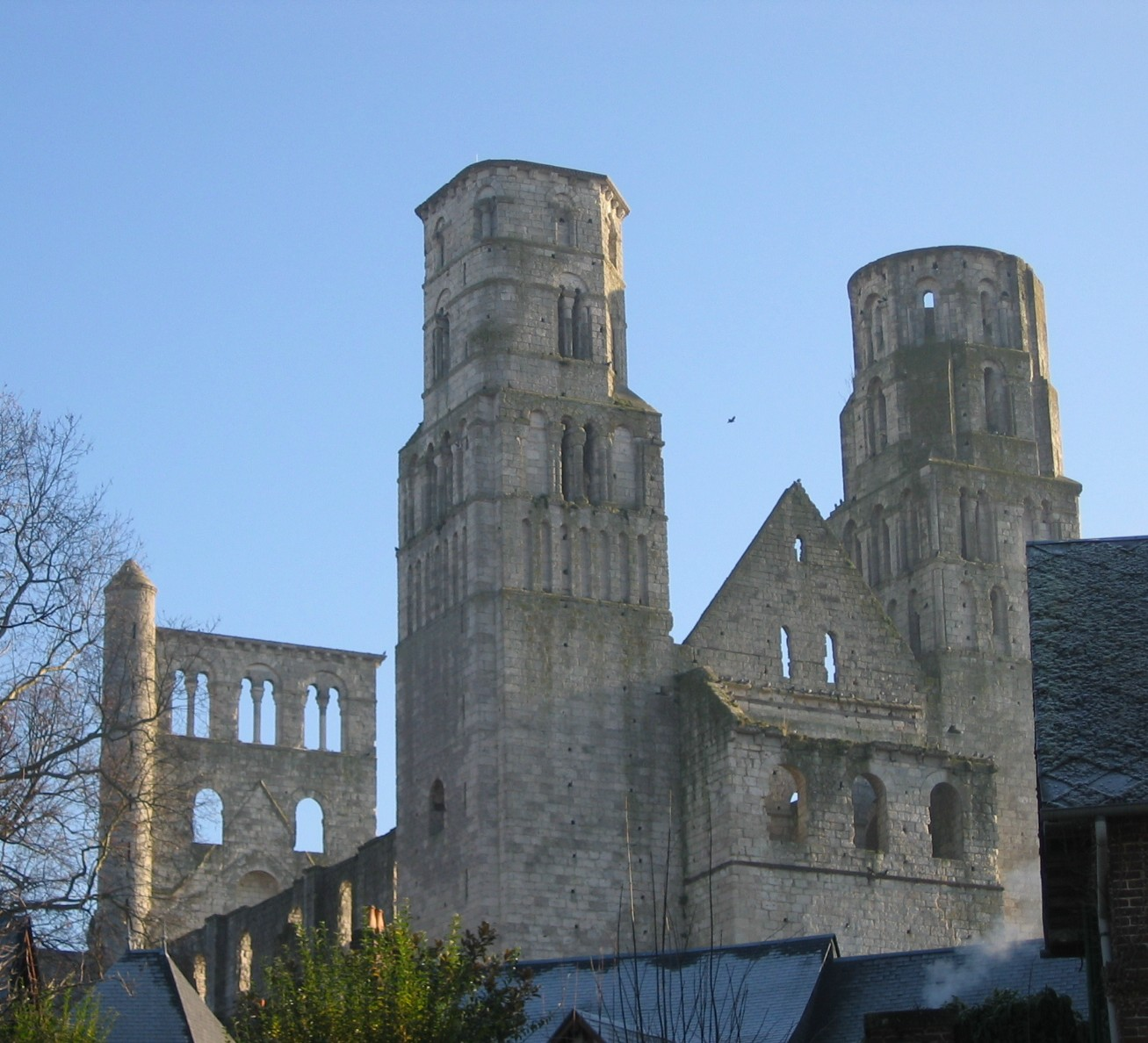
- Ruins of the abbey of Jumièges

- Coat of arms
- Location of Jumièges
- Location within France Location within Normandy
- Coordinates: 49°26′04″N 0°49′17″E
- Country: France
- Region: Normandy
- Department: Seine-Maritime
- Arrondissement: Rouen
- Canton: Barentin
- Intercommunality: Métropole Rouen-Normandie

Government
  - Mayor (2026–32): Julien Delalandre
- Area^{1}: 18.75 km^{2} (7.24 sq mi)
- Elevation: 8 m (26 ft)
- Highest elevation: 83 m (272 ft)
- Lowest elevation: 0 m (0 ft)
- Population (2023): 1,761
  - Density: 93.92/km^{2} (243.3/sq mi)
- Time zone: UTC+01:00 (CET)
  - Summer (DST): UTC+02:00 (CEST)
- INSEE/Postal code: 76378 /76480
- ^{1} French Land Register data, which excludes lakes, ponds, glaciers > 1 km^{2} (0.386 sq mi or 247 acres) and river estuaries.

Jumièges (French pronunciation: [ʒymjɛʒ]) is a commune in the Seine-Maritime department in the Normandy region in north-western France. In 1868, the commune of Heurteauville was created from part of the Jumièges.

== Geography ==
A forestry and farming village situated in a meander of the River Seine, the commune is some 21 kilometres (13 mi) west of Rouen, at the junction of the D 65 and the D 143 roads. A ferry service operates here and connects it with the south and the west sides of the river.

== Heraldry ==
Arms of Jumièges	The arms of Jumièges are blazoned : Azure, a cross Or between 4 keys addorsed argent.

== Demography ==
Historical population

Year	Pop.	±% p.a.
1793	1,694	—
1800	1,850	+1.27%
1806	1,862	+0.11%
1821	1,955	+0.33%
1831	1,847	−0.57%
1836	1,711	−1.52%
1841	1,678	−0.39%
1846	1,674	−0.05%
1851	1,765	+1.06%
1856	1,670	−1.10%
1861	1,602	−0.83%
1866	1,618	+0.20%
1872	1,073	−6.62%
1876	1,084	+0.26%
1881	1,015	−1.31%
1886	1,028	+0.25%
1891	1,027	−0.02%
1896	1,020	−0.14%
1901	995	−0.50%

Year	Pop.	±% p.a.
1906	1,012	+0.34%
1911	928	−1.72%
1921	872	−0.62%
1926	847	−0.58%
1931	867	+0.47%
1936	880	+0.30%
1946	1,078	+2.05%
1954	1,088	+0.12%
1962	1,214	+1.38%
1968	1,305	+1.21%
1975	1,474	+1.75%
1982	1,634	+1.48%
1990	1,641	+0.05%
1999	1,714	+0.48%
2007	1,715	+0.01%
2012	1,769	+0.62%
2017	1,719	−0.57%
2023	1,761	+0.40%

Source: EHESS and INSEE (1968-2023)

== Places of interest ==
- The church of St. Valentin, dating from the eleventh century.
- The ruins of the tenth-century church of St.Pierre (part of the abbey)
- An eighteenth-century chapel.
- Several lesser buildings dating from the eleventh century.

=== Jumièges Abbey ===
It is best known as the site of Jumièges Abbey, a typical Norman abbey of the Romanesque period, and the home of the pro-Norman chronicler William of Jumièges who wrote the Gesta Normannorum Ducum about 1070. Ruined in the first quarter of the 19th century, the abbey dates from the 7th century. The church of Notre Dame was consecrated in 1067 in the presence of William the Conqueror.

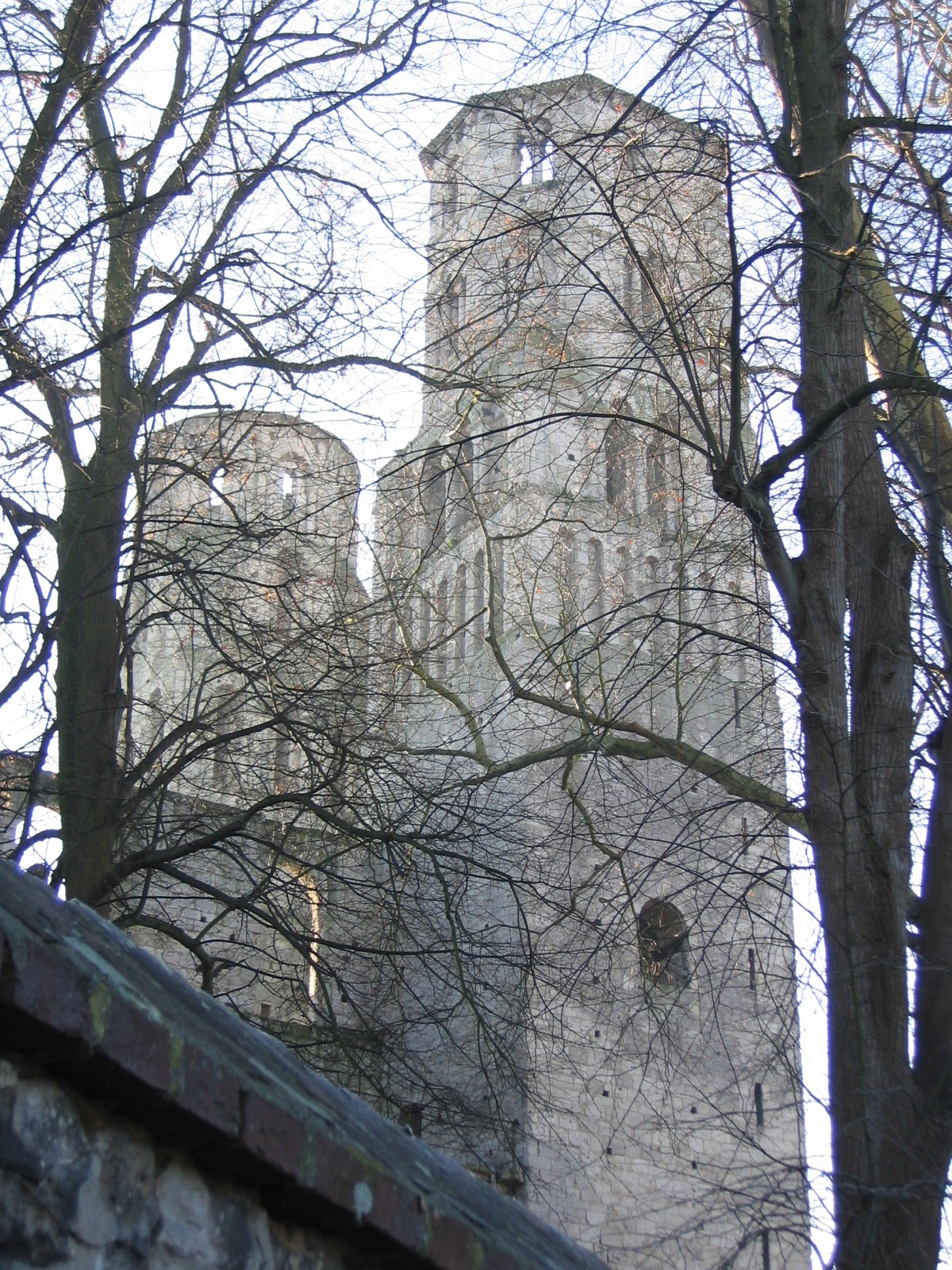
The towers of Jumièges abbey

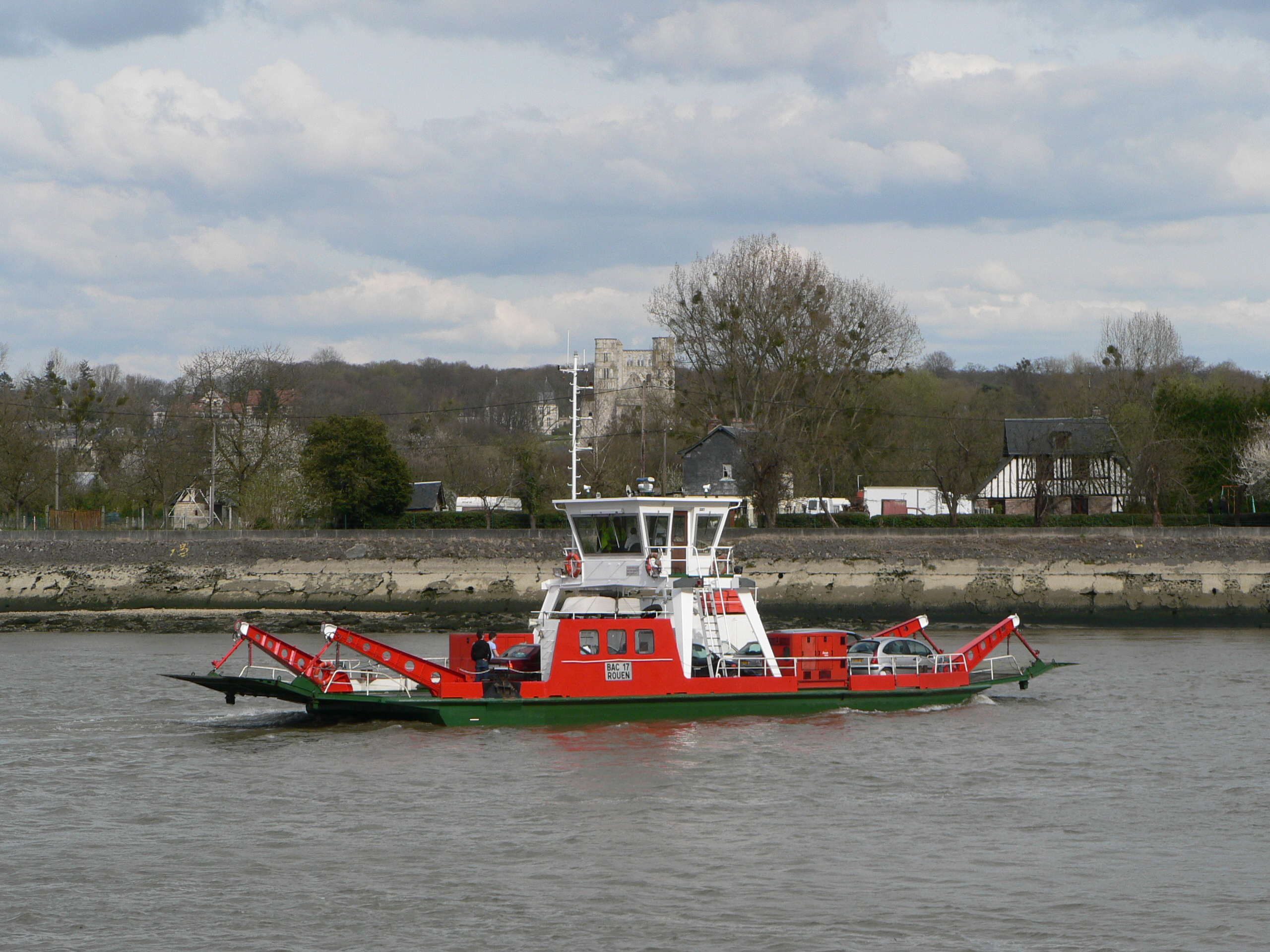
The river ferry

== People linked with the commune ==
- Maurice Leblanc, writer.
- Roger Martin du Gard, writer.

== See also ==
- Communes of the Seine-Maritime department
