= Saint-Paër =

- Commune
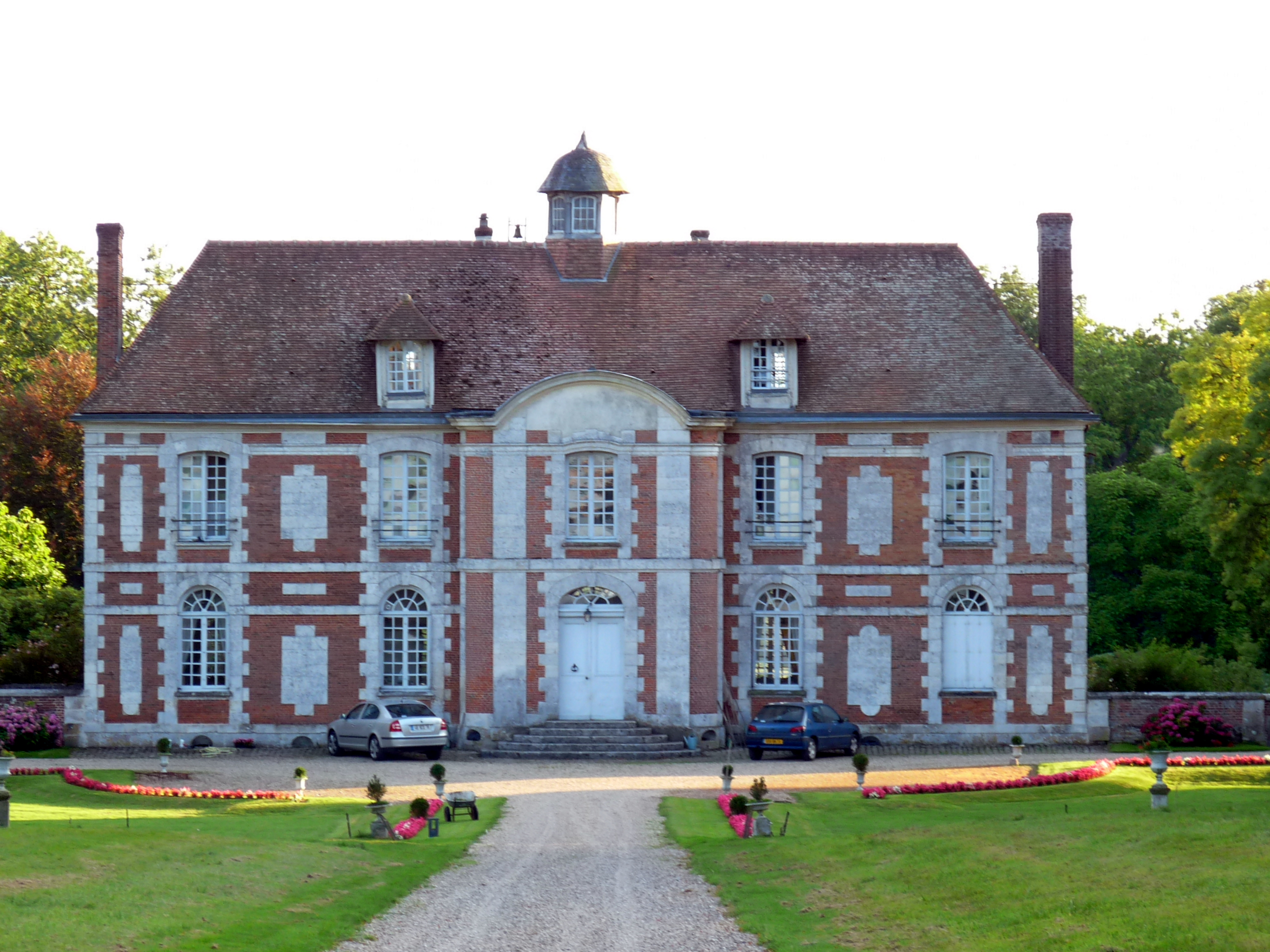
- The chateau of Aulnay in Saint-Paër
- Location of Saint-Paër
- Location within France Location within Normandy
- Coordinates: 49°31′02″N 0°52′48″E
- Country: France
- Region: Normandy
- Department: Seine-Maritime
- Arrondissement: Rouen
- Canton: Barentin
- Intercommunality: Métropole Rouen Normandie

Government
  - Mayor (2026–32): Valère His
- Area^{1}: 18.36 km^{2} (7.09 sq mi)
- Elevation: 107 m (351 ft)
- Highest elevation: 126 m (413 ft)
- Lowest elevation: 7 m (23 ft)
- Population (2023): 1,308
  - Density: 71.24/km^{2} (184.5/sq mi)
- Time zone: UTC+01:00 (CET)
  - Summer (DST): UTC+02:00 (CEST)
- INSEE/Postal code: 76631 /76480
- ^{1} French Land Register data, which excludes lakes, ponds, glaciers > 1 km^{2} (0.386 sq mi or 247 acres) and river estuaries.

Saint-Paër is a commune in the Seine-Maritime department in the Normandy region in northern France.

== Geography ==
A farming village situated by the banks of the river Austreberthe in the Pays de Caux, some 12 miles (19 km) northwest of Rouen at the junction of the D5, D63 and the D86 roads.

== Population ==
Historical population
Year	Pop.	±% p.a.
1968	873	—
1975	932	+0.94%
1982	1,218	+3.90%
1990	1,265	+0.47%
1999	1,326	+0.52%
2007	1,200	−1.24%
2012	1,273	+1.19%
2017	1,346	+1.12%
2023	1,308	−0.48%
Source: INSEE

== Places of interest ==
- The church of St. Paër, dating from the eleventh century.
- The chapel of the Trinity at Mesnil-Varin, dating from the seventeenth century.
- The seventeenth-century chateau of Aulnay.
- The chateau des Vieux, also named château of Bois-Guéroult, built in the XVIIth, where lived the lords des Vieux or Bois-Guéroult.
- The chapel of the château of Bois-Guéroult.

== People ==
- Henri Gadeau de Kerville, zoologist, set up his laboratory here in 1910.

== See also ==
- Communes of the Seine-Maritime department
