= Yville-sur-Seine =

- Commune
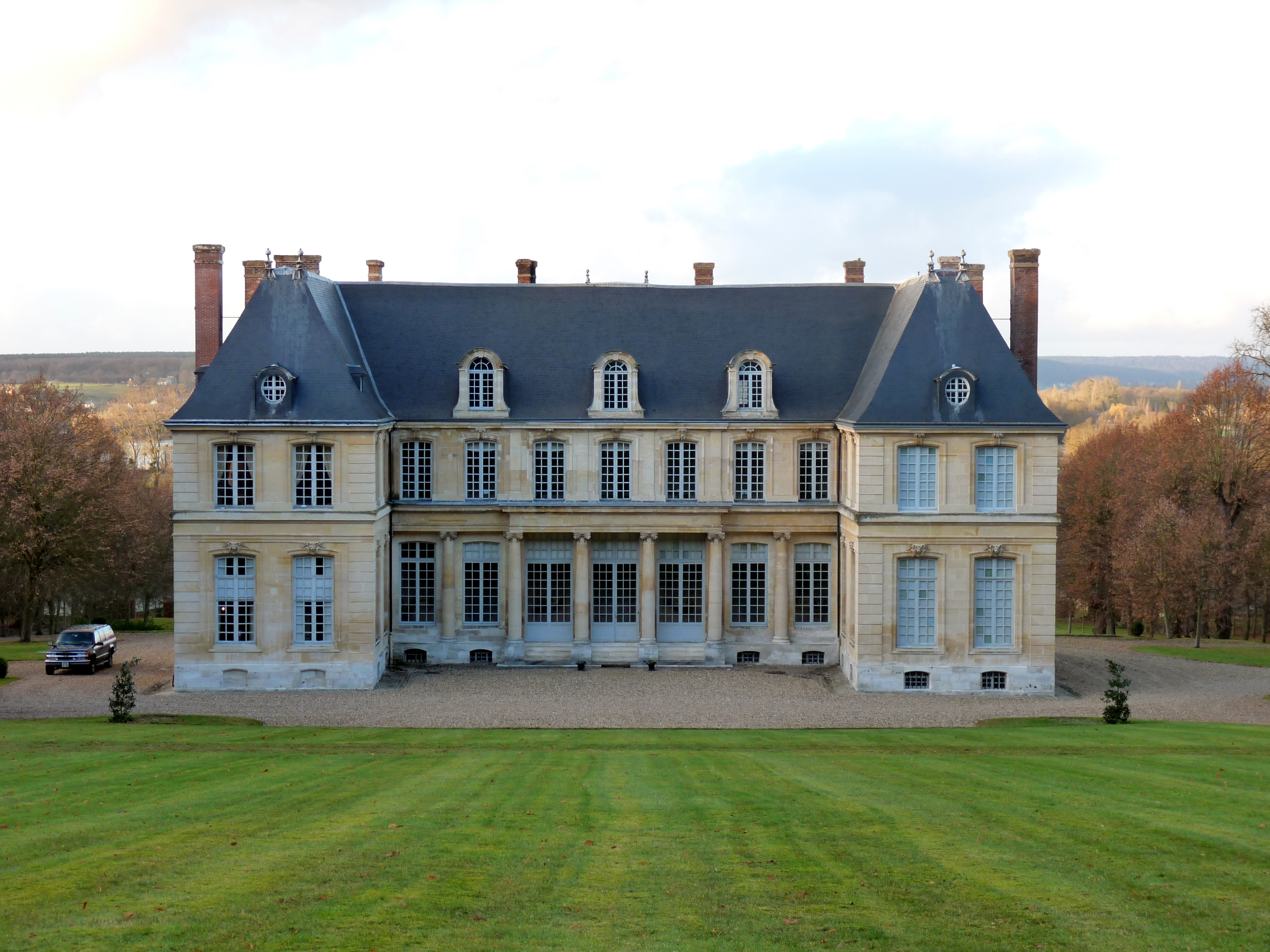
- The chateau in Yville-sur-Seine
- Location of Yville-sur-Seine
- Location within France Location within Normandy
- Coordinates: 49°24′03″N 0°52′47″E
- Country: France
- Region: Normandy
- Department: Seine-Maritime
- Arrondissement: Rouen
- Canton: Barentin
- Intercommunality: Métropole Rouen Normandie

Government
  - Mayor (2026–32): Marc Larcheveque
- Area^{1}: 8.25 km^{2} (3.19 sq mi)
- Elevation: 15 m (49 ft)
- Highest elevation: 60 m (200 ft)
- Lowest elevation: 1 m (3.3 ft)
- Population (2023): 418
  - Density: 50.7/km^{2} (131/sq mi)
- Demonym(s): Yvillais, Yvillaises
- Time zone: UTC+01:00 (CET)
  - Summer (DST): UTC+02:00 (CEST)
- INSEE/Postal code: 76759 /76530
- ^{1} French Land Register data, which excludes lakes, ponds, glaciers > 1 km^{2} (0.386 sq mi or 247 acres) and river estuaries.

Yville-sur-Seine (French pronunciation: [ivil syʁ sɛn], literally Yville on Seine) is a commune in the Seine-Maritime department in the Normandy region in north-western France.

== Geography ==
A farming village situated on the left (south) bank of the river Seine, in the Roumois some 10 miles (16 km) southwest of Rouen at the junction of the D 45 with the D 265 road.

== Population ==
Historical population
Year	Pop.	±% p.a.
1968	280	—
1975	240	−2.18%
1982	388	+7.10%
1990	414	+0.81%
1999	433	+0.50%
2007	434	+0.03%
2012	482	+2.12%
2017	451	−1.32%
2023	418	−1.26%
Source: INSEE

== Places of interest ==
- A fifteenth-century timber constructed manoir.
- A stone cross from the thirteenth century.
- The church of St. Léger, dating from the twelfth century.
- The eighteenth-century château of Yville, a privately owned historical monument. The magnificent gardens and grounds include a collection of holly (ilex sp.), box (buxus), lilac (syringa) and roses. It was built by Jean-Jacques Martinet, from plans attributed to Jules Hardouin Mansart.

== See also ==
- Communes of the Seine-Maritime department
