= Berville-sur-Seine =

- Commune
- Location of Berville-sur-Seine
- Location within France Location within Normandy
- Coordinates: 49°28′23″N 0°54′09″E
- Country: France
- Region: Normandy
- Department: Seine-Maritime
- Arrondissement: Rouen
- Canton: Barentin
- Intercommunality: Métropole Rouen Normandie

Government
  - Mayor (2020–2026): Pascal Ponty
- Area^{1}: 7.01 km^{2} (2.71 sq mi)
- Elevation: 5 m (16 ft)
- Highest elevation: 24 m (79 ft)
- Lowest elevation: 1 m (3.3 ft)
- Population (2023): 528
  - Density: 75.3/km^{2} (195/sq mi)
- Time zone: UTC+01:00 (CET)
  - Summer (DST): UTC+02:00 (CEST)
- INSEE/Postal code: 76088 /76480
- ^{1} French Land Register data, which excludes lakes, ponds, glaciers > 1 km^{2} (0.386 sq mi or 247 acres) and river estuaries.

Berville-sur-Seine (French pronunciation: [bɛʁvil syʁ sɛn], literally Berville on Seine) is a commune in the Seine-Maritime department in the Normandy region in northern France.

== Geography ==
A farming village situated in a large meander of the river Seine, some 11 miles (18 km) northwest of Rouen, at the junction of the D64 and the D45 roads. A ferry connects the commune with the neighbouring town of Duclair.

== Population ==
Historical population
Year	Pop.	±% p.a.
1968	277	—
1975	305	+1.39%
1982	486	+6.88%
1990	478	−0.21%
1999	552	+1.61%
2007	550	−0.05%
2012	555	+0.18%
2017	559	+0.14%
2023	528	−0.95%
Source: INSEE

== Places of interest ==
- The church of St.Lubin, dating from the sixteenth century.
- A sixteenth-century stone cross.
- A timber-framed manorhouse with an exterior staircase.

== See also ==
- Communes of the Seine-Maritime department
