= Hénouville =

- Commune
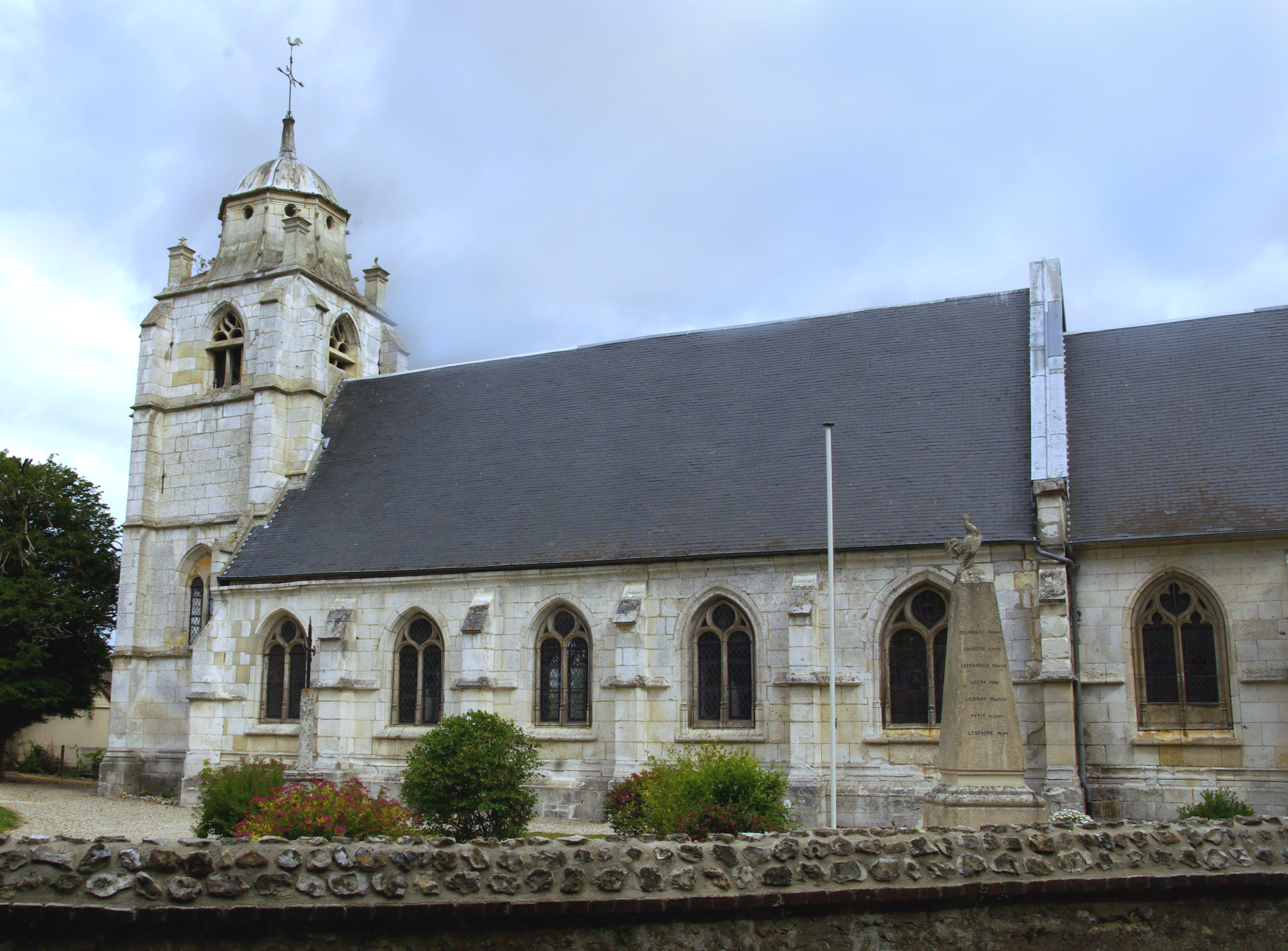
- The church in Hénouville
- Location of Hénouville
- Location within France Location within Normandy
- Coordinates: 49°29′00″N 0°58′00″E
- Country: France
- Region: Normandy
- Department: Seine-Maritime
- Arrondissement: Rouen
- Canton: Barentin
- Intercommunality: Métropole Rouen Normandie

Government
  - Mayor (2026–32): Jean-Marie Royer
- Area^{1}: 10.69 km^{2} (4.13 sq mi)
- Elevation: 125 m (410 ft)
- Highest elevation: 133 m (436 ft)
- Lowest elevation: 2 m (6.6 ft)
- Population (2023): 1,406
  - Density: 131.5/km^{2} (340.6/sq mi)
- Time zone: UTC+01:00 (CET)
  - Summer (DST): UTC+02:00 (CEST)
- INSEE/Postal code: 76354 /76840
- ^{1} French Land Register data, which excludes lakes, ponds, glaciers > 1 km^{2} (0.386 sq mi or 247 acres) and river estuaries.

Hénouville (French pronunciation: [enuvil]) is a commune in the Seine-Maritime department in the Normandy region in northern France.

== Geography ==
A village of forestry and farming by the banks of the river Seine, situated just 6 miles (9.7 km) northwest of the centre of Rouen, at the junction of the D67, D86 and the D982 roads.

== Population ==
Historical population
Year	Pop.	±% p.a.
1968	469	—
1975	526	+1.65%
1982	811	+6.38%
1990	1,088	+3.74%
1999	1,211	+1.20%
2007	1,243	+0.33%
2012	1,234	−0.15%
2017	1,302	+1.08%
2023	1,406	+1.29%
Source: INSEE

== Places of interest ==
- The church of St.Michel, dating from the sixteenth century.
- A fifteenth-century manoir.
- Two sixteenth-century houses.
- An ancient presbytery and 17th-century dovecote.
- Two châteaux: du Perrey and de La Fontaine.

== See also ==
- Communes of the Seine-Maritime department

== Bibliography ==
- Fromager, Gilbert (1986). Le Canton de Duclair à l'aube du XXe siècle. ISBN 2-9501653-0-3.
- Fromager, Gilbert (1993). Le Canton de Duclair 1925-1950. ISBN 2-9501653-1-1.
- Le Patrimoine des communes de la Seine-Maritime. Vol. 1. Flohic. 1997. ISBN 2-84234-017-5.
- Delattre, Daniel (1999). La Seine-Maritime, les 745 communes. Éditions Delattre. ISBN 978-2364640238.
