= Épinay-sur-Duclair =

- Commune
- Location of Épinay-sur-Duclair
- Location within France Location within Normandy
- Coordinates: 49°31′34″N 0°50′08″E
- Country: France
- Region: Normandy
- Department: Seine-Maritime
- Arrondissement: Rouen
- Canton: Barentin
- Intercommunality: Métropole Rouen Normandie

Government
  - Mayor (2020–2026): Catherine Thibaudeau
- Area^{1}: 6.61 km^{2} (2.55 sq mi)
- Elevation: 115 m (377 ft)
- Highest elevation: 125 m (410 ft)
- Lowest elevation: 55 m (180 ft)
- Population (2023): 521
  - Density: 78.8/km^{2} (204/sq mi)
- Time zone: UTC+01:00 (CET)
  - Summer (DST): UTC+02:00 (CEST)
- INSEE/Postal code: 76237 /76480
- ^{1} French Land Register data, which excludes lakes, ponds, glaciers > 1 km^{2} (0.386 sq mi or 247 acres) and river estuaries.

Épinay-sur-Duclair (French pronunciation: [epinɛ syʁ dyklɛʁ], lit. 'Épinay on Duclair') is a commune in the Seine-Maritime department in the Normandy region in northern France.

== Geography ==
A farming village situated in the Pays de Caux, some 13 miles (21 km) northwest of Rouen on the D20 road.

== Population ==
Historical population
Year	Pop.	±% p.a.
1968	219	—
1975	229	+0.64%
1982	265	+2.11%
1990	322	+2.47%
1999	386	+2.03%
2007	500	+3.29%
2012	517	+0.67%
2017	529	+0.46%
2023	521	−0.25%
Source: INSEE

== Places of interest ==
- St. Martin's church, dating from the sixteenth century.
- A sixteenth-century stone cross.

== See also ==
- Communes of the Seine-Maritime department
