= Anneville-Ambourville =

- Commune
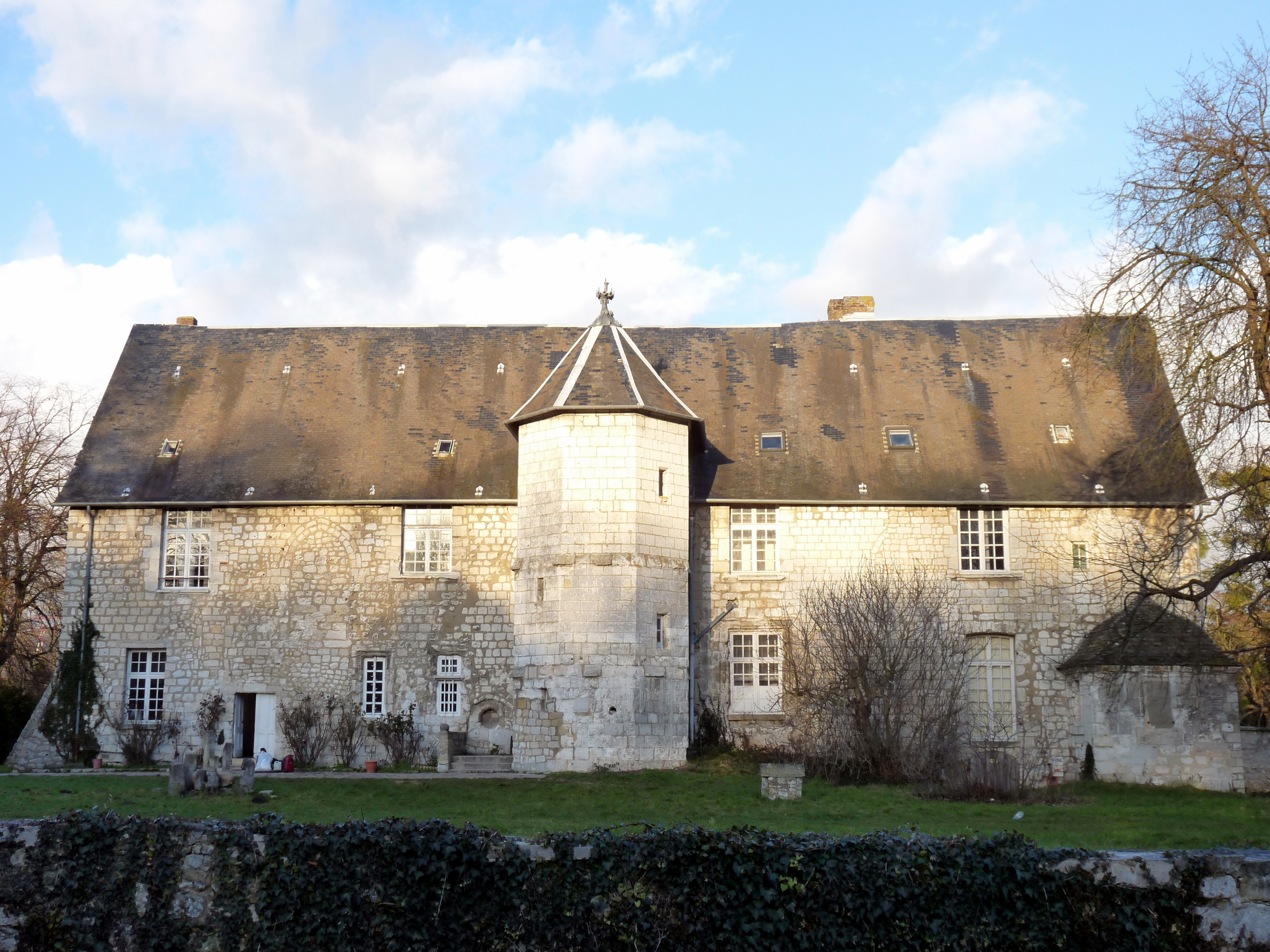
- Cheminée Tournante manor

- Coat of arms
- Location of Anneville-Ambourville
- Location within France Location within Normandy
- Coordinates: 49°27′44″N 0°53′12″E
- Country: France
- Region: Normandy
- Department: Seine-Maritime
- Arrondissement: Rouen
- Canton: Barentin
- Intercommunality: Métropole Rouen Normandie

Government
  - Mayor (2026–32): Éric Lefebvre
- Area^{1}: 20.33 km^{2} (7.85 sq mi)
- Elevation: 15 m (49 ft)
- Highest elevation: 44 m (144 ft)
- Lowest elevation: 1 m (3.3 ft)
- Population (2023): 1,153
  - Density: 56.71/km^{2} (146.9/sq mi)
- Time zone: UTC+01:00 (CET)
  - Summer (DST): UTC+02:00 (CEST)
- INSEE/Postal code: 76020 /76480
- ^{1} French Land Register data, which excludes lakes, ponds, glaciers > 1 km^{2} (0.386 sq mi or 247 acres) and river estuaries.

Anneville-Ambourville (French pronunciation: [anvil ɑ̃buʁvil]) is a commune in the Seine-Maritime department in the Normandy region in northern France.

== Geography ==
Anneville-Ambourville is a quarrying and farming village situated in the Roumois, inside a meander of the river Seine, some 11 miles (18 km) northwest of Rouen near the junction of the D45 with the D64 road.

== Heraldry ==
Arms of Anneville-Ambourville	The arms of Anneville-Ambourville are blazoned : Gules, a bend wavy argent between 2 annulets Or, on a canton overall azure an axe argent.

== Population ==
Historical population
Year	Pop.	±% p.a.
1968	579	—
1975	765	+4.06%
1982	832	+1.21%
1990	986	+2.15%
1999	946	−0.46%
2007	1,166	+2.65%
2012	1,212	+0.78%
2017	1,190	−0.37%
2023	1,153	−0.53%
Source: INSEE

== Places of interest ==
- The thirteenth-century château d'Ambourville, known as the 'Templars manorhouse', with an octagonal dovecote.
- The château des Girouettes (or the manor of the Grand-Hôtel) with a 17th-century dovecote and chapel.
- The sixteenth-century Brescy manorhouse.
- The Manor de La Cheminée Tournante, dating from the seventeenth century.
- The church of St.Remi, dating from the sixteenth century.
- The church of Notre-Dame, dating from the sixteenth century.
- The sixteenth-century stone cross.

== See also ==
- Communes of the Seine-Maritime department
