= Roumois =

Coordinates: 49.36°N 0.76°E

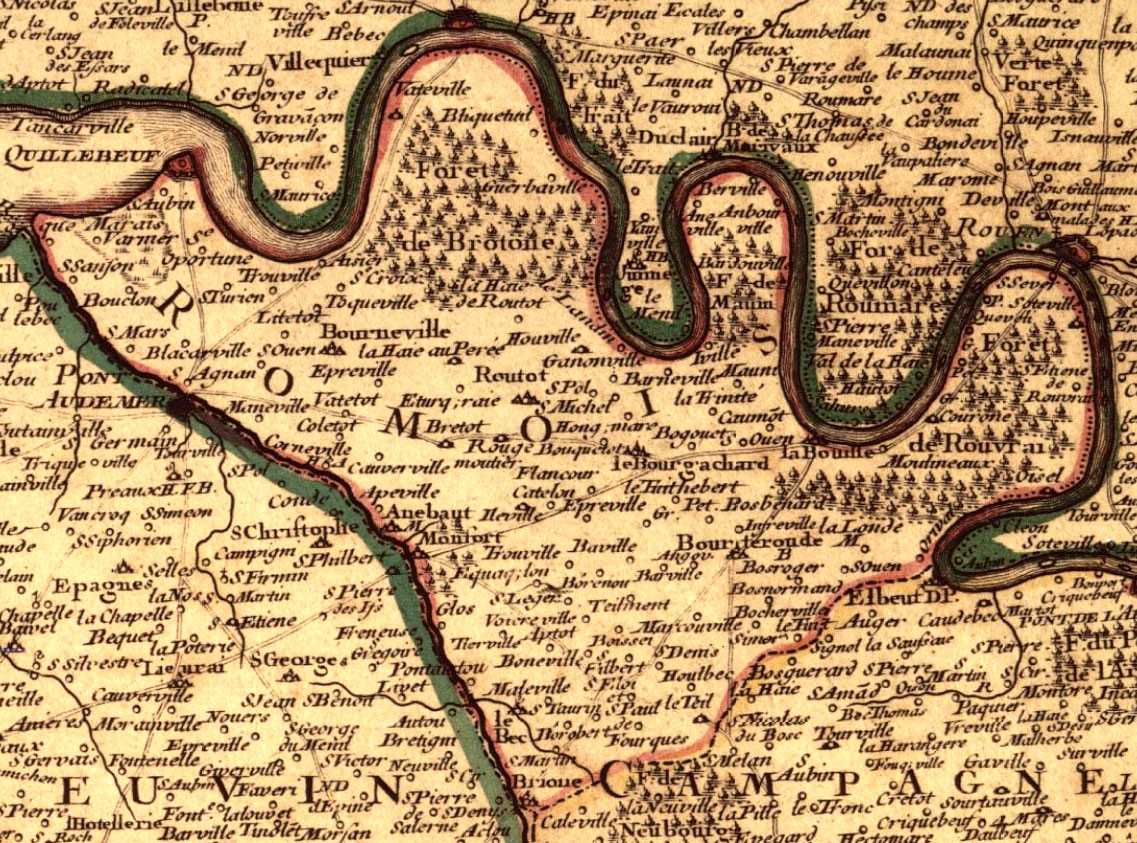
Map of the Roumois, 1716

The Roumois (French: [ʁumwa]) is a region in the northwestern part of the Eure département in Normandy, France. It is a plateau situated southwest of Rouen. Its northern boundary is the Seine downstream of Elbeuf, its western boundary is the Risle valley. The plain of Le Neubourg lies to the south. The main towns of the Roumois are Bourg-Achard and Bourgtheroulde-Infreville. The landscape is similar to that of the Pays de Caux on the north side of the Seine.

The economy is mainly based on agriculture, but it is also influenced by the nearby Rouen agglomeration.

== History ==
Encyclopédie Méthodique
