= Duclair =

- Commune
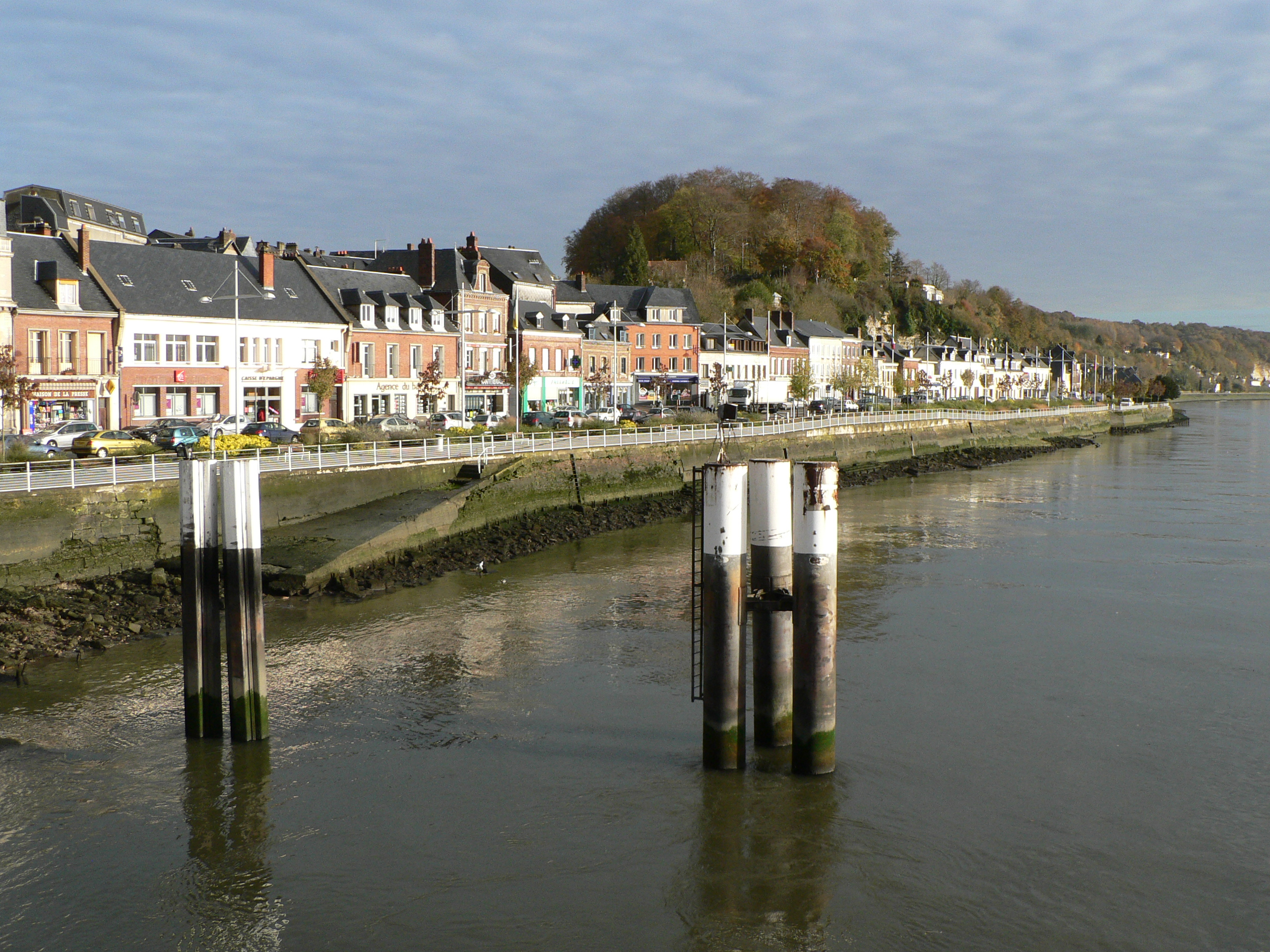
- The Seine riverside at Duclair

- Coat of arms
- Location of Duclair
- Location within France Location within Normandy
- Coordinates: 49°29′08″N 0°52′34″E
- Country: France
- Region: Normandy
- Department: Seine-Maritime
- Arrondissement: Rouen
- Canton: Barentin
- Intercommunality: Métropole Rouen Normandie

Government
  - Mayor (2026–32): Jean Delalandre
- Area^{1}: 10.02 km^{2} (3.87 sq mi)
- Elevation: 10 m (33 ft)
- Highest elevation: 122 m (400 ft)
- Lowest elevation: 1 m (3.3 ft)
- Population (2023): 3,996
  - Density: 398.8/km^{2} (1,033/sq mi)
- Time zone: UTC+01:00 (CET)
  - Summer (DST): UTC+02:00 (CEST)
- INSEE/Postal code: 76222 /76480
- ^{1} French Land Register data, which excludes lakes, ponds, glaciers > 1 km^{2} (0.386 sq mi or 247 acres) and river estuaries.

Duclair (French pronunciation: [dyklɛʁ]) is a commune in the Seine-Maritime department in the Normandy region in northern France. The Duclair duck is named after the town, of which pressed duck (canard à la presse) is invented.

== Geography ==
Duclair is a farming and light industrial town situated some 11 miles (18 km) west of the centre of Rouen at the junction of the D43, D5 and the D982 roads. The river Austreberthe joins the Seine at Duclair. There is a ferry to Berville-sur-Seine on the south bank of the Seine.

== Heraldry ==
Arms of Duclair	The arms of Duclair are blazoned : Per fess 1: per pale I: Azure, a duck volant contourny both wings pointing down argent; II: Or, an apple tree fructed proper on a base vert; 2: Azure, 3 fish contourny argent.

== Population ==
Historical population
Year	Pop.	±% p.a.
1968	2,705	—
1975	2,975	+1.37%
1982	3,487	+2.29%
1990	3,822	+1.15%
1999	4,163	+0.95%
2007	4,094	−0.21%
2012	4,094	+0.00%
2017	4,198	+0.50%
2023	3,996	−0.82%
Source: INSEE

== Cuisine ==
Duclair is known for its duck, which evolved from a crossbreeding of domestic and migratory wild ducks. Beginning in the 17th century, these ducks would be hunted for flesh, which was regarded as tender and tasty. As farmers would protect their ducks from the rainy and windy weather of Normandy, sometimes these ducks would suffocate to death. In the late 19th century, an innkeeper named Henri "Père" Denise realized that suffocated ducks with intact blood make for more tender meat, and began purchasing suffocated ducks at discounted prices. He is credited with the invention of a new dish called pressed duck (canard à la presse), which involves serving the duck in its own blood. Since then, this has been the specialty dish of the commune.

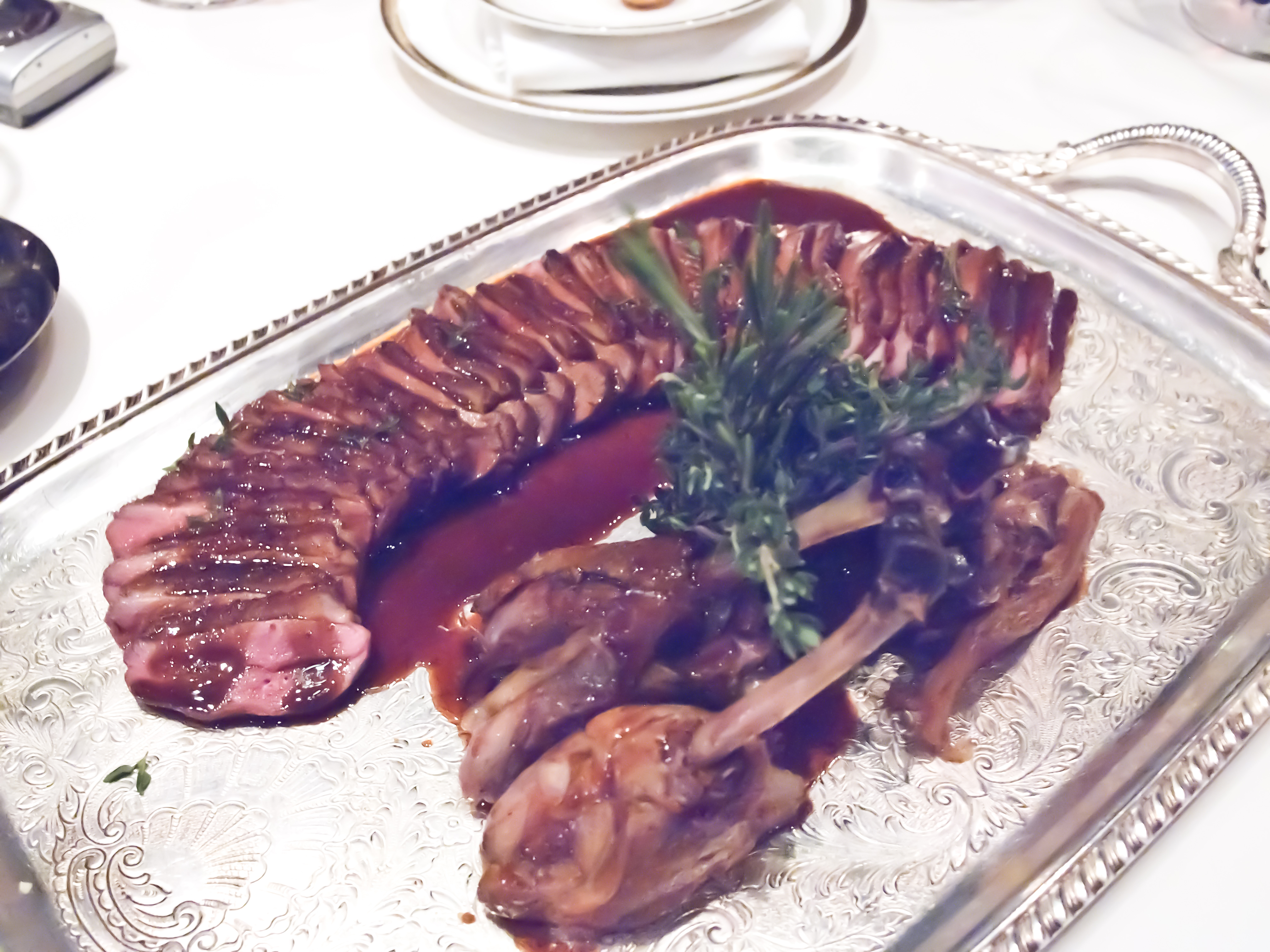
A serving of canard à la presse.

== Places of interest ==
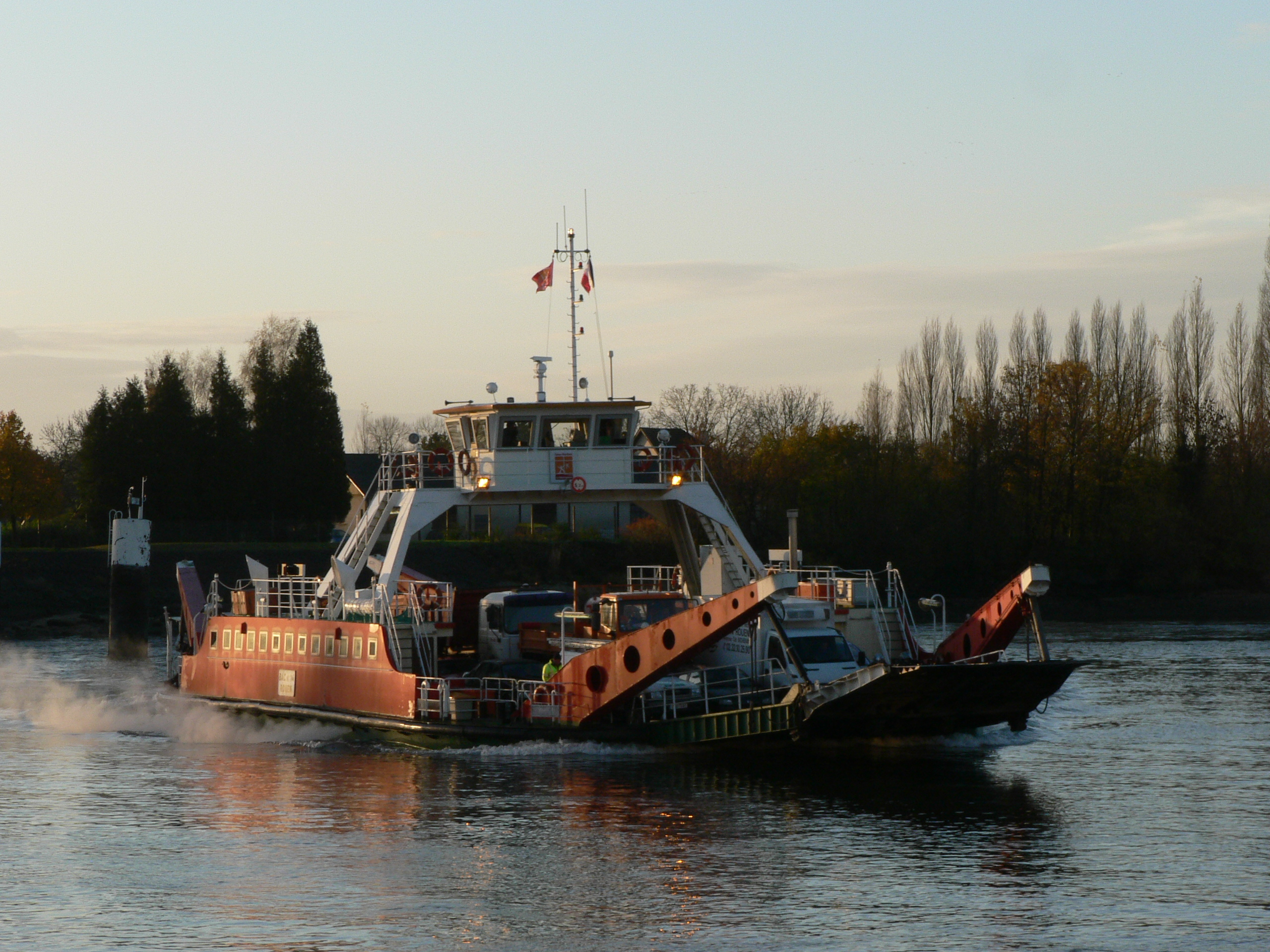
Ferry between Berville-sur-Seine and Duclair

- The church of St. Denis, dating to the 12th century.
- Traces of a feudal castle.
- Remains of a 13th-century presbytery.
- The Château du Taillis, dating to medieval times.
- The 18th-century Château du Vaurouy.
- La Cour-du-Mont manor house with parts dating to the 13th century.
- A 17th-century chapel.

== Notable people ==
- Musician Pierre Villette (1926–1998) was born here.

== Twin towns ==
Ronnenberg, Germany

== See also ==
- Communes of the Seine-Maritime department

== Bibliography ==
- Francis Aubert, Duclair, un regard sur le passé, Duclair, 2002 ISBN 2-9519259-0-5
- Ariane Duclert, "Le Caneton à la rouennaise, spécialité de Duclair", Pays de Normandie ISSN 1266-1341
- Gilbert Fromager, Le Canton of Duclair à l'aube du XXe, Duclair, 1986 ISBN 2-9501653-0-3
