= Canton of Buchy =

Coordinates: 49°32′47″N 1°20′35″E

Buchy
- Former canton
- Interactive map of Buchy
- Country: France
- Region: Normandy
- Department: Seine-Maritime
- No. of communes: {{{nbcomm}}}
- Disbanded: 2015
- Area: 158.13 km^{2} (61.05 sq mi)
- Population (2012): 10,781
  - Density: 68.178/km^{2} (176.58/sq mi)

The Canton of Buchy is a former canton situated in the Seine-Maritime département and in the Haute-Normandie region of northern France. It was disbanded following the French canton reorganisation which came into effect in March 2015. It consisted of 21 communes, which joined the canton of Le Mesnil-Esnard in 2015. It had a total of 10,781 inhabitants (2012).

== Geography ==
A farming area in the arrondissement of Rouen, centred on the town of Buchy. The elevation varies from 80 metres (260 ft) (Saint-Aignan-sur-Ry) to 236 metres (774 ft) (Bosc-Bordel) with an average elevation of 168 metres (551 ft) above sea level.

The canton comprised 21 communes:

- Bierville
- Blainville-Crevon
- Bois-Guilbert
- Bois-Héroult
- Boissay
- Bosc-Bordel
- Bosc-Édeline
- Bosc-Roger-sur-Buchy
- Buchy
- Catenay
- Ernemont-sur-Buchy
- Estouteville-Écalles
- Héronchelles
- Longuerue
- Morgny-la-Pommeraye
- Pierreval
- Rebets
- Saint-Aignan-sur-Ry
- Sainte-Croix-sur-Buchy
- Saint-Germain-des-Essourts
- Vieux-Manoir

== Population ==
Historical population Canton of Buchy
Year	1962	1968	1975	1982	1990	1999
Pop.	5,293	5,790	6,292	7,651	8,692	9,228
±%	—	+9.4%	+8.7%	+21.6%	+13.6%	+6.2%
From the year 1962 on: No double counting – residents of multiple communes (e.g. students and military personnel) are counted only once. Source: INSEE

== See also ==
- Arrondissements of the Seine-Maritime department
- Cantons of the Seine-Maritime department
- Communes of the Seine-Maritime department
