= Canton of Boos =

Coordinates: 49°23′04″N 1°11′00″E

Boos
- Former canton
- Interactive map of Boos
- Country: France
- Region: Normandy
- Department: Seine-Maritime
- No. of communes: {{{nbcomm}}}
- Disbanded: 2015
- Area: 108.31 km^{2} (41.82 sq mi)
- Population (2012): 38,802
  - Density: 358.25/km^{2} (927.86/sq mi)

The Canton of Boos is a former canton situated in the Seine-Maritime département and in the Haute-Normandie region of northern France. It was disbanded following the French canton reorganisation which came into effect in March 2015. It had a total of 38,802 inhabitants (2012).

== Geography ==
An area of farming and light industry in the arrondissement of Rouen, centred on the town of Boos. The altitude varies from 2m (Les Authieux-sur-le-Port-Saint-Ouen) to 162m (Le Mesnil-Esnard) with an average altitude of 142m.

The canton comprised 15 communes:

- Amfreville-la-Mi-Voie
- Les Authieux-sur-le-Port-Saint-Ouen
- Belbeuf
- Bonsecours
- Boos
- Fresne-le-Plan
- Gouy
- Le Mesnil-Esnard
- Mesnil-Raoul
- Montmain
- La Neuville-Chant-d'Oisel
- Franqueville-Saint-Pierre
- Quévreville-la-Poterie
- Saint-Aubin-Celloville
- Ymare

== Population ==
Historical population Canton of Boos
Year	1962	1968	1975	1982	1990	1999
Pop.	14,701	16,371	21,066	26,524	32,348	35,567
±%	—	+11.4%	+28.7%	+25.9%	+22.0%	+10.0%
From the year 1962 on: No double counting – residents of multiple communes (e.g. students and military personnel) are counted only once. Source: INSEE

== See also ==
- Arrondissements of the Seine-Maritime department
- Cantons of the Seine-Maritime department
- Communes of the Seine-Maritime department
