= La Rue-Saint-Pierre, Seine-Maritime =

La Rue-Saint-Pierre
- Commune
- Location of La Rue-Saint-Pierre
- Location within France Location within Normandy
- Coordinates: 49°33′52″N 1°14′51″E
- Country: France
- Region: Normandy
- Department: Seine-Maritime
- Arrondissement: Rouen
- Canton: Le Mesnil-Esnard

Government
  - Mayor (2026–32): Bruno Léger
- Area^{1}: 7.68 km^{2} (2.97 sq mi)
- Elevation: 165 m (541 ft)
- Highest elevation: 182 m (597 ft)
- Lowest elevation: 126 m (413 ft)
- Population (2023): 800
  - Density: 100/km^{2} (270/sq mi)
- Time zone: UTC+01:00 (CET)
  - Summer (DST): UTC+02:00 (CEST)
- INSEE/Postal code: 76547 /76690
- ^{1} French Land Register data, which excludes lakes, ponds, glaciers > 1 km^{2} (0.386 sq mi or 247 acres) and river estuaries.

La Rue-Saint-Pierre (French pronunciation: [la ʁy sɛ̃ pjɛʁ]) is a commune in the Seine-Maritime department in the Normandy region in northern France. It belongs to the Arrondissement of Rouen and the Canton of Le Mesnil-Esnard (until 2015 Canton of Clères). The inhabitants are called Bocassiens .

== Geography ==
A village of farming and a little light industry, situated in the Pays de Caux some 13 miles (21 km) northeast of Rouen, at the junction of the D6, D15 and the D928 roads. La Rue-Saint-Pierre is surrounded by the neighboring villages of Yquebeuf in the north, Estouteville-Écalles in the north-east, Vieux-Manoir in the east, Longuerue in the south-east, Pierreval in the south, Saint-André-sur-Cailly in the west and southwest, and Cailly in the north-west.

The A28 autoroute passes through the commune's south-eastern section.

== Politics and Administration ==
List of successive mayors
Period		Identity	Current
	1985	Jacques Pollet	Died in office
1985	2008	René Dubos	
2008	In progress	Bruno Léger	Vice-president of the Moulin d'Écalles CC (2014 →) Re-elected for the 2020–2026 term

== Population ==
Historical population
Year	Pop.	±% p.a.
1968	249	—
1975	290	+2.20%
1982	317	+1.28%
1990	346	+1.10%
1999	379	+1.02%
2007	601	+5.93%
2012	746	+4.42%
2017	785	+1.02%
2023	800	+0.32%
Source: INSEE

== Places of interest ==
- The church of St. Pierre, dating from the sixteenth century.
- A chapel and manor house at Mesnil-Godefroy.

== See also ==
- Communes of the Seine-Maritime department
