= Buchy =

Buchy is the name or part of the name of the following communes in France:

- Buchy, Moselle, in the Moselle department
- Buchy, Seine-Maritime, in the Seine-Maritime department
- Bosc-Roger-sur-Buchy, in the Seine-Maritime department
- Ernemont-sur-Buchy, in the Seine-Maritime department
- Sainte-Croix-sur-Buchy, in the Seine-Maritime department
