= Saint-Denis-le-Thiboult =

- Commune
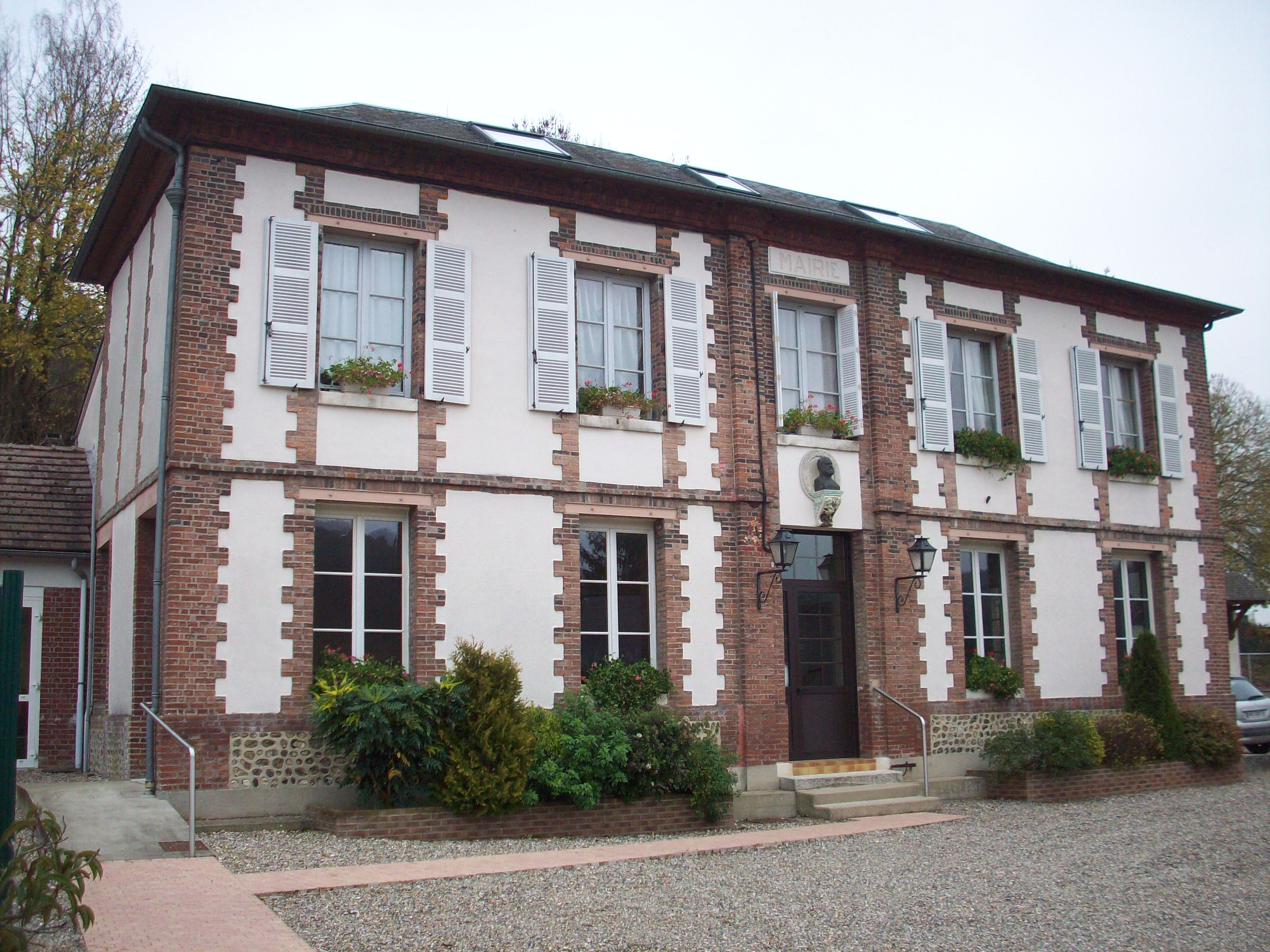
- The town hall in Saint-Denis-le-Thiboult
- Location of Saint-Denis-le-Thiboult
- Location within France Location within Normandy
- Coordinates: 49°27′36″N 1°21′50″E
- Country: France
- Region: Normandy
- Department: Seine-Maritime
- Arrondissement: Rouen
- Canton: Le Mesnil-Esnard

Government
  - Mayor (2020–2026): François Delnott
- Area^{1}: 10.25 km^{2} (3.96 sq mi)
- Elevation: 65 m (213 ft)
- Highest elevation: 161 m (528 ft)
- Lowest elevation: 56 m (184 ft)
- Population (2023): 502
  - Density: 49.0/km^{2} (127/sq mi)
- Time zone: UTC+01:00 (CET)
  - Summer (DST): UTC+02:00 (CEST)
- INSEE/Postal code: 76573 /76116
- ^{1} French Land Register data, which excludes lakes, ponds, glaciers > 1 km^{2} (0.386 sq mi or 247 acres) and river estuaries.

Saint-Denis-le-Thiboult is a commune in the Seine-Maritime department in the Normandy region in northern France.

== Geography ==
A farming village situated in the Pays de Bray between Ry and Vascœuil, some 12 miles (19 km) east of Rouen near the junction of the D12 and the N31 roads. The small river Crevon, a tributary of the Andelle, flows through the commune.

== Population ==
Historical population
Year	Pop.	±% p.a.
1968	295	—
1975	341	+2.09%
1982	409	+2.63%
1990	471	+1.78%
1999	490	+0.44%
2007	506	+0.40%
2012	512	+0.24%
2017	504	−0.31%
2023	502	−0.07%
Source: INSEE

== Places of interest ==
- The church of St. Denis, dating from the thirteenth century.
- A sixteenth-century manorhouse with a dovecote.
- The chateau of Ventes.
- A feudal motte and walls.

== See also ==
- Communes of the Seine-Maritime department
