= Servaville-Salmonville =

- Commune
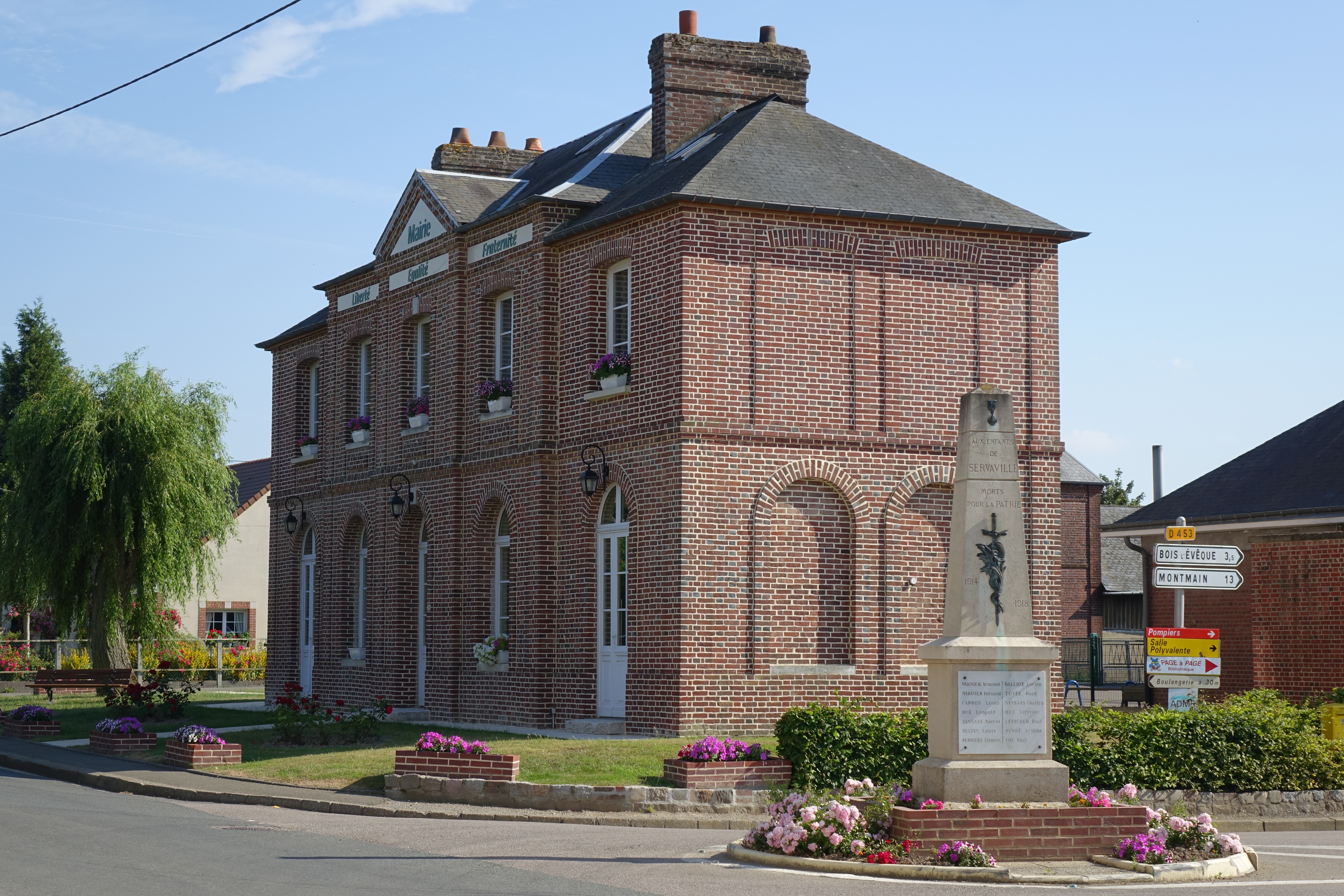
- The town hall in Servaville-Salmonville
- Location of Servaville-Salmonville
- Location within France Location within Normandy
- Coordinates: 49°28′37″N 1°16′20″E
- Country: France
- Region: Normandy
- Department: Seine-Maritime
- Arrondissement: Rouen
- Canton: Le Mesnil-Esnard
- Intercommunality: CC Inter-Caux-Vexin

Government
  - Mayor (2026–32): Julien Glück
- Area^{1}: 7.85 km^{2} (3.03 sq mi)
- Elevation: 165 m (541 ft)
- Highest elevation: 172 m (564 ft)
- Lowest elevation: 148 m (486 ft)
- Population (2023): 1,111
  - Density: 142/km^{2} (367/sq mi)
- Time zone: UTC+01:00 (CET)
  - Summer (DST): UTC+02:00 (CEST)
- INSEE/Postal code: 76673 /76116
- ^{1} French Land Register data, which excludes lakes, ponds, glaciers > 1 km^{2} (0.386 sq mi or 247 acres) and river estuaries.

Servaville-Salmonville (French pronunciation: [sɛʁvavil salmɔ̃vil]) is a commune in the Seine-Maritime department in the Normandy region in northern France.

== Geography ==
A farming village situated in Normandy, some 8 miles (13 km) east of Rouen at the junction of the D7, D62 and the D453 roads. The N31 road forms the commune's southern border.

== Population ==
Historical population
Year	Pop.	±% p.a.
1968	308	—
1975	460	+5.90%
1982	523	+1.85%
1990	647	+2.70%
1999	778	+2.07%
2007	1,047	+3.78%
2012	1,069	+0.42%
2017	1,133	+1.17%
2023	1,111	−0.33%
Source: INSEE

== Places of interest ==
- The church of St. Clement, dating from the thirteenth century.
- A seventeenth-century stone cross.
- The eighteenth-century manorhouse of Hémaudière.

== See also ==
- Communes of the Seine-Maritime department
