= Martainville-Épreville =

- Commune
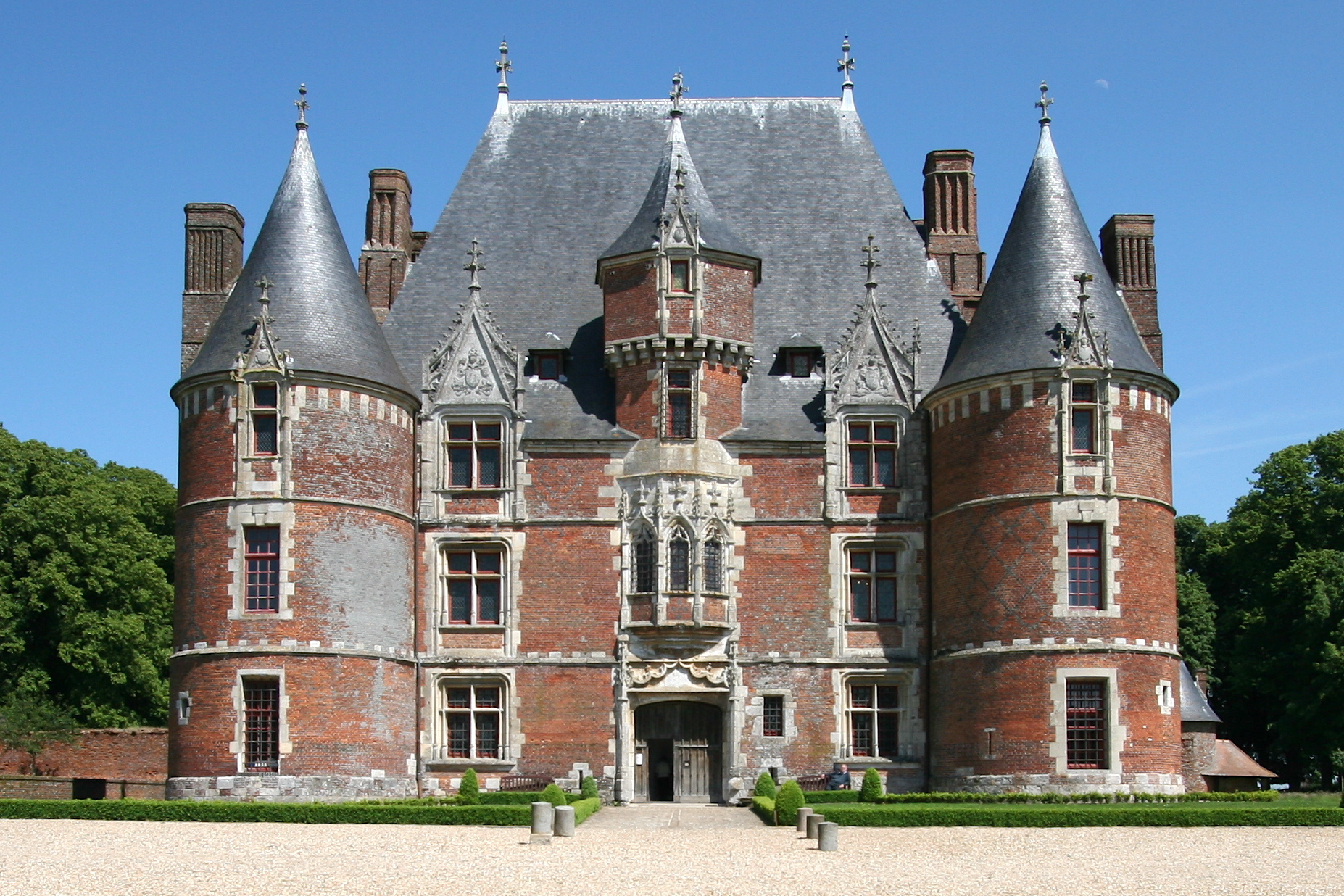
- Martainville Castle

- Coat of arms
- Location of Martainville-Épreville
- Location within France Location within Normandy
- Coordinates: 49°27′38″N 1°17′31″E
- Country: France
- Region: Normandy
- Department: Seine-Maritime
- Arrondissement: Rouen
- Canton: Le Mesnil-Esnard
- Intercommunality: Inter-Caux-Vexin

Government
  - Mayor (2020–2026): Lionel Saillard
- Area^{1}: 7.61 km^{2} (2.94 sq mi)
- Elevation: 152 m (499 ft)
- Highest elevation: 162 m (531 ft)
- Lowest elevation: 138 m (453 ft)
- Population (2023): 746
  - Density: 98.0/km^{2} (254/sq mi)
- Time zone: UTC+01:00 (CET)
  - Summer (DST): UTC+02:00 (CEST)
- INSEE/Postal code: 76412 /76116
- ^{1} French Land Register data, which excludes lakes, ponds, glaciers > 1 km^{2} (0.386 sq mi or 247 acres) and river estuaries.

Martainville-Épreville (French pronunciation: [maʁtɛ̃vil epʁəvil]) is a commune in the Seine-Maritime department in the Normandy region in north-western France.

== Geography ==
A farming village, with some associated light industry, situated some 12 miles (19 km) east of Rouen at the junction of the D 85, D 13 and the N 31 (former N 30) roads.

== Heraldry ==
| Arms of Martainville-Épreville | The arms of Martainville-Épreville are blazoned : Argent, on a fess azure, 3 bezants [Or]. |

== Population ==
Historical population
| Year | Pop. | ±% p.a. |
|---|---|---|
| 1968 | 438 | — |
| 1975 | 515 | +2.34% |
| 1982 | 599 | +2.18% |
| 1990 | 606 | +0.15% |
| 1999 | 611 | +0.09% |
| 2007 | 692 | +1.57% |
| 2012 | 717 | +0.71% |
| 2017 | 697 | −0.56% |
| 2023 | 746 | +1.14% |
Source: INSEE

== Places of interest ==
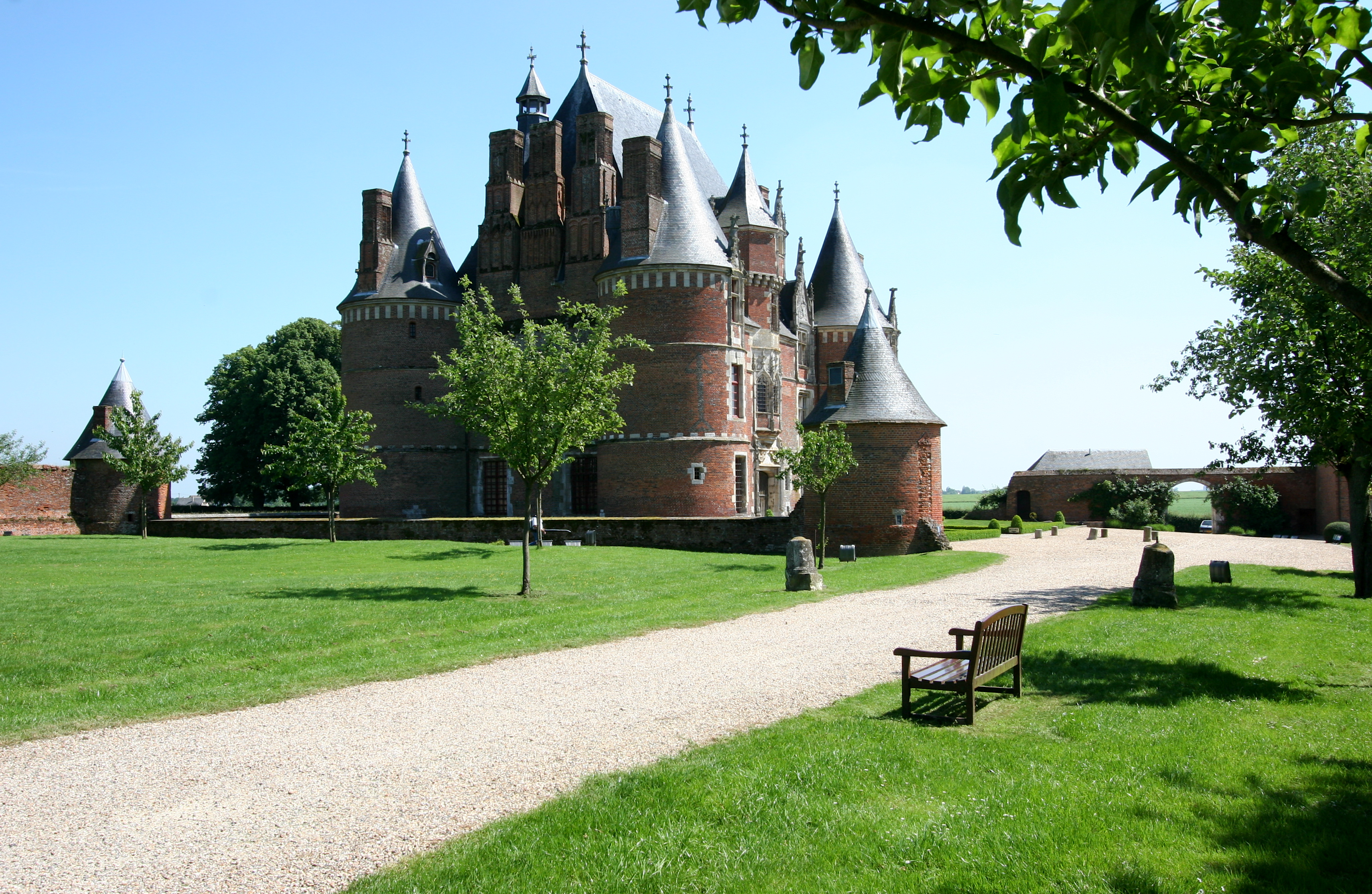
Martainville Castle

- The fifteenth-century Château de Martainville castle, with its dovecote, gardens and a museum.
- The churches of St. Ouen and of Notre-Dame, both dating from the seventeenth century.

== See also ==
- Communes of the Seine-Maritime department
