= Grainville-sur-Ry =

- Commune
- Location of Grainville-sur-Ry
- Location within France Location within Normandy
- Coordinates: 49°28′43″N 1°18′04″E
- Country: France
- Region: Normandy
- Department: Seine-Maritime
- Arrondissement: Rouen
- Canton: Le Mesnil-Esnard

Government
  - Mayor (2020–2026): Jean-Pierre Bertrand
- Area^{1}: 5.38 km^{2} (2.08 sq mi)
- Elevation: 158 m (518 ft)
- Highest elevation: 167 m (548 ft)
- Lowest elevation: 103 m (338 ft)
- Population (2023): 438
  - Density: 81.4/km^{2} (211/sq mi)
- Time zone: UTC+01:00 (CET)
  - Summer (DST): UTC+02:00 (CEST)
- INSEE/Postal code: 76316 /76116
- ^{1} French Land Register data, which excludes lakes, ponds, glaciers > 1 km^{2} (0.386 sq mi or 247 acres) and river estuaries.

Grainville-sur-Ry (French pronunciation: [ɡʁɛ̃vil syʁ ʁi], literally Grainville on Ry) is a commune in the Seine-Maritime department in the Normandy region in northern France.

== Geography ==
A farming and forestry village situated some 11 miles (18 km) east of Rouen, at the junction of the D62 and the D7a roads.

== Population ==
Historical population
Year	Pop.	±% p.a.
1968	222	—
1975	234	+0.75%
1982	360	+6.35%
1990	382	+0.74%
1999	479	+2.55%
2007	462	−0.45%
2012	441	−0.93%
2017	446	+0.23%
2023	438	−0.30%
Source: INSEE

== Places of interest ==
- The church of St. Pierre and Paul, dating from the twelfth century.
- A small manor house.

== See also ==
- Communes of the Seine-Maritime department
