= Auzouville-sur-Ry =

- Commune
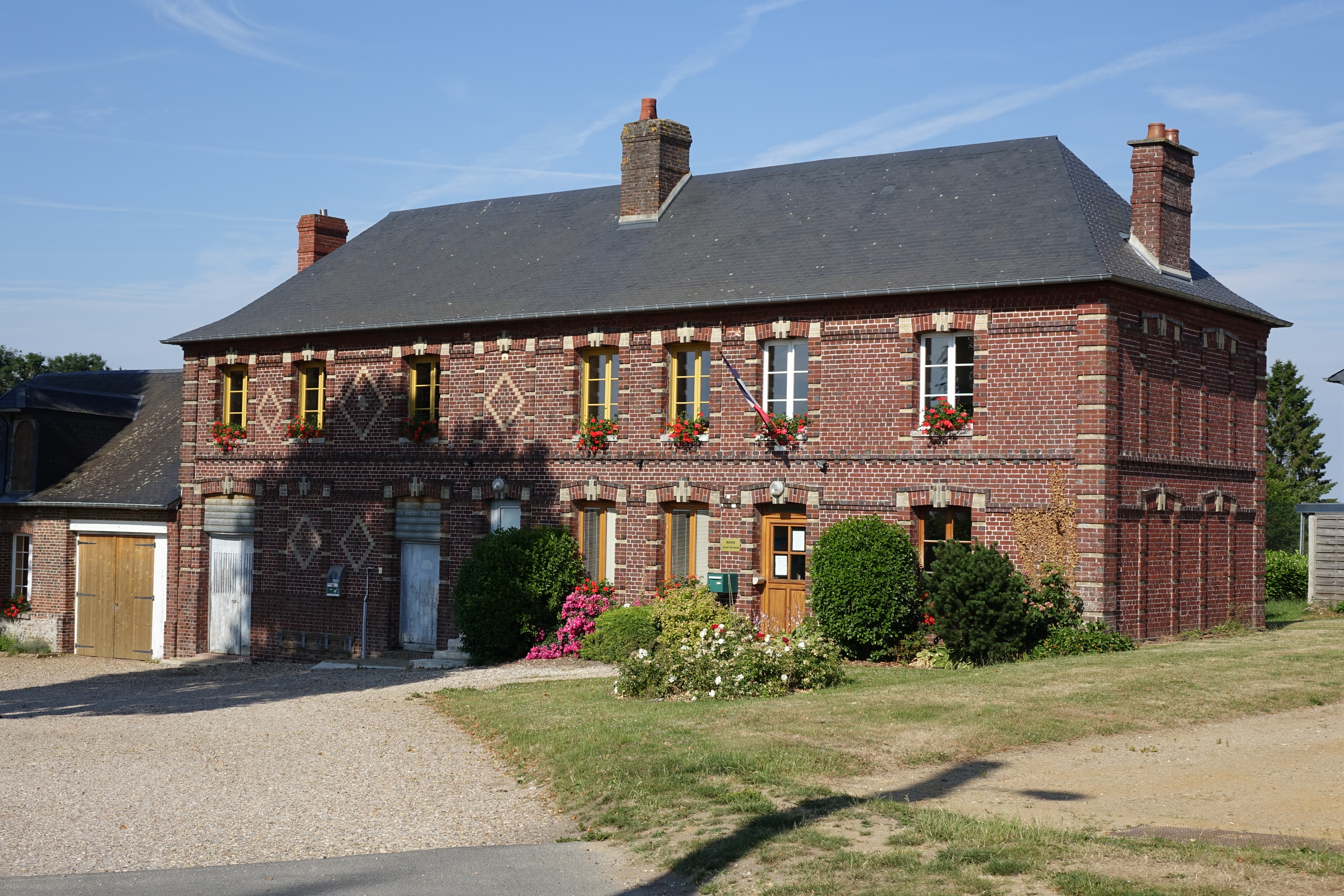
- The town hall in Auzouville-sur-Ry

- Coat of arms
- Location of Auzouville-sur-Ry
- Location within France Location within Normandy
- Coordinates: 49°26′32″N 1°18′45″E
- Country: France
- Region: Normandy
- Department: Seine-Maritime
- Arrondissement: Rouen
- Canton: Le Mesnil-Esnard
- Intercommunality: CC Inter-Caux-Vexin

Government
  - Mayor (2020–2026): Annie Jegat
- Area^{1}: 7.98 km^{2} (3.08 sq mi)
- Elevation: 120 m (390 ft)
- Highest elevation: 156 m (512 ft)
- Lowest elevation: 90 m (300 ft)
- Population (2023): 683
  - Density: 85.6/km^{2} (222/sq mi)
- Time zone: UTC+01:00 (CET)
  - Summer (DST): UTC+02:00 (CEST)
- INSEE/Postal code: 76046 /76116
- ^{1} French Land Register data, which excludes lakes, ponds, glaciers > 1 km^{2} (0.386 sq mi or 247 acres) and river estuaries.

Auzouville-sur-Ry (French pronunciation: [ozuvil syʁ ʁi], literally Auzouville on Ry) is a commune in the Seine-Maritime department, located in the Normandy region of north-western France.

== Geography ==
Auzouville-sur-Ry is a farming village situated in the Rouennais, approximately 10 miles (16 km) east of Rouen, at the junction of the D 43, D 93 and, the D 13 roads.

== Heraldry ==
Arms of Auzouville-sur-Ry	The arms of Auzouville-sur-Ry are blazoned : Argent, a bend sinister azure voided of the field and charged with the motto "chante et pleure" sable, between, in chief 2 leopards azure and in base a water-bouget azure voided of the field. (the charge in base is a 'chantepleure' in French and this is canting arms.)

== Population ==
Historical population
Year	Pop.	±% p.a.
1968	428	—
1975	431	+0.10%
1982	510	+2.43%
1990	601	+2.07%
1999	577	−0.45%
2007	606	+0.61%
2012	660	+1.72%
2017	733	+2.12%
2023	683	−1.17%
Source: INSEE

== Places of interest ==
- The château of Lesques, dating from the seventeenth century.
- The church of Notre-Dame, dating from the seventeenth century.

== See also ==
- Communes of the Seine-Maritime department
