= Arrondissement of Rouen =

Coordinates: 49°26′N 1°06′E

Rouen
- Arrondissement
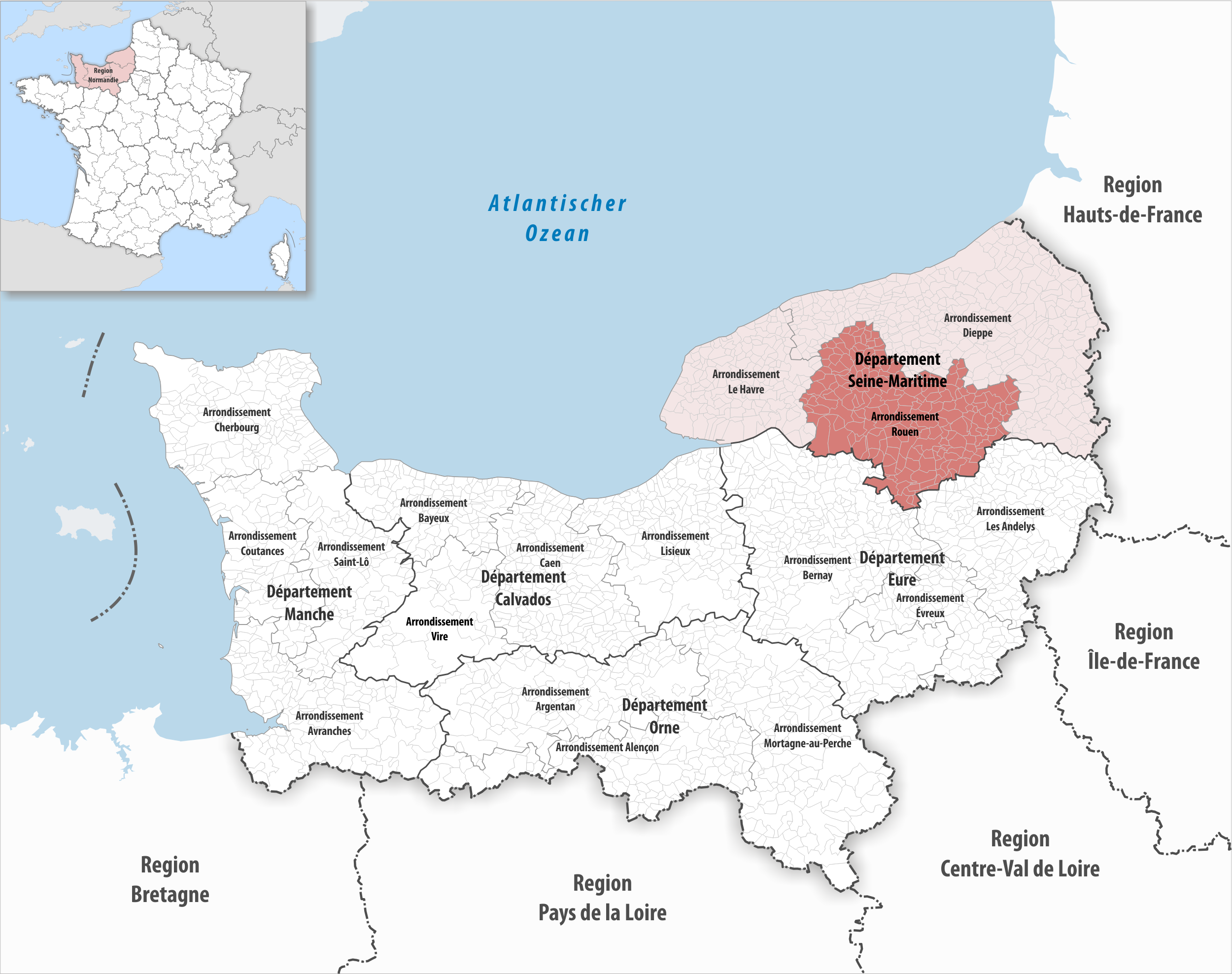
- Location within the region Normandy
- Country: France
- Region: Normandy
- Department: Seine-Maritime
- No. of communes: {{{nbcomm}}}
- Area: 1,936.2 km^{2} (747.6 sq mi)
- Population (2023): 645,412
  - Density: 333.34/km^{2} (863.35/sq mi)
- INSEE code: 763

The Arrondissement of Rouen is an arrondissement of France in the Seine-Maritime department in the Normandy region. It has 216 communes. Its population is 639,363 (2021), and its area is 1,936.2 km^{2} (747.6 sq mi).

== Composition ==
The communes of the arrondissement of Rouen, and their INSEE codes, are:

1. Allouville-Bellefosse (76001)
2. Amfreville-la-Mi-Voie (76005)
3. Amfreville-les-Champs (76006)
4. Anceaumeville (76007)
5. Ancretiéville-Saint-Victor (76010)
6. Anneville-Ambourville (76020)
7. Anquetierville (76022)
8. Anvéville (76023)
9. Arelaune-en-Seine (76401)
10. Authieux-Ratiéville (76038)
11. Les Authieux-sur-le-Port-Saint-Ouen (76039)
12. Auzebosc (76043)
13. Auzouville-l'Esneval (76045)
14. Auzouville-sur-Ry (76046)
15. Baons-le-Comte (76055)
16. Bardouville (76056)
17. Barentin (76057)
18. Beaumont-le-Hareng (76062)
19. Belbeuf (76069)
20. Bénesville (76077)
21. Berville-en-Caux (76087)
22. Berville-sur-Seine (76088)
23. Bierville (76094)
24. Bihorel (76095)
25. Blacqueville (76099)
26. Blainville-Crevon (76100)
27. Le Bocasse (76105)
28. Bois-d'Ennebourg (76106)
29. Bois-Guilbert (76107)
30. Bois-Guillaume (76108)
31. Bois-Héroult (76109)
32. Bois-Himont (76110)
33. Bois-l'Évêque (76111)
34. Boissay (76113)
35. Bonsecours (76103)
36. Boos (76116)
37. Bosc-Bordel (76120)
38. Bosc-Édeline (76121)
39. Bosc-Guérard-Saint-Adrien (76123)
40. Bosc-le-Hard (76125)
41. Boudeville (76129)
42. La Bouille (76131)
43. Bourdainville (76132)
44. Bouville (76135)
45. Bretteville-Saint-Laurent (76144)
46. Buchy (76146)
47. Butot (76149)
48. Cailly (76152)
49. Canteleu (76157)
50. Canville-les-Deux-Églises (76158)
51. Carville-la-Folletière (76160)
52. Carville-Pot-de-Fer (76161)
53. Catenay (76163)
54. Caudebec-lès-Elbeuf (76165)
55. Cideville (76174)
56. Claville-Motteville (76177)
57. Cléon (76178)
58. Clères (76179)
59. Cottévrard (76188)
60. Criquetot-sur-Ouville (76198)
61. Croix-Mare (76203)
62. Darnétal (76212)
63. Déville-lès-Rouen (76216)
64. Doudeville (76219)
65. Duclair (76222)
66. Écalles-Alix (76223)
67. Écretteville-lès-Baons (76225)
68. Ectot-l'Auber (76227)
69. Ectot-lès-Baons (76228)
70. Elbeuf (76231)
71. Elbeuf-sur-Andelle (76230)
72. Émanville (76234)
73. Épinay-sur-Duclair (76237)
74. Ernemont-sur-Buchy (76243)
75. Eslettes (76245)
76. Esteville (76247)
77. Étalleville (76251)
78. Étoutteville (76253)
79. Flamanville (76264)
80. Fontaine-le-Bourg (76271)
81. Fontaine-sous-Préaux (76273)
82. Franqueville-Saint-Pierre (76475)
83. Freneuse (76282)
84. Fresne-le-Plan (76285)
85. Fresquiennes (76287)
86. Frichemesnil (76290)
87. Fultot (76293)
88. Gonzeville (76309)
89. Goupillières (76311)
90. Gouy (76313)
91. Grainville-sur-Ry (76316)
92. Grand-Couronne (76319)
93. Le Grand-Quevilly (76322)
94. Grémonville (76325)
95. Grigneuseville (76328)
96. Grugny (76331)
97. Harcanville (76340)
98. Hautot-le-Vatois (76347)
99. Hautot-Saint-Sulpice (76348)
100. Hautot-sur-Seine (76350)
101. Les Hauts-de-Caux (76041)
102. Hénouville (76354)
103. Héricourt-en-Caux (76355)
104. Héronchelles (76359)
105. Heurteauville (76362)
106. Le Houlme (76366)
107. Houppeville (76367)
108. La Houssaye-Béranger (76369)
109. Hugleville-en-Caux (76370)
110. Isneauville (76377)
111. Jumièges (76378)
112. Limésy (76385)
113. Lindebeuf (76387)
114. La Londe (76391)
115. Longuerue (76396)
116. Louvetot (76398)
117. Malaunay (76402)
118. Maromme (76410)
119. Martainville-Épreville (76412)
120. Maulévrier-Sainte-Gertrude (76418)
121. Mauny (76419)
122. Le Mesnil-Esnard (76429)
123. Mesnil-Panneville (76433)
124. Mesnil-Raoul (76434)
125. Le Mesnil-sous-Jumièges (76436)
126. Mont-Cauvaire (76443)
127. Mont-Saint-Aignan (76451)
128. Montigny (76446)
129. Montmain (76448)
130. Montville (76452)
131. Morgny-la-Pommeraye (76453)
132. Motteville (76456)
133. Moulineaux (76457)
134. La Neuville-Chant-d'Oisel (76464)
135. Notre-Dame-de-Bliquetuit (76473)
136. Notre-Dame-de-Bondeville (76474)
137. Oissel (76484)
138. Orival (76486)
139. Ouville-l'Abbaye (76491)
140. Pavilly (76495)
141. Petit-Couronne (76497)
142. Le Petit-Quevilly (76498)
143. Pierreval (76502)
144. Pissy-Pôville (76503)
145. Préaux (76509)
146. Prétot-Vicquemare (76510)
147. Quevillon (76513)
148. Quévreville-la-Poterie (76514)
149. Quincampoix (76517)
150. Rebets (76521)
151. Reuville (76524)
152. Rives-en-Seine (76164)
153. Robertot (76530)
154. Rocquefort (76531)
155. Roncherolles-sur-le-Vivier (76536)
156. Rouen (76540)
157. Roumare (76541)
158. Routes (76542)
159. La Rue-Saint-Pierre (76547)
160. Ry (76548)
161. Sahurs (76550)
162. Saint-Aignan-sur-Ry (76554)
163. Saint-André-sur-Cailly (76555)
164. Saint-Arnoult (76557)
165. Saint-Aubin-Celloville (76558)
166. Saint-Aubin-de-Crétot (76559)
167. Saint-Aubin-Épinay (76560)
168. Saint-Aubin-lès-Elbeuf (76561)
169. Saint-Clair-sur-les-Monts (76568)
170. Saint-Denis-le-Thiboult (76573)
171. Sainte-Austreberthe (76566)
172. Sainte-Croix-sur-Buchy (76571)
173. Sainte-Marguerite-sur-Duclair (76608)
174. Sainte-Marie-des-Champs (76610)
175. Saint-Étienne-du-Rouvray (76575)
176. Saint-Georges-sur-Fontaine (76580)
177. Saint-Germain-des-Essourts (76581)
178. Saint-Germain-sous-Cailly (76583)
179. Saint-Gilles-de-Crétot (76585)
180. Saint-Jacques-sur-Darnétal (76591)
181. Saint-Jean-du-Cardonnay (76594)
182. Saint-Laurent-en-Caux (76597)
183. Saint-Léger-du-Bourg-Denis (76599)
184. Saint-Martin-aux-Arbres (76611)
185. Saint-Martin-de-Boscherville (76614)
186. Saint-Martin-de-l'If (76289)
187. Saint-Martin-du-Vivier (76617)
188. Saint-Nicolas-de-la-Haie (76626)
189. Saint-Paër (76631)
190. Saint-Pierre-de-Manneville (76634)
191. Saint-Pierre-de-Varengeville (76636)
192. Saint-Pierre-lès-Elbeuf (76640)
193. Saussay (76668)
194. Servaville-Salmonville (76673)
195. Sierville (76675)
196. Sotteville-lès-Rouen (76681)
197. Sotteville-sous-le-Val (76682)
198. Le Torp-Mesnil (76699)
199. Touffreville-la-Corbeline (76702)
200. Tourville-la-Rivière (76705)
201. Le Trait (76709)
202. Val-de-la-Haye (76717)
203. Valliquerville (76718)
204. Vatteville-la-Rue (76727)
205. La Vaupalière (76728)
206. Vibeuf (76737)
207. Vieux-Manoir (76738)
208. La Vieux-Rue (76740)
209. Villers-Écalles (76743)
210. Yainville (76750)
211. Yerville (76752)
212. Ymare (76753)
213. Yquebeuf (76756)
214. Yvecrique (76757)
215. Yvetot (76758)
216. Yville-sur-Seine (76759)

== History ==
The arrondissement of Rouen was created in 1800. At the January 2017 reorganisation of the arrondissements of Seine-Maritime, it received four communes from the arrondissement of Dieppe and seven communes from the arrondissement of Le Havre, and it lost four communes to the arrondissement of Dieppe.

As a result of the reorganisation of the cantons of France which came into effect in 2015, the borders of the cantons are no longer related to the borders of the arrondissements. The cantons of the arrondissement of Rouen were, as of January 2015:

1. Bois-Guillaume
2. Boos
3. Buchy
4. Caudebec-en-Caux
5. Caudebec-lès-Elbeuf
6. Clères
7. Darnétal
8. Doudeville
9. Duclair
10. Elbeuf
11. Grand-Couronne
12. Le Grand-Quevilly
13. Maromme
14. Mont-Saint-Aignan
15. Notre-Dame-de-Bondeville
16. Pavilly
17. Le Petit-Quevilly
18. Rouen-1
19. Rouen-2
20. Rouen-3
21. Rouen-4
22. Rouen-5
23. Rouen-6
24. Rouen-7
25. Saint-Étienne-du-Rouvray
26. Sotteville-lès-Rouen-Est
27. Sotteville-lès-Rouen-Ouest
28. Yerville
29. Yvetot
