= Bois-d'Ennebourg =

- Commune
- Location of Bois-d'Ennebourg
- Location within France Location within Normandy
- Coordinates: 49°25′46″N 1°15′19″E
- Country: France
- Region: Normandy
- Department: Seine-Maritime
- Arrondissement: Rouen
- Canton: Le Mesnil-Esnard

Government
  - Mayor (2020–2026): Laurent Soler
- Area^{1}: 7.04 km^{2} (2.72 sq mi)
- Elevation: 135 m (443 ft)
- Highest elevation: 160 m (520 ft)
- Lowest elevation: 78 m (256 ft)
- Population (2023): 583
  - Density: 82.8/km^{2} (214/sq mi)
- Time zone: UTC+01:00 (CET)
  - Summer (DST): UTC+02:00 (CEST)
- INSEE/Postal code: 76106 /76160
- Website: Official website
- ^{1} French Land Register data, which excludes lakes, ponds, glaciers > 1 km^{2} (0.386 sq mi or 247 acres) and river estuaries.

Bois-d'Ennebourg (French pronunciation: [bwa dɛnbuʁ]) is a commune in the Seine-Maritime department in the Normandy region in north-western France.

== Geography ==
A farming village situated some 9 miles (14 km) east of Rouen at the junction of the D 491 and the D 53 roads.

== Population ==
Historical population
| Year | Pop. | ±% p.a. |
|---|---|---|
| 1968 | 255 | — |
| 1975 | 323 | +3.43% |
| 1982 | 417 | +3.72% |
| 1990 | 459 | +1.21% |
| 1999 | 511 | +1.20% |
| 2007 | 488 | −0.57% |
| 2012 | 532 | +1.74% |
| 2017 | 563 | +1.14% |
| 2023 | 583 | +0.58% |
Source: INSEE

== Places of interest ==
- The church of St.Martin, dating from the eighteenth century.

== See also ==
- Communes of the Seine-Maritime department
