= La Vieux-Rue =

- Commune
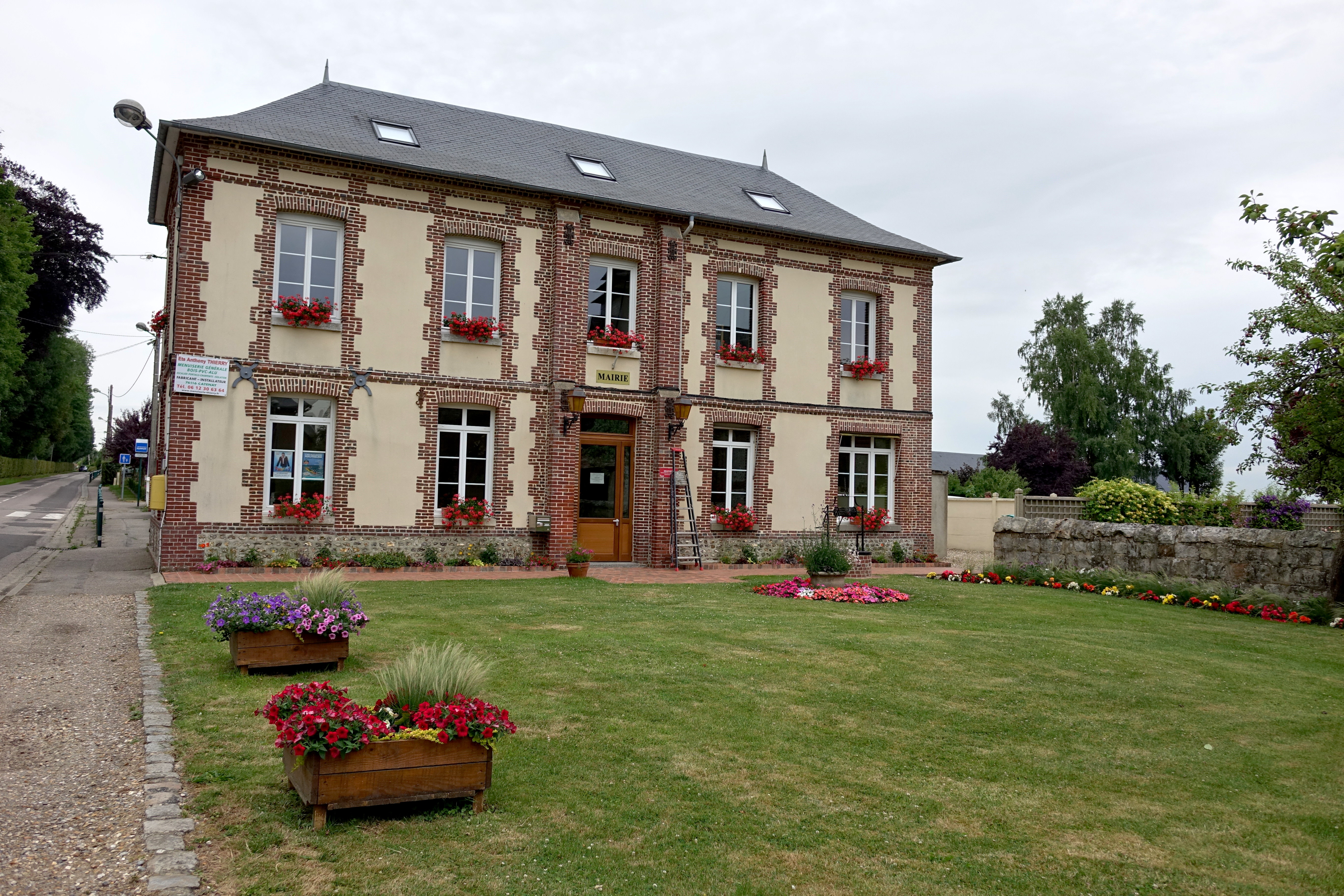
- The town hall in La Vieux-Rue
- Location of La Vieux-Rue
- Location within France Location within Normandy
- Coordinates: 49°29′37″N 1°14′57″E
- Country: France
- Region: Normandy
- Department: Seine-Maritime
- Arrondissement: Rouen
- Canton: Le Mesnil-Esnard

Government
  - Mayor (2026–32): Thierry Vanderpert
- Area^{1}: 5.51 km^{2} (2.13 sq mi)
- Elevation: 164 m (538 ft)
- Highest elevation: 176 m (577 ft)
- Lowest elevation: 124 m (407 ft)
- Population (2023): 572
  - Density: 104/km^{2} (269/sq mi)
- Time zone: UTC+01:00 (CET)
  - Summer (DST): UTC+02:00 (CEST)
- INSEE/Postal code: 76740 /76160
- ^{1} French Land Register data, which excludes lakes, ponds, glaciers > 1 km^{2} (0.386 sq mi or 247 acres) and river estuaries.

La Vieux-Rue (French pronunciation: [la vjø ʁy]) is a commune in the Seine-Maritime department in the Normandy region in northern France.

== Geography ==
La Vieux-Rue (literally, "The Old Street") is a farming village situated some 9 miles (14 km) northeast of Rouen, at the junction of the D15 and the D61 roads.

== Population ==
Historical population
Year	Pop.	±% p.a.
1968	196	—
1975	249	+3.48%
1982	311	+3.23%
1990	374	+2.33%
1999	407	+0.94%
2007	449	+1.24%
2012	522	+3.06%
2017	571	+1.81%
2023	572	+0.03%
Source: INSEE

== Places of interest ==
- The church of St. Martin, dating from the thirteenth century.
- The chateau, dating from the seventeenth century.
- The sixteenth-century manorhouse of Saint-Saire.

== See also ==
- Communes of the Seine-Maritime department
