= Yquebeuf =

- Commune
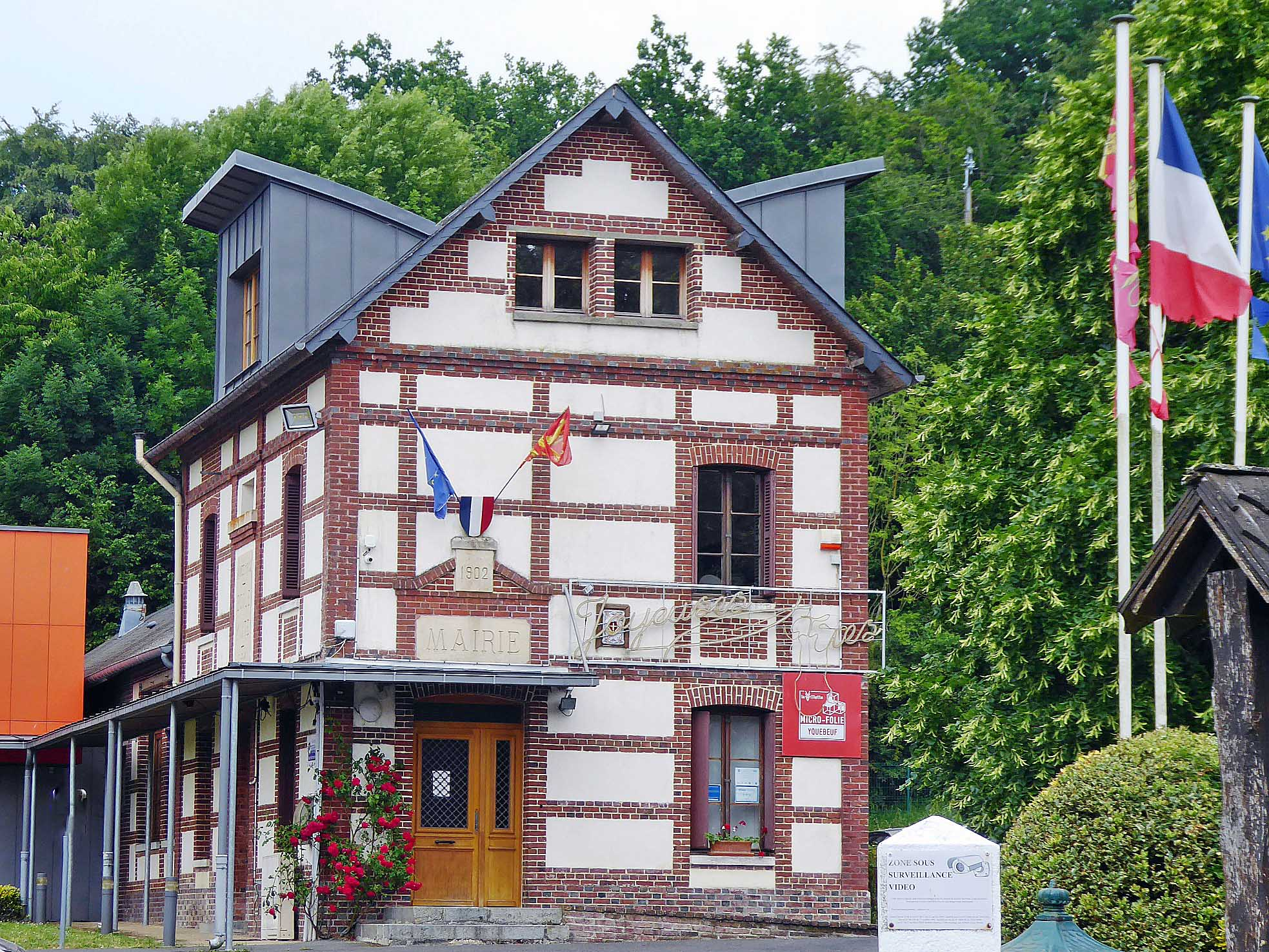
- Yquebeuf Town hall

- Coat of arms
- Location of Yquebeuf
- Location within France Location within Normandy
- Coordinates: 49°35′54″N 1°15′22″E
- Country: France
- Region: Normandy
- Department: Seine-Maritime
- Arrondissement: Rouen
- Canton: Le Mesnil-Esnard
- Intercommunality: Inter-Caux-Vexin

Government
  - Mayor (2026–32): Georges Molmy
- Area^{1}: 6.51 km^{2} (2.51 sq mi)
- Elevation: 160 m (520 ft)
- Highest elevation: 183 m (600 ft)
- Lowest elevation: 126 m (413 ft)
- Population (2023): 235
  - Density: 36.1/km^{2} (93.5/sq mi)
- Time zone: UTC+01:00 (CET)
  - Summer (DST): UTC+02:00 (CEST)
- INSEE/Postal code: 76756 /76690
- ^{1} French Land Register data, which excludes lakes, ponds, glaciers > 1 km^{2} (0.386 sq mi or 247 acres) and river estuaries.

Yquebeuf (French pronunciation: [ikbœf]) is a commune in the Seine-Maritime department in the Normandy region in northern France.

== Toponymy ==
The name comes from Old Norse Eiki-both ("house or village of the oak"), as with many placenames of northern France.

== Geography ==
A small farming village situated in the Pays de Bray, some 15 miles (24 km) northeast of Rouen on the D24. The A28 autoroute passes through the territory of the commune.

== Heraldry ==
Arms of Yquebeuf	The arms of Yquebeuf are blazoned : Gules, a cross fleury argent.

== Population ==
Historical population
Year	Pop.	±% p.a.
1968	119	—
1975	123	+0.47%
1982	180	+5.59%
1990	224	+2.77%
1999	218	−0.30%
2007	242	+1.31%
2012	255	+1.05%
2017	238	−1.37%
2023	235	−0.21%
Source: INSEE

== Places of interest ==
- The church of St. Etienne, dating from the eighteenth century.
- The church of St. Laurent, dating from the seventeenth century.

== See also ==
- Communes of the Seine-Maritime department
