= Canton of Le Mesnil-Esnard =

Coordinates: 49.41°N 1.14°E

- Canton
- Situation of the canton of Le Mesnil-Esnard in the department of Seine-Maritime
- Country: France
- Region: Normandy
- Department: Seine-Maritime
- No. of communes: {{{nbcomm}}}
- Population (2023): 46,633
- INSEE code: 7621

The canton of Le Mesnil-Esnard is an administrative division of the Seine-Maritime department, in northern France. It was created at the French canton reorganisation which came into effect in March 2015. Its seat is in Le Mesnil-Esnard.

It consists of the following communes:

1. Auzouville-sur-Ry
2. Bierville
3. Blainville-Crevon
4. Bois-d'Ennebourg
5. Bois-Guilbert
6. Bois-Héroult
7. Bois-l'Évêque
8. Boissay
9. Boos
10. Bosc-Bordel
11. Bosc-Édeline
12. Buchy
13. Cailly
14. Catenay
15. Elbeuf-sur-Andelle
16. Ernemont-sur-Buchy
17. Franqueville-Saint-Pierre
18. Fresne-le-Plan
19. Grainville-sur-Ry
20. Héronchelles
21. Longuerue
22. Martainville-Épreville
23. Le Mesnil-Esnard
24. Mesnil-Raoul
25. Montmain
26. Morgny-la-Pommeraye
27. La Neuville-Chant-d'Oisel
28. Pierreval
29. Préaux
30. Rebets
31. La Rue-Saint-Pierre
32. Ry
33. Saint-Aignan-sur-Ry
34. Saint-André-sur-Cailly
35. Saint-Denis-le-Thiboult
36. Sainte-Croix-sur-Buchy
37. Saint-Germain-des-Essourts
38. Saint-Germain-sous-Cailly
39. Servaville-Salmonville
40. Vieux-Manoir
41. La Vieux-Rue
42. Yquebeuf
