= Rebets =

- Commune
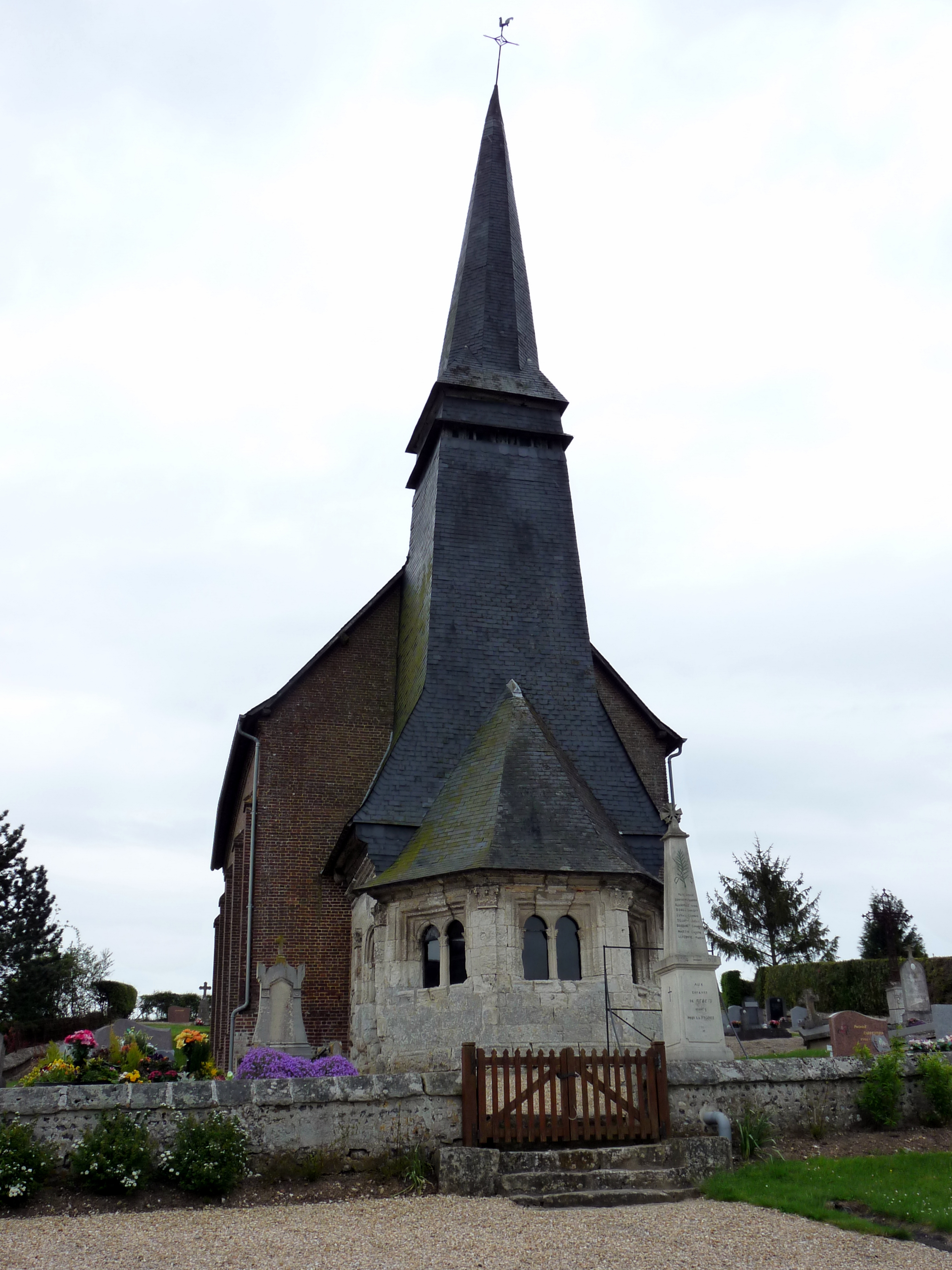
- The church in Rebets
- Location of Rebets
- Location within France Location within Normandy
- Coordinates: 49°30′42″N 1°23′26″E
- Country: France
- Region: Normandy
- Department: Seine-Maritime
- Arrondissement: Rouen
- Canton: Le Mesnil-Esnard

Government
  - Mayor (2026–32): Bernard Corbillon
- Area^{1}: 3.67 km^{2} (1.42 sq mi)
- Elevation: 93 m (305 ft)
- Highest elevation: 176 m (577 ft)
- Lowest elevation: 82 m (269 ft)
- Population (2023): 147
  - Density: 40.1/km^{2} (104/sq mi)
- Time zone: UTC+01:00 (CET)
  - Summer (DST): UTC+02:00 (CEST)
- INSEE/Postal code: 76521 /76750
- ^{1} French Land Register data, which excludes lakes, ponds, glaciers > 1 km^{2} (0.386 sq mi or 247 acres) and river estuaries.

Rebets is a commune in the Seine-Maritime department in the Normandy region in northern France.

== Geography ==
A small farming village situated in the Pays de Bray, some 15 miles (24 km) northeast of Rouen at the junction of the D47 and the D86 roads. The small Héronchelles river, a tributary of the Andelle, flows through the commune.

== Population ==
Historical population
Year	Pop.	±% p.a.
1968	91	—
1975	89	−0.32%
1982	101	+1.82%
1990	108	+0.84%
1999	110	+0.20%
2007	137	+2.78%
2012	142	+0.72%
2017	147	+0.69%
2023	147	+0.00%
Source: INSEE

== Places of interest ==
- The church of St. Denis, dating from the sixteenth century.
- Traces of a feudal castle.

== See also ==
- Communes of the Seine-Maritime department
