= La Neuville-Chant-d'Oisel =

- Commune
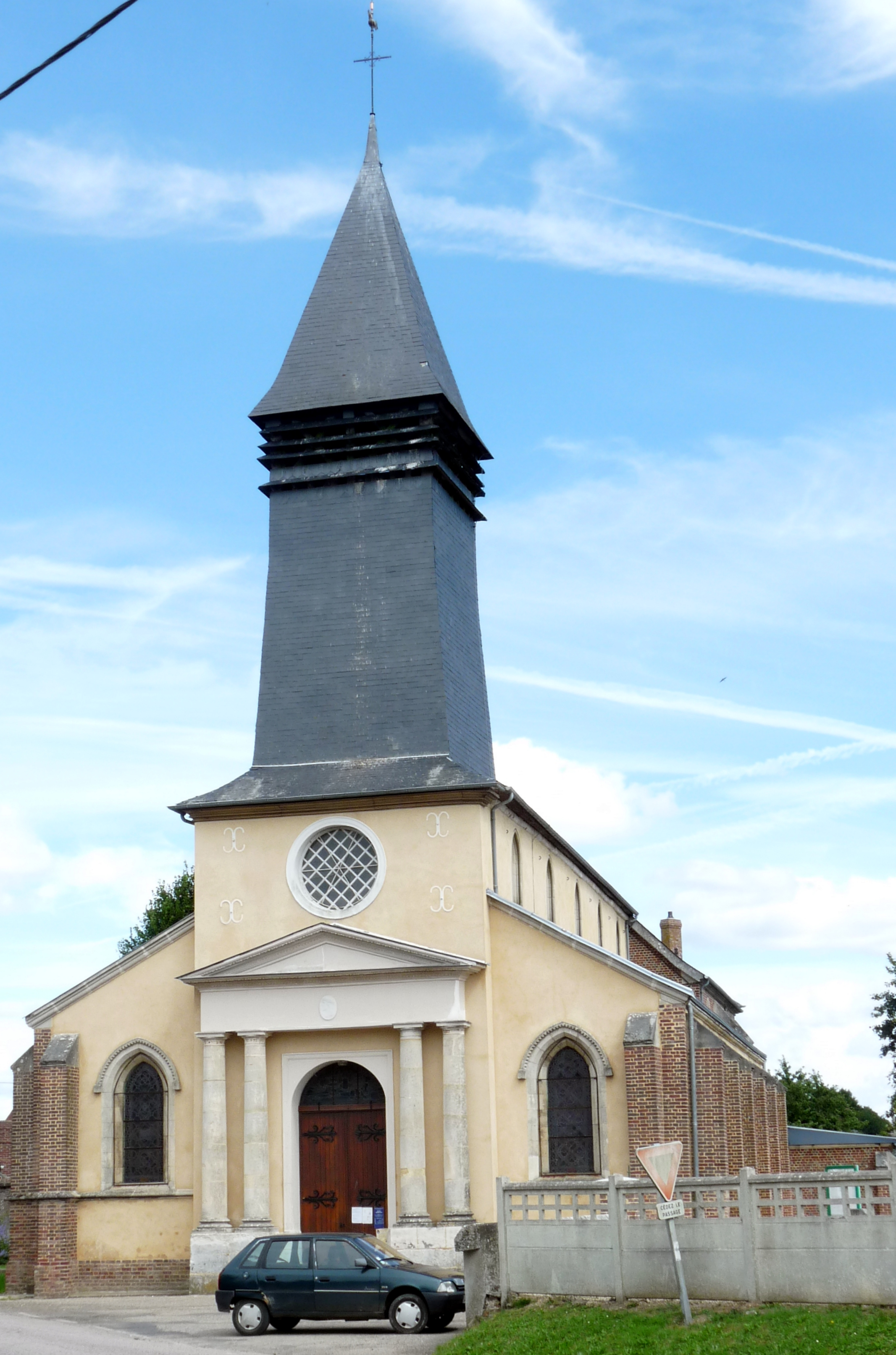
- The church in La Neuville-Chant-d'Oisel
- Location of La Neuville-Chant-d'Oisel
- Location within France Location within Normandy
- Coordinates: 49°22′07″N 1°14′38″E
- Country: France
- Region: Normandy
- Department: Seine-Maritime
- Arrondissement: Rouen
- Canton: Le Mesnil-Esnard
- Intercommunality: Métropole Rouen Normandie

Government
  - Mayor (2026–32): Julien Demazure
- Area^{1}: 21.83 km^{2} (8.43 sq mi)
- Elevation: 168 m (551 ft)
- Highest elevation: 162 m (531 ft)
- Lowest elevation: 74 m (243 ft)
- Population (2023): 2,377
  - Density: 108.9/km^{2} (282.0/sq mi)
- Time zone: UTC+01:00 (CET)
  - Summer (DST): UTC+02:00 (CEST)
- INSEE/Postal code: 76464 /76520
- ^{1} French Land Register data, which excludes lakes, ponds, glaciers > 1 km^{2} (0.386 sq mi or 247 acres) and river estuaries.

La Neuville-Chant-d'Oisel is a commune in the Seine-Maritime department in the Normandy region in north-western France.

== Geography ==
A village of forestry and farming situated some 10 miles (16 km) southeast of Rouen, at the junction of the D 13, D 138 and the D 294 roads. The commune is on the border with the department of Eure.

== Population ==
Historical population

Year	Pop.	±% p.a.
1793	1,447	—
1861	1,306	−0.15%
1921	748	−0.92%
1962	856	+0.33%
1968	896	+0.76%
1975	1,048	+2.26%
1982	1,362	+3.81%

Year	Pop.	±% p.a.
1990	1,691	+2.74%
1999	1,751	+0.39%
2007	1,918	+1.15%
2012	2,228	+3.04%
2017	2,240	+0.11%
2023	2,377	+0.99%

Source: EHESS and INSEE (1968-2023)

== Places of interest ==
- A memorial to cyclist Jacques Anquetil, who lived here.
- The church of Notre-Dame, dating from the thirteenth century.
- The church of St.Austin dating from the sixteenth century at St. Austin.
- Two châteaux, at La Neuville and at Chant-d'Oisel.
- A house once owned by writer Guy de Maupassant and later by cyclist Jacques Anquetil.
- A seventeenth-century stone cross at the cross-roads.

== See also ==
- Communes of the Seine-Maritime department
