= Héronchelles =

- Commune
- Location of Héronchelles
- Location within France Location within Normandy
- Coordinates: 49°31′50″N 1°23′02″E
- Country: France
- Region: Normandy
- Department: Seine-Maritime
- Arrondissement: Rouen
- Canton: Le Mesnil-Esnard

Government
  - Mayor (2026–32): Jean-Luc Poyen
- Area^{1}: 6.71 km^{2} (2.59 sq mi)
- Elevation: 113 m (371 ft)
- Highest elevation: 177 m (581 ft)
- Lowest elevation: 95 m (312 ft)
- Population (2023): 149
  - Density: 22.2/km^{2} (57.5/sq mi)
- Time zone: UTC+01:00 (CET)
  - Summer (DST): UTC+02:00 (CEST)
- INSEE/Postal code: 76359 /76750
- ^{1} French Land Register data, which excludes lakes, ponds, glaciers > 1 km^{2} (0.386 sq mi or 247 acres) and river estuaries.

Héronchelles (French pronunciation: [eʁɔ̃ʃɛl]) is a commune in the Seine-Maritime department in the Normandy region in northern France.

== Geography ==
A very small farming village, source of the tiny river Héronchelles, situated some 16 miles (26 km) northeast of Rouen, at the junction of the D46, D261 and the D290 roads.

== Population ==
Historical population
Year	Pop.	±% p.a.
1968	88	—
1975	102	+2.13%
1982	91	−1.62%
1990	102	+1.44%
1999	89	−1.50%
2007	110	+2.68%
2012	126	+2.75%
2017	139	+1.98%
2023	149	+1.16%
Source: INSEE

== Places of interest ==
- The church of St. Geneviève and St. Nicolas, dating from the seventeenth century.
- Ruins of a feudal castle.
- A sixteenth-century chateau.
- A dovecote.
- A manor.

== Leisure facilities ==
- A large picnic area.
- A playground.
- Petanque.
- A village hall.

== See also ==
- Communes of the Seine-Maritime department
