= Mesnil-Raoul =

- Commune
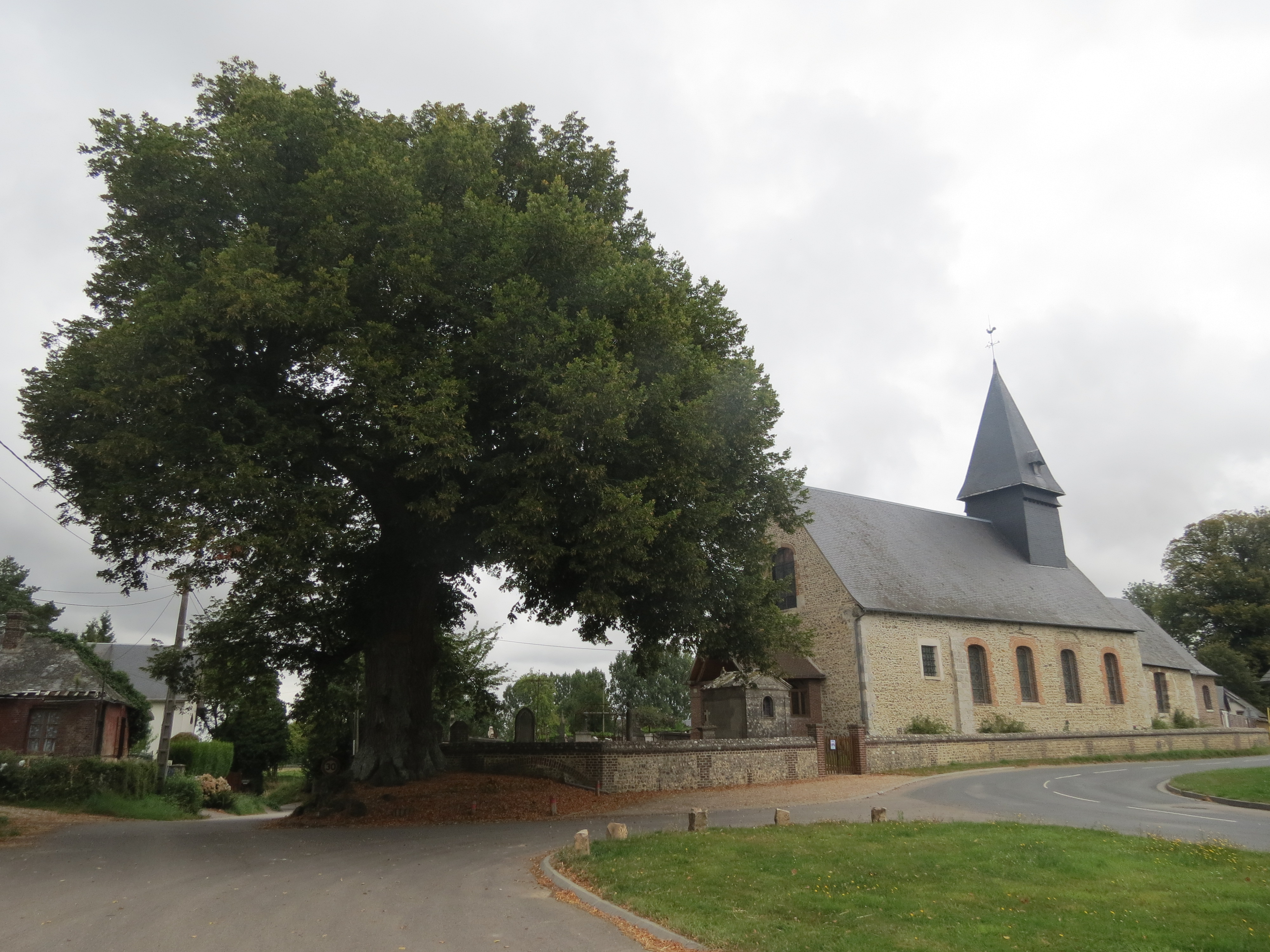
- The church in Mesnil-Raoul

- Coat of arms
- Location of Mesnil-Raoul
- Location within France Location within Normandy
- Coordinates: 49°23′51″N 1°16′31″E
- Country: France
- Region: Normandy
- Department: Seine-Maritime
- Arrondissement: Rouen
- Canton: Le Mesnil-Esnard

Government
  - Mayor (2026–32): Emmanuel Gosse
- Area^{1}: 6.76 km^{2} (2.61 sq mi)
- Elevation: 150 m (490 ft)
- Highest elevation: 162 m (531 ft)
- Lowest elevation: 126 m (413 ft)
- Population (2023): 1,245
  - Density: 184/km^{2} (477/sq mi)
- Time zone: UTC+01:00 (CET)
  - Summer (DST): UTC+02:00 (CEST)
- INSEE/Postal code: 76434 /76520
- ^{1} French Land Register data, which excludes lakes, ponds, glaciers > 1 km^{2} (0.386 sq mi or 247 acres) and river estuaries.

Mesnil-Raoul is a commune in the Seine-Maritime department in the Normandy region in northern France.

== Geography ==
A farming village, situated by the border with the department of Eure, some 12 miles (19 km) southeast of Rouen at the junction of the D13, D294 and the D6014 roads.

== Population ==
Historical population
Year	Pop.	±% p.a.
1968	353	—
1975	400	+1.80%
1982	475	+2.49%
1990	689	+4.76%
1999	725	+0.57%
2007	835	+1.78%
2012	895	+1.40%
2017	1,024	+2.73%
2023	1,245	+3.31%
Source: INSEE

== Places of interest ==
- The church of St.Jean, dating from the eleventh century.
- The museum of music.

== See also ==
- Communes of the Seine-Maritime department
