= Les Authieux-sur-le-Port-Saint-Ouen =

- Commune
- Location of Les Authieux-sur-le-Port-Saint-Ouen
- Location within France Location within Normandy
- Coordinates: 49°20′28″N 1°08′04″E
- Country: France
- Region: Normandy
- Department: Seine-Maritime
- Arrondissement: Rouen
- Canton: Darnétal
- Intercommunality: Métropole Rouen Normandie

Government
  - Mayor (2020–2026): Marc Duflos
- Area^{1}: 4.53 km^{2} (1.75 sq mi)
- Elevation: 75 m (246 ft)
- Highest elevation: 86 m (282 ft)
- Lowest elevation: 2 m (6.6 ft)
- Population (2023): 1,190
  - Density: 263/km^{2} (680/sq mi)
- Time zone: UTC+01:00 (CET)
  - Summer (DST): UTC+02:00 (CEST)
- INSEE/Postal code: 76039 /76520
- ^{1} French Land Register data, which excludes lakes, ponds, glaciers > 1 km^{2} (0.386 sq mi or 247 acres) and river estuaries.

Les Authieux-sur-le-Port-Saint-Ouen (French pronunciation: [lez‿otjø syʁ lə pɔʁ sɛ̃t‿wɛ̃]) is a commune in the Seine-Maritime department in the Normandy region in northern France.

== Geography ==
A farming and forestry village situated by the banks of the river Seine, some 7 miles (11 km) south of Rouen, at the junction of the D7, D13 and the D91 roads.

== Population ==
Historical population
Year	Pop.	±% p.a.
1968	423	—
1975	509	+2.68%
1982	652	+3.60%
1990	954	+4.87%
1999	1,174	+2.33%
2007	1,216	+0.44%
2012	1,213	−0.05%
2017	1,265	+0.84%
2023	1,190	−1.01%
Source: INSEE

== Places of interest ==
- The church of St.Saturnin, dating from the thirteenth century.
- A 300m long cave in a hillside.

== See also ==
- Communes of the Seine-Maritime department
