= Boissay =

- Commune
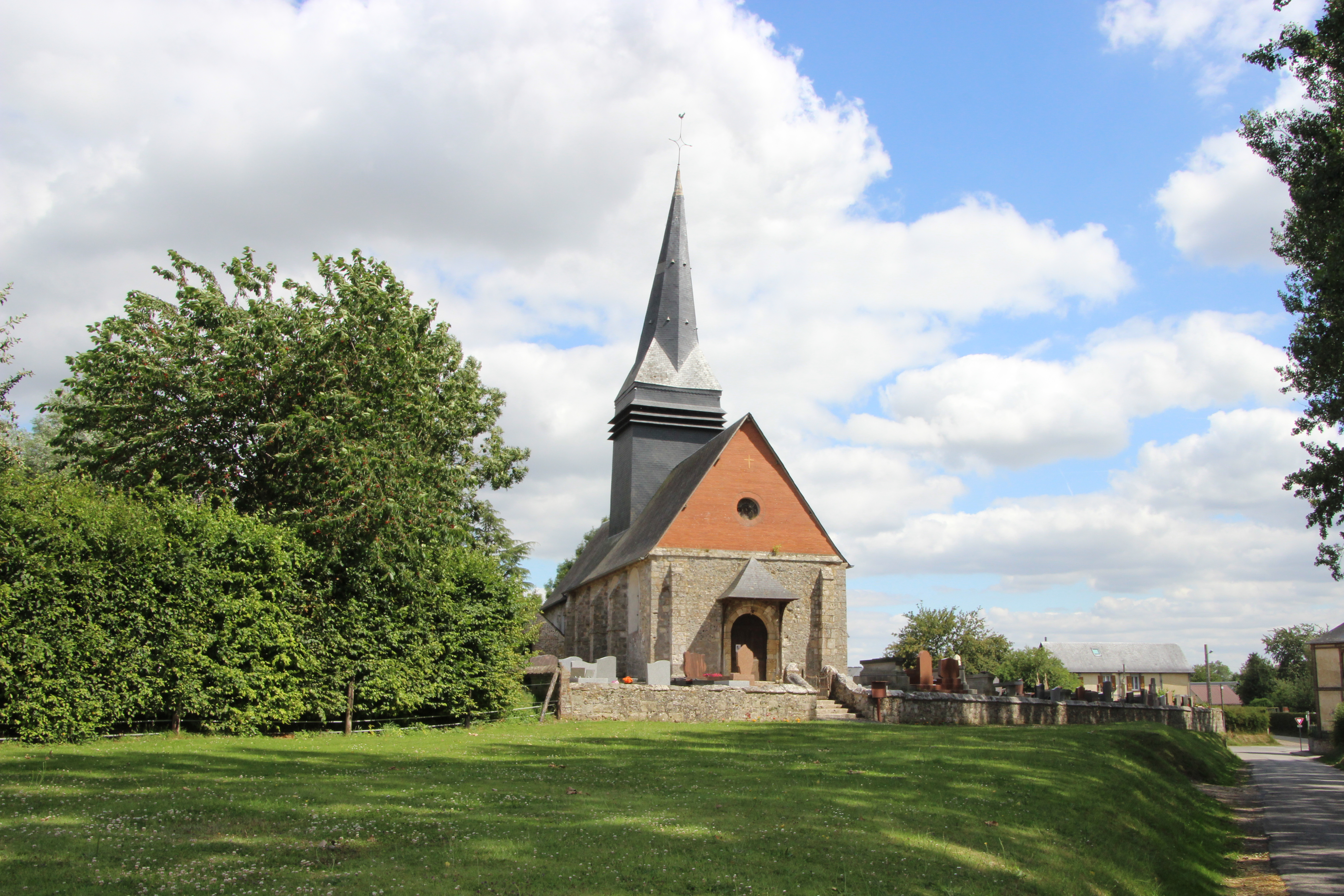
- The Église Saint-Martin in Boissay
- Location of Boissay
- Location within France Location within Normandy
- Coordinates: 49°31′12″N 1°21′30″E
- Country: France
- Region: Normandy
- Department: Seine-Maritime
- Arrondissement: Rouen
- Canton: Le Mesnil-Esnard

Government
  - Mayor (2026–32): Delphine Duramé
- Area^{1}: 6.63 km^{2} (2.56 sq mi)
- Elevation: 150 m (490 ft)
- Highest elevation: 171 m (561 ft)
- Lowest elevation: 114 m (374 ft)
- Population (2023): 429
  - Density: 64.7/km^{2} (168/sq mi)
- Time zone: UTC+01:00 (CET)
  - Summer (DST): UTC+02:00 (CEST)
- INSEE/Postal code: 76113 /76750
- ^{1} French Land Register data, which excludes lakes, ponds, glaciers > 1 km^{2} (0.386 sq mi or 247 acres) and river estuaries.

Boissay (French pronunciation: [bwasɛ]) is a commune in the Seine-Maritime department in the Normandy region in north-western France. It is the place of origin of the Boissay family.

== Geography ==
It is a farming village situated in the Pays de Bray some 14 miles (23 km) northeast of Rouen at the junction of the D87, D93 and the D261 roads.

== Population ==
Historical population
Year	Pop.	±% p.a.
1968	199	—
1975	203	+0.28%
1982	213	+0.69%
1990	241	+1.56%
1999	268	+1.19%
2007	291	+1.03%
2012	354	+4.00%
2017	406	+2.78%
2023	429	+0.92%
Source: INSEE

== Places of interest ==
- The Église Saint-Martin, dating from the seventeenth century.
- An eighteenth-century dovecote.

== See also ==
- Communes of the Seine-Maritime department
