= Bierville =

- Commune
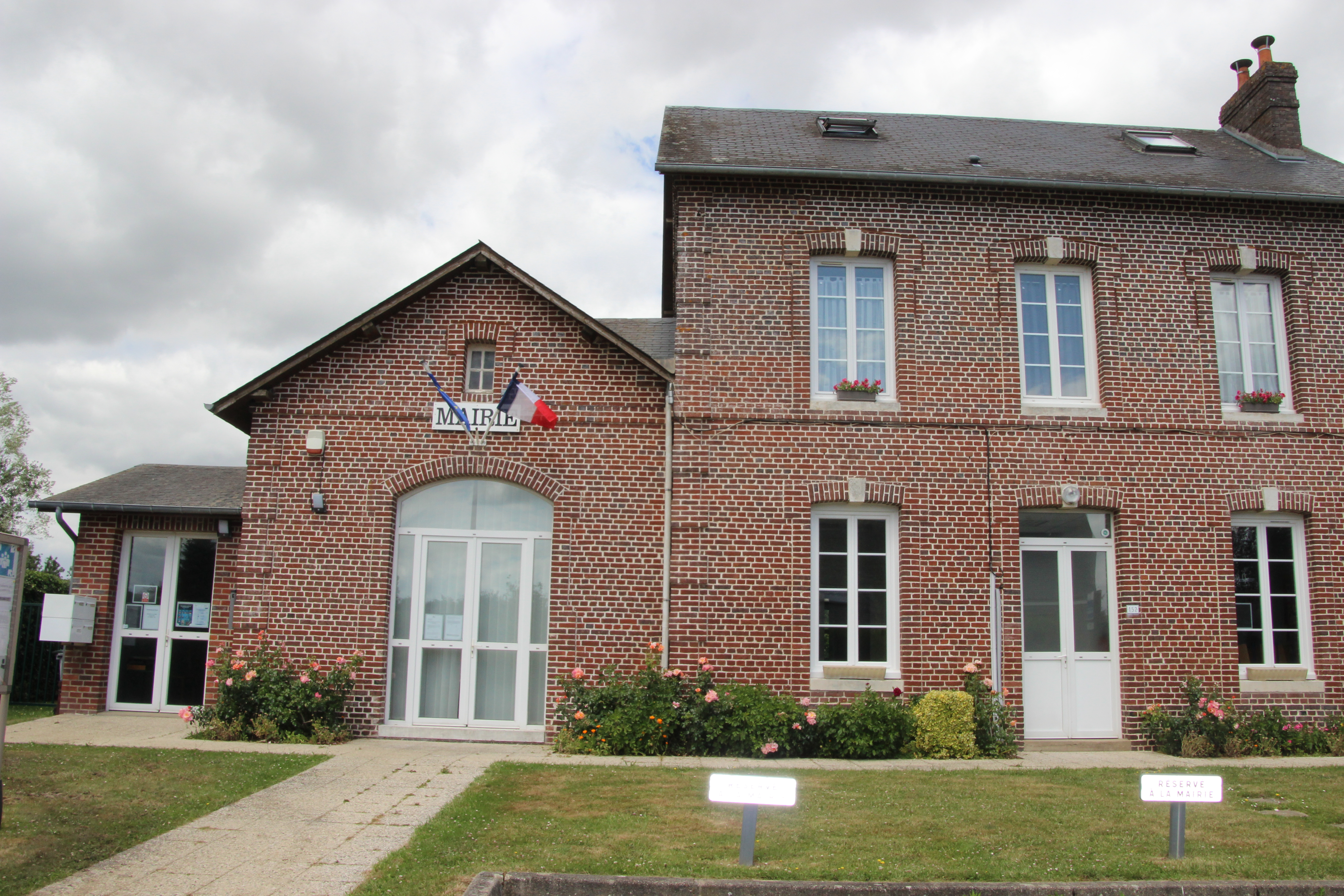
- Bierville Town hall
- Location of Bierville
- Location within France Location within Normandy
- Coordinates: 49°32′24″N 1°16′27″E
- Country: France
- Region: Normandy
- Department: Seine-Maritime
- Arrondissement: Rouen
- Canton: Le Mesnil-Esnard

Government
  - Mayor (2026–32): Jean-Jacques Boutet
- Area^{1}: 2.22 km^{2} (0.86 sq mi)
- Elevation: 160 m (520 ft)
- Highest elevation: 173 m (568 ft)
- Lowest elevation: 118 m (387 ft)
- Population (2023): 315
  - Density: 142/km^{2} (367/sq mi)
- Time zone: UTC+01:00 (CET)
  - Summer (DST): UTC+02:00 (CEST)
- INSEE/Postal code: 76094 /76750
- ^{1} French Land Register data, which excludes lakes, ponds, glaciers > 1 km^{2} (0.386 sq mi or 247 acres) and river estuaries.

Bierville is a commune in the Seine-Maritime department in the Normandy region in northern France.

== Geography ==
A small farming village situated in the Pays de Bray some 10 miles (16 km) northeast of Rouen, at the junction of the D90 and the D213 roads.

== Population ==
Historical population
Year	Pop.	±% p.a.
1968	90	—
1975	132	+5.62%
1982	181	+4.61%
1990	250	+4.12%
1999	259	+0.39%
2007	270	+0.52%
2012	286	+1.16%
2017	317	+2.08%
2023	315	−0.11%
Source: INSEE

== Places of interest ==
- The church of St.Peter & Paul, dating from the eighteenth century.
- A nineteenth-century chateau.
- A seventeenth-century stone cross.

== See also ==
- Communes of the Seine-Maritime department
