= Franqueville-Saint-Pierre =

- Commune
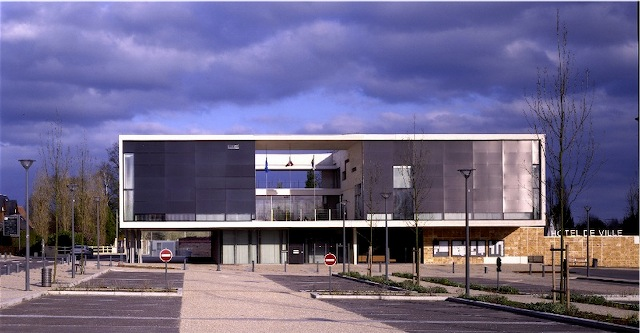
- Town hall

- Coat of arms
- Location of Franqueville-Saint-Pierre
- Location within France Location within Normandy
- Coordinates: 49°24′04″N 1°10′48″E
- Country: France
- Region: Normandy
- Department: Seine-Maritime
- Arrondissement: Rouen
- Canton: Le Mesnil-Esnard
- Intercommunality: Métropole Rouen Normandie

Government
  - Mayor (2026–32): Bruno Guilbert
- Area^{1}: 8.56 km^{2} (3.31 sq mi)
- Elevation: 140 m (460 ft)
- Highest elevation: 162 m (531 ft)
- Lowest elevation: 75 m (246 ft)
- Population (2023): 6,171
  - Density: 721/km^{2} (1,870/sq mi)
- Time zone: UTC+01:00 (CET)
  - Summer (DST): UTC+02:00 (CEST)
- INSEE/Postal code: 76475 /76520
- ^{1} French Land Register data, which excludes lakes, ponds, glaciers > 1 km^{2} (0.386 sq mi or 247 acres) and river estuaries.

Franqueville-Saint-Pierre (French pronunciation: [fʁɑ̃kvil sɛ̃ pjɛʁ]) is a commune in the Seine-Maritime department in the Normandy region in northern France. It was created in 1970 by the merger of two former communes: Notre-Dame-de-Franqueville and Saint-Pierre-de-Franqueville.

== Geography ==
A small light industrial and farming town situated some 5 miles (8.0 km) southeast of the centre of Rouen, at the junction of the D7, D138 and the D6014 roads.

== Heraldry ==
Arms of Franqueville-Saint-Pierre	The arms of Franqueville-Saint-Pierre are blazoned : Azure, a chevron between 2 cocks respectant Or, a tower argent.

== Population ==
Population data refer to the area corresponding with the commune as of January 2025.

Historical population
Year	Pop.	±% p.a.
1968	1,888	—
1975	2,320	+2.99%
1982	3,551	+6.27%
1990	4,230	+2.21%
1999	5,099	+2.10%
2007	5,483	+0.91%
2012	6,119	+2.22%
2017	6,123	+0.01%
2023	6,171	+0.13%
Source: INSEE

== Places of interest ==
- The twentieth century Hôtel de Ville (town hall), built by Richard + Schoeller.
- The church of St.Pierre, dating from the seventeenth century.
- The church of Notre-Dame, dating from the eleventh century.
- A seventeenth-century chateau, built in brick.

== See also ==
- Communes of the Seine-Maritime department
