= Saint-Germain-des-Essourts =

- Commune
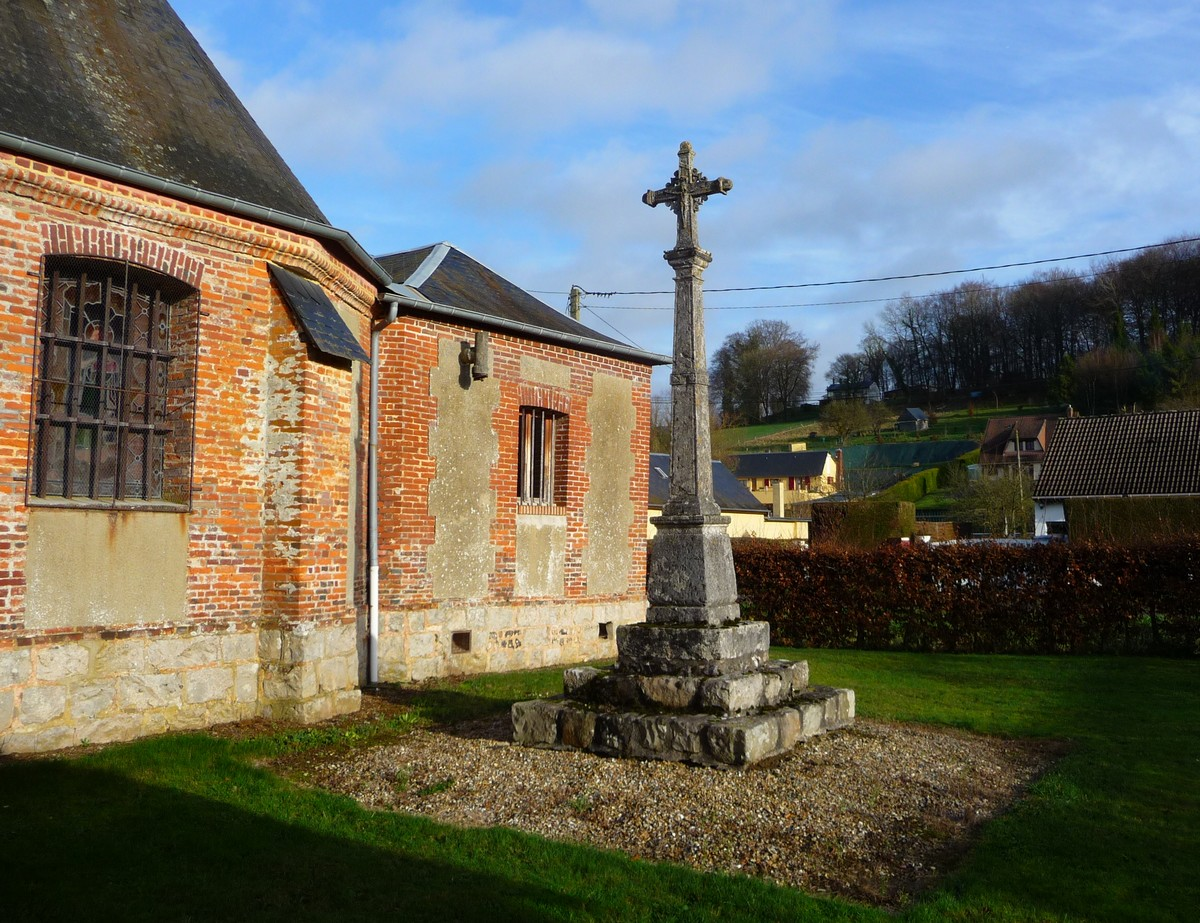
- The cemetery cross in Saint-Germain-des-Essourts
- Location of Saint-Germain-des-Essourts
- Location within France Location within Normandy
- Coordinates: 49°32′22″N 1°19′14″E
- Country: France
- Region: Normandy
- Department: Seine-Maritime
- Arrondissement: Rouen
- Canton: Le Mesnil-Esnard

Government
  - Mayor (2026–32): Alain Burette
- Area^{1}: 9.37 km^{2} (3.62 sq mi)
- Elevation: 128 m (420 ft)
- Highest elevation: 171 m (561 ft)
- Lowest elevation: 101 m (331 ft)
- Population (2023): 380
  - Density: 41/km^{2} (110/sq mi)
- Time zone: UTC+01:00 (CET)
  - Summer (DST): UTC+02:00 (CEST)
- INSEE/Postal code: 76581 /76750
- ^{1} French Land Register data, which excludes lakes, ponds, glaciers > 1 km^{2} (0.386 sq mi or 247 acres) and river estuaries.

Saint-Germain-des-Essourts (French pronunciation: [sɛ̃ ʒɛʁmɛ̃ dez‿esuʁ]) is a commune in the Seine-Maritime department in the Normandy region in northern France.

== Geography ==
A farming village situated in the Pays de Bray, some 14 miles (23 km) northeast of Rouen at the junction of the D98 with the D87 and the D7 with the D61 roads. The commune's territory is the source of the river Crevon, a small tributary of the Andelle river.

== Population ==
Historical population
Year	Pop.	±% p.a.
1968	245	—
1975	247	+0.12%
1982	247	+0.00%
1990	329	+3.65%
1999	352	+0.75%
2007	363	+0.39%
2012	400	+1.96%
2017	406	+0.30%
2023	380	−1.10%
Source: INSEE

== Places of interest ==
- The church of St. Germain, dating from the nineteenth century.
- A sixteenth-century stone cross.
- The nineteenth-century chateau of Fontaine-Châtel.
- The chateau of Bimare.
- The chapel of St. Austreberthe.

== See also ==
- Communes of the Seine-Maritime department
