= Saint-André-sur-Cailly =

- Commune
- Coat of arms
- Location of Saint-André-sur-Cailly
- Location within France Location within Normandy
- Coordinates: 49°32′57″N 1°13′14″E
- Country: France
- Region: Normandy
- Department: Seine-Maritime
- Arrondissement: Rouen
- Canton: Le Mesnil-Esnard
- Intercommunality: CC Inter-Caux-Vexin

Government
  - Mayor (2026–32): Eric Avenel
- Area^{1}: 12.28 km^{2} (4.74 sq mi)
- Elevation: 170 m (560 ft)
- Highest elevation: 176 m (577 ft)
- Lowest elevation: 114 m (374 ft)
- Population (2023): 789
  - Density: 64.3/km^{2} (166/sq mi)
- Time zone: UTC+01:00 (CET)
  - Summer (DST): UTC+02:00 (CEST)
- INSEE/Postal code: 76555 /76690
- Website: www.saintandresurcailly.fr
- ^{1} French Land Register data, which excludes lakes, ponds, glaciers > 1 km^{2} (0.386 sq mi or 247 acres) and river estuaries.

Saint-André-sur-Cailly (French pronunciation: [sɛ̃.t‿ɑ̃dʁe syʁ kaji], literally Saint-André on Cailly) is a commune in the Seine-Maritime department in the Normandy region in northern France.

== Geography ==
A farming village situated in the valley of the Cailly, some 12 miles (19 km) northeast of Rouen at the junction of the D12, D87 and the D928 roads. The A28 autoroute runs through the commune's territory.

== Population ==
Historical population
Year	Pop.	±% p.a.
1968	405	—
1975	524	+3.75%
1982	583	+1.54%
1990	636	+1.09%
1999	821	+2.88%
2007	847	+0.39%
2012	877	+0.70%
2017	857	−0.46%
2023	789	−1.37%
Source: INSEE

== Places of interest ==
- The church of St. André, dating from the eleventh century.
- The ruins of a Roman amphitheatre at the hamlet of Bout Levé.
- Three châteaux.
- A sixteenth-century stone cross in the cemetery.

== See also ==
- Communes of the Seine-Maritime department
