= Canton of Sotteville-lès-Rouen-Ouest =

Coordinates: 49.4167°N 1.1000°E

Sotteville-lès-Rouen-Ouest
- Former canton
- Interactive map of Sotteville-lès-Rouen-Ouest
- Country: France
- Region: Normandy
- Department: Seine-Maritime
- No. of communes: {{{nbcomm}}}
- Disbanded: 2015
- Population (2012): 19,790

The Canton of Sotteville-lès-Rouen-Ouest is a former canton situated in the Seine-Maritime département and in the Haute-Normandie region of northern France. It was disbanded following the French canton reorganisation which came into effect in March 2015. It consisted of part of the commune of Sotteville-lès-Rouen and had a total of 19,790 inhabitants (2012).

== Geography ==
A light industrial area, situated on the left bank of the Seine immediately next to Rouen.

== See also ==
- Arrondissements of the Seine-Maritime department
- Cantons of the Seine-Maritime department
- Communes of the Seine-Maritime department
