= Bois-Guilbert =

- Commune
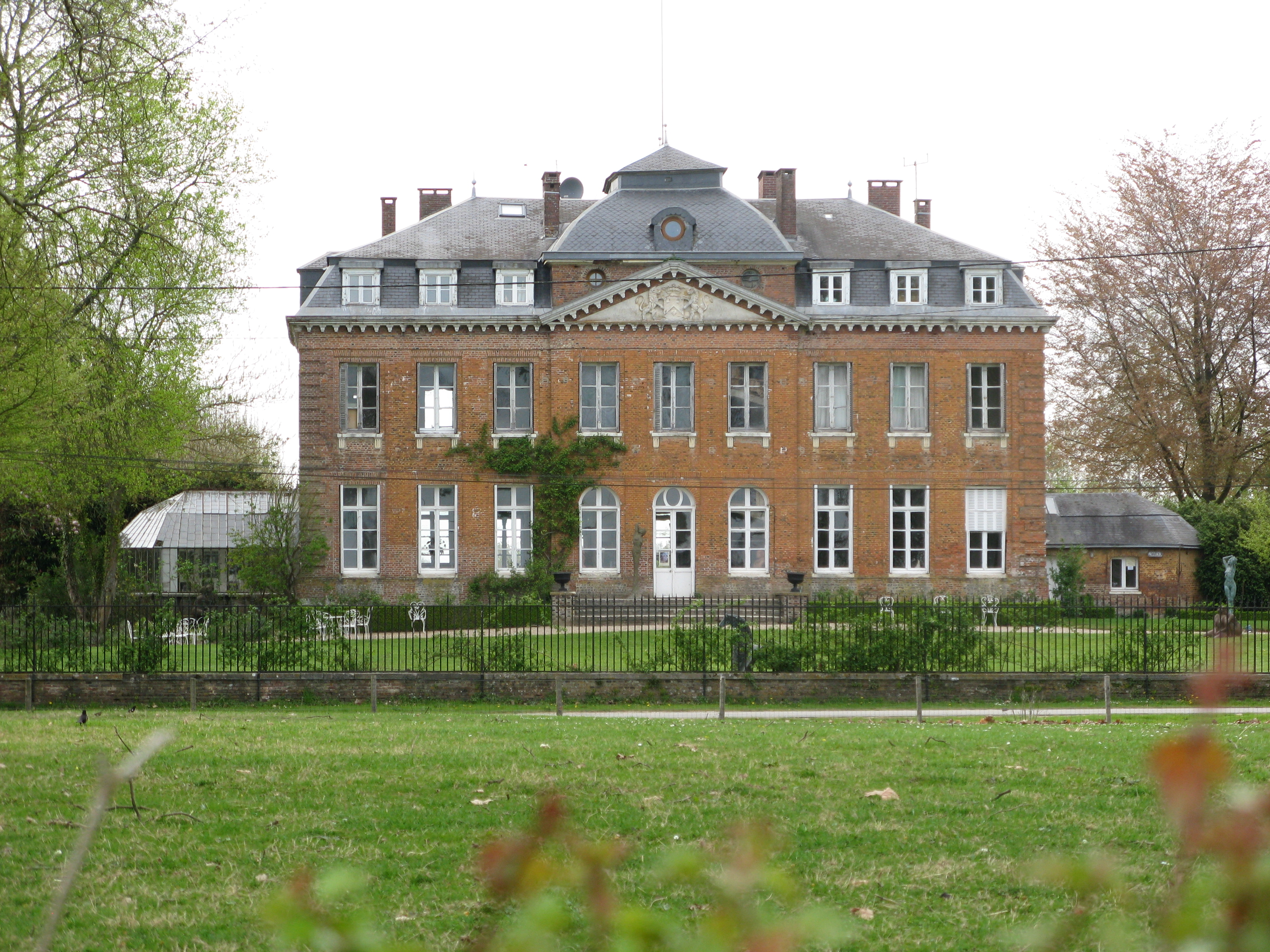
- The chateau of Bois-Guilbert
- Location of Bois-Guilbert
- Location within France Location within Normandy
- Coordinates: 49°32′52″N 1°24′58″E
- Country: France
- Region: Normandy
- Department: Seine-Maritime
- Arrondissement: Rouen
- Canton: Le Mesnil-Esnard

Government
  - Mayor (2020–2026): Bruno Boucher
- Area^{1}: 8.13 km^{2} (3.14 sq mi)
- Elevation: 190 m (620 ft)
- Highest elevation: 226 m (741 ft)
- Lowest elevation: 115 m (377 ft)
- Population (2023): 289
  - Density: 35.5/km^{2} (92.1/sq mi)
- Time zone: UTC+01:00 (CET)
  - Summer (DST): UTC+02:00 (CEST)
- INSEE/Postal code: 76107 /76750
- ^{1} French Land Register data, which excludes lakes, ponds, glaciers > 1 km^{2} (0.386 sq mi or 247 acres) and river estuaries.

Bois-Guilbert (French pronunciation: [bwa ɡilbɛʁ]) is a commune in the Seine-Maritime department in the Normandy region in north-western France.

== Geography ==
A small farming village situated in the Pays de Bray, some 19 miles (31 km) northeast of Rouen, at the junction of the D41 and the D261 roads.

== Population ==
Historical population
Year	Pop.	±% p.a.
1968	215	—
1975	187	−1.97%
1982	166	−1.69%
1990	172	+0.44%
1999	185	+0.81%
2007	227	+2.59%
2012	289	+4.95%
2017	315	+1.74%
2023	289	−1.43%
Source: INSEE

== Places of interest ==
- The church of St.Pierre, dating from the sixteenth century.
- Two châteaux.

== People linked with the commune ==
- Pierre de Boisguilbert (1645–1714), an economist.

== See also ==
- Communes of the Seine-Maritime department
