= Montmain, Seine-Maritime =

Montmain
- Commune
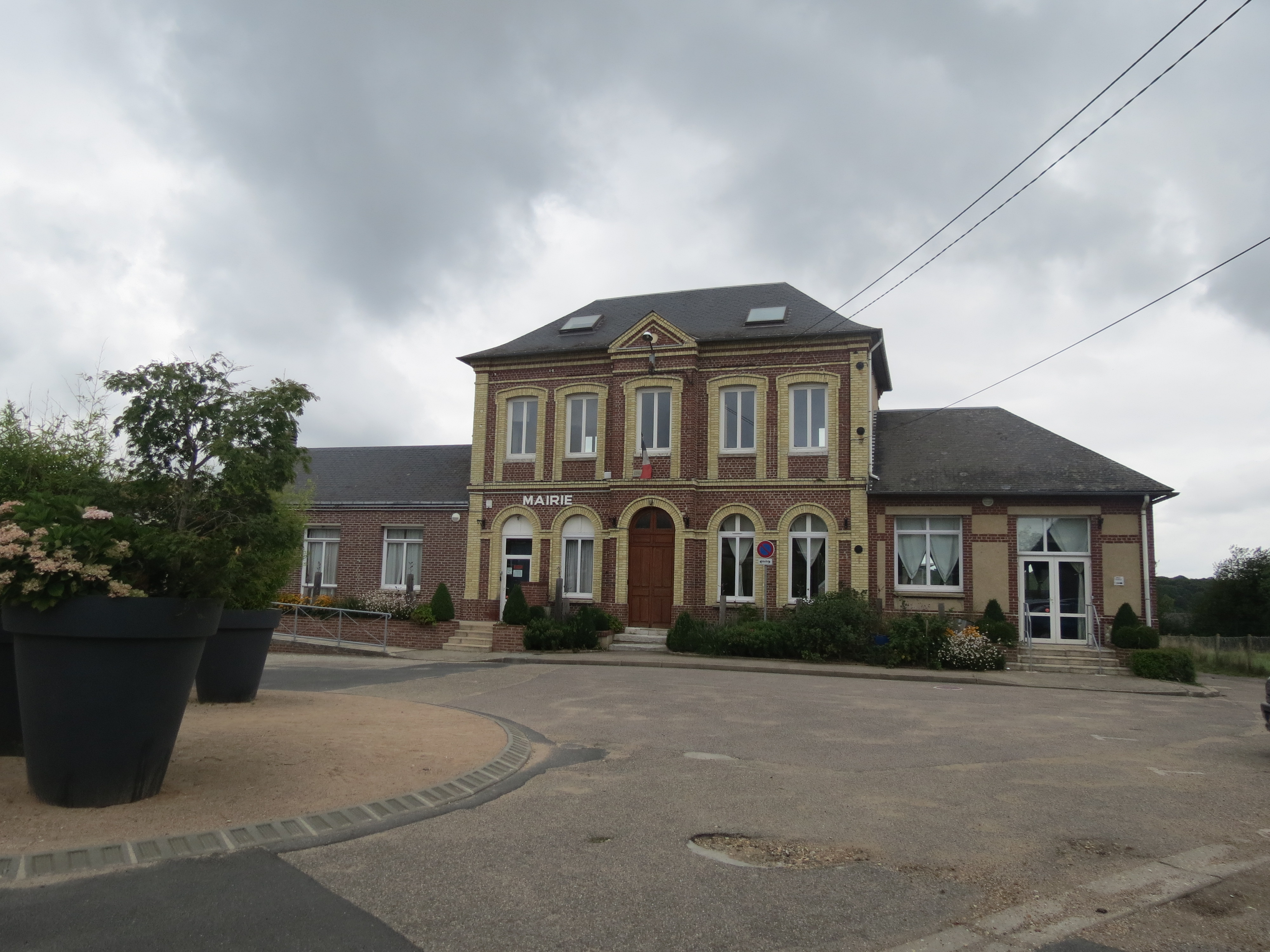
- The town hall in Montmain
- Location of Montmain
- Location within France Location within Normandy
- Coordinates: 49°24′36″N 1°14′20″E
- Country: France
- Region: Normandy
- Department: Seine-Maritime
- Arrondissement: Rouen
- Canton: Le Mesnil-Esnard
- Intercommunality: Métropole Rouen Normandie

Government
  - Mayor (2026–32): Aymeric Baudel
- Area^{1}: 6.04 km^{2} (2.33 sq mi)
- Elevation: 150 m (490 ft)
- Highest elevation: 159 m (522 ft)
- Lowest elevation: 67 m (220 ft)
- Population (2023): 1,500
  - Density: 250/km^{2} (640/sq mi)
- Time zone: UTC+01:00 (CET)
  - Summer (DST): UTC+02:00 (CEST)
- INSEE/Postal code: 76448 /76520
- ^{1} French Land Register data, which excludes lakes, ponds, glaciers > 1 km^{2} (0.386 sq mi or 247 acres) and river estuaries.

Montmain (French pronunciation: [mɔ̃mɛ̃]) is a commune in the Seine-Maritime department in the Normandy region in north-western France.

== Geography ==
Montmain is a village of forestry and farming, 7 miles (11 km) southeast of Rouen, at the junction of the D 42 and the D 491 roads.

== Population ==
Historical population
Year	Pop.	±% p.a.
1968	310	—
1975	611	+10.18%
1982	710	+2.17%
1990	1,048	+4.99%
1999	1,416	+3.40%
2007	1,335	−0.73%
2012	1,388	+0.78%
2017	1,314	−1.09%
2023	1,500	+2.23%
Source: INSEE

== Places of interest ==
- The church of St.Nicolas, dating from the eighteenth century.
- Some ruined feudal walls and terracing.

== See also ==
- Communes of the Seine-Maritime department
