= Fresne-le-Plan =

- Commune
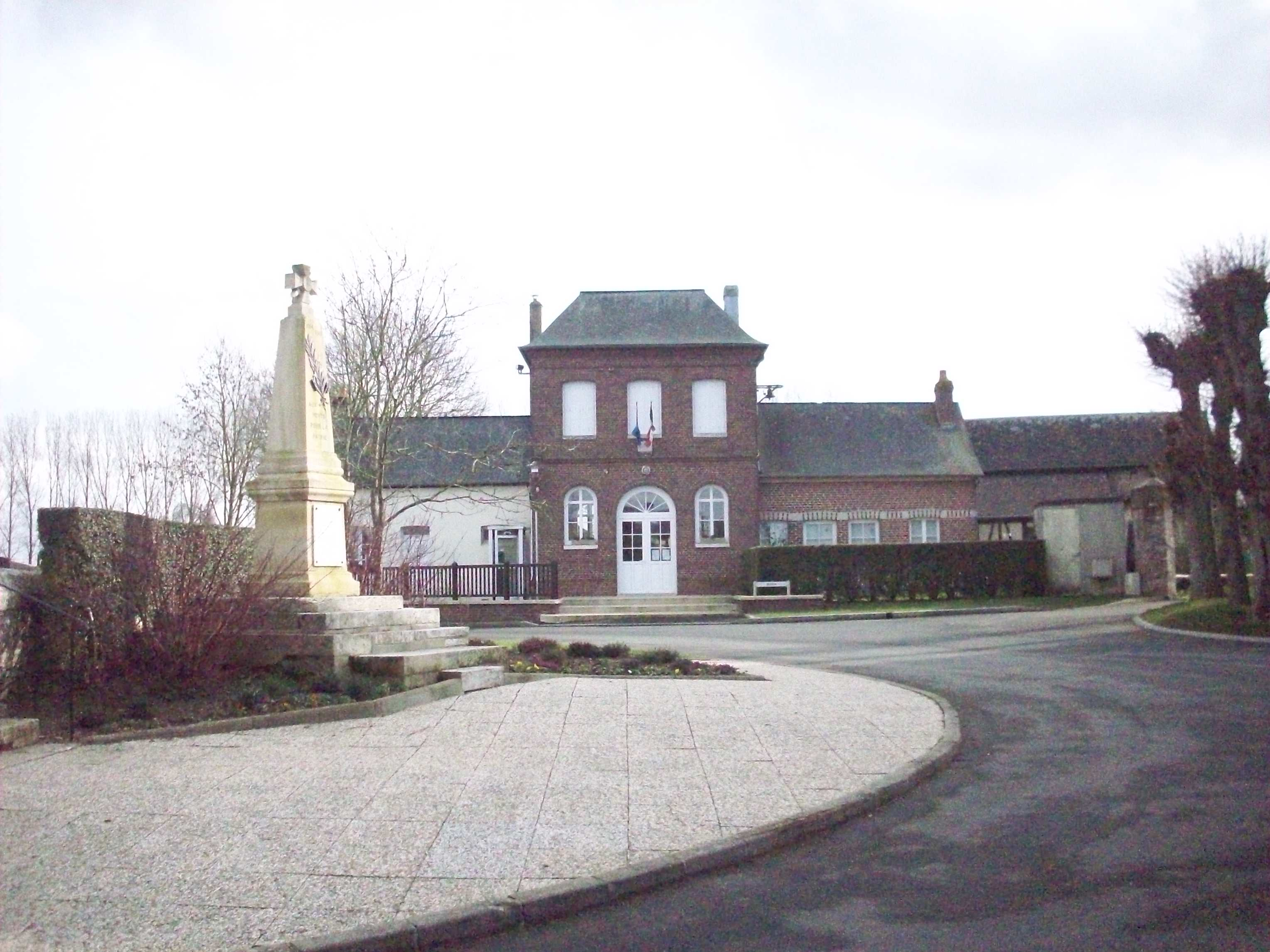
- The town hall in Fresne-le-Plan
- Location of Fresne-le-Plan
- Location within France Location within Normandy
- Coordinates: 49°24′48″N 1°17′45″E
- Country: France
- Region: Normandy
- Department: Seine-Maritime
- Arrondissement: Rouen
- Canton: Le Mesnil-Esnard

Government
  - Mayor (2026–32): Guillaume Renard
- Area^{1}: 6.88 km^{2} (2.66 sq mi)
- Elevation: 155 m (509 ft)
- Highest elevation: 161 m (528 ft)
- Lowest elevation: 125 m (410 ft)
- Population (2023): 554
  - Density: 80.5/km^{2} (209/sq mi)
- Time zone: UTC+01:00 (CET)
  - Summer (DST): UTC+02:00 (CEST)
- INSEE/Postal code: 76285 /76520
- ^{1} French Land Register data, which excludes lakes, ponds, glaciers > 1 km^{2} (0.386 sq mi or 247 acres) and river estuaries.

Fresne-le-Plan (French pronunciation: [fʁɛn lə plɑ̃]) is a commune in the Seine-Maritime department in the Normandy region in north-western France.

== Geography ==
A farming village situated on the border with the department of Eure, some 11 miles (18 km) east of Rouen, at the junction of the D 13 and the D 42 roads.

== Population ==
Historical population
Year	Pop.	±% p.a.
1968	232	—
1975	320	+4.70%
1982	369	+2.06%
1990	379	+0.33%
1999	456	+2.08%
2007	553	+2.44%
2012	633	+2.74%
2017	609	−0.77%
2023	554	−1.57%
Source: INSEE

== Places of interest ==
- The church of Sts.Pierre & Paul, dating from the thirteenth century.
- The dovecote of Mesnil Grain.

== See also ==
- Communes of the Seine-Maritime department
