= Bosc-Édeline =

- Commune
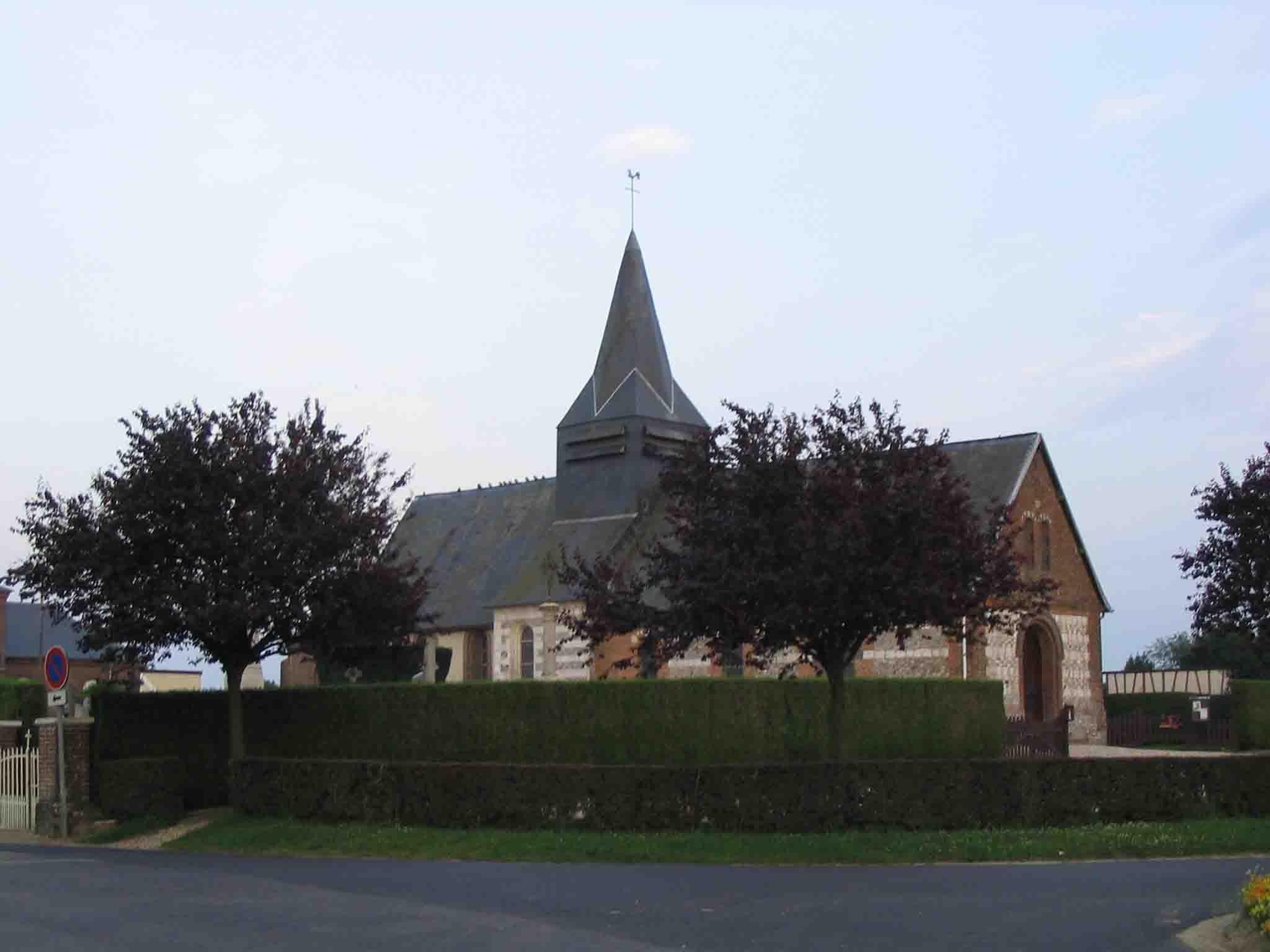
- The church in Bosc-Édeline
- Location of Bosc-Édeline
- Location within France Location within Normandy
- Coordinates: 49°34′16″N 1°25′38″E
- Country: France
- Region: Normandy
- Department: Seine-Maritime
- Arrondissement: Rouen
- Canton: Le Mesnil-Esnard

Government
  - Mayor (2026–32): Denis Leboucher
- Area^{1}: 6.19 km^{2} (2.39 sq mi)
- Elevation: 226 m (741 ft)
- Highest elevation: 232 m (761 ft)
- Lowest elevation: 168 m (551 ft)
- Population (2023): 357
  - Density: 57.7/km^{2} (149/sq mi)
- Time zone: UTC+01:00 (CET)
  - Summer (DST): UTC+02:00 (CEST)
- INSEE/Postal code: 76121 /76750
- ^{1} French Land Register data, which excludes lakes, ponds, glaciers > 1 km^{2} (0.386 sq mi or 247 acres) and river estuaries.

Bosc-Édeline is a commune in the Seine-Maritime department in the Normandy region in northern France.

== Geography ==
A farming village situated in the Pays de Bray some 19 miles (31 km) northeast of Rouen, at the junction of the D61 and the D38 roads.

== Population ==
Historical population
Year	Pop.	±% p.a.
1968	189	—
1975	182	−0.54%
1982	246	+4.40%
1990	257	+0.55%
1999	284	+1.12%
2007	308	+1.02%
2012	338	+1.88%
2017	360	+1.27%
2023	357	−0.14%
Source: INSEE

== Places of interest ==
- The church of the Trinity, dating from the thirteenth century.

== See also ==
- Communes of the Seine-Maritime department
