= Longuerue =

- Commune
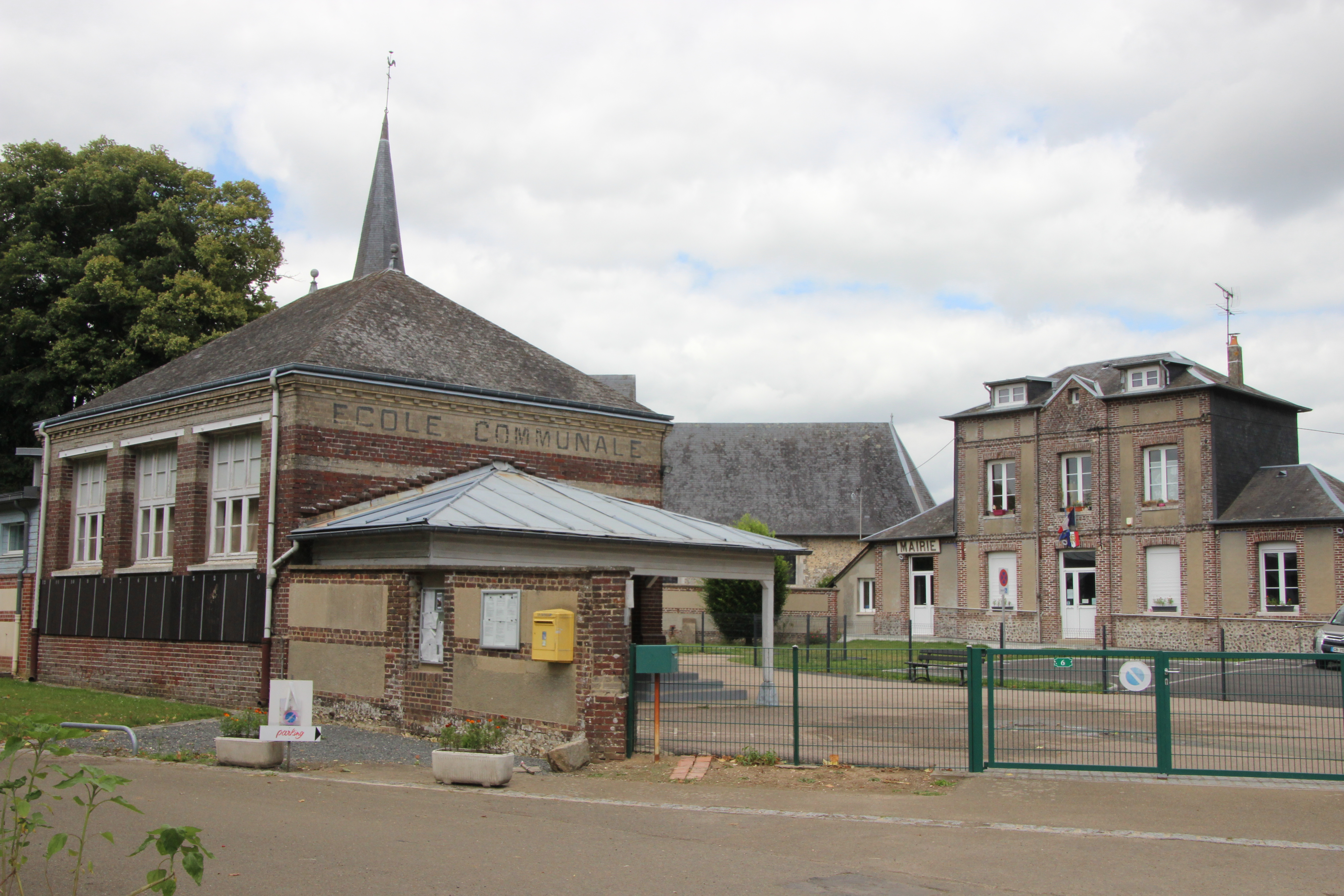
- Longuerue Town hall
- Location of Longuerue
- Location within France Location within Normandy
- Coordinates: 49°32′52″N 1°17′38″E
- Country: France
- Region: Normandy
- Department: Seine-Maritime
- Arrondissement: Rouen
- Canton: Le Mesnil-Esnard

Government
  - Mayor (2026–32): Jacques Petit
- Area^{1}: 5.36 km^{2} (2.07 sq mi)
- Elevation: 170 m (560 ft)
- Highest elevation: 181 m (594 ft)
- Lowest elevation: 130 m (430 ft)
- Population (2023): 346
  - Density: 64.6/km^{2} (167/sq mi)
- Time zone: UTC+01:00 (CET)
  - Summer (DST): UTC+02:00 (CEST)
- INSEE/Postal code: 76396 /76750
- ^{1} French Land Register data, which excludes lakes, ponds, glaciers > 1 km^{2} (0.386 sq mi or 247 acres) and river estuaries.

Longuerue (French pronunciation: [lɔ̃ɡʁy]) is a commune in the Seine-Maritime department in the Normandy region in northern France.

== Population ==
Historical population
| Year | Pop. | ±% p.a. |
|---|---|---|
| 1968 | 209 | — |
| 1975 | 232 | +1.50% |
| 1982 | 281 | +2.78% |
| 1990 | 279 | −0.09% |
| 1999 | 280 | +0.04% |
| 2007 | 303 | +0.99% |
| 2012 | 301 | −0.13% |
| 2017 | 327 | +1.67% |
| 2023 | 346 | +0.95% |
Source: INSEE

== See also ==
Communes of the Seine-Maritime department
