= Ernemont-sur-Buchy =

- Commune
- Location of Ernemont-sur-Buchy
- Location within France Location within Normandy
- Coordinates: 49°32′24″N 1°21′41″E
- Country: France
- Region: Normandy
- Department: Seine-Maritime
- Arrondissement: Rouen
- Canton: Le Mesnil-Esnard

Government
  - Mayor (2020–2026): Dominique Houel
- Area^{1}: 4.04 km^{2} (1.56 sq mi)
- Elevation: 165 m (541 ft)
- Highest elevation: 176 m (577 ft)
- Lowest elevation: 120 m (390 ft)
- Population (2023): 291
  - Density: 72.0/km^{2} (187/sq mi)
- Time zone: UTC+01:00 (CET)
  - Summer (DST): UTC+02:00 (CEST)
- INSEE/Postal code: 76243 /76750
- ^{1} French Land Register data, which excludes lakes, ponds, glaciers > 1 km^{2} (0.386 sq mi or 247 acres) and river estuaries.

Ernemont-sur-Buchy is a commune in the Seine-Maritime department in the Normandy region in northern France.

The inhabitants of the town of Ernemont-sur-Buchy are called Ernemontois, Ernemontoises in French.

== Geography ==
A small farming village situated in the Pays de Bray, some 16 miles (26 km) northeast of Rouen at the junction of the D61, D93 and the D290 roads.

== Population ==
Historical population
Year	Pop.	±% p.a.
1968	121	—
1975	116	−0.60%
1982	177	+6.22%
1990	184	+0.49%
1999	187	+0.18%
2007	197	+0.65%
2012	267	+6.27%
2017	299	+2.29%
2023	291	−0.45%
Source: INSEE

== Places of interest ==
- An eighteenth-century chateau.
- The church of St. Sauveur, dating from the end of the seventeenth - beginning of the eighteenth century.
- A convent/hospice from the seventeenth century (established in 1690).
- A sixteenth century manor house.

== See also ==
- Communes of the Seine-Maritime department
