= Catenay =

- Commune
- Coat of arms
- Location of Catenay
- Location within France Location within Normandy
- Coordinates: 49°30′47″N 1°19′33″E
- Country: France
- Region: Normandy
- Department: Seine-Maritime
- Arrondissement: Rouen
- Canton: Le Mesnil-Esnard

Government
  - Mayor (2020–2026): Norbert Cajot
- Area^{1}: 5.88 km^{2} (2.27 sq mi)
- Elevation: 176 m (577 ft)
- Highest elevation: 170 m (560 ft)
- Lowest elevation: 87 m (285 ft)
- Population (2023): 702
  - Density: 119/km^{2} (309/sq mi)
- Time zone: UTC+01:00 (CET)
  - Summer (DST): UTC+02:00 (CEST)
- INSEE/Postal code: 76163 /76116
- ^{1} French Land Register data, which excludes lakes, ponds, glaciers > 1 km^{2} (0.386 sq mi or 247 acres) and river estuaries.

Catenay (French pronunciation: [katnɛ]) is a commune situated upon the Seine-Maritime department which are in the Normandy region in northern France.

== Geography ==
It contains a farming village situated by the banks of the river Crevon, some 13 miles (21 km) northeast of Rouen, at the junction of the D7 and the D261 roads.

== Population ==
Historical population
Year	Pop.	±% p.a.
1968	270	—
1975	330	+2.91%
1982	550	+7.57%
1990	632	+1.75%
1999	651	+0.33%
2007	732	+1.48%
2012	700	−0.89%
2017	678	−0.64%
2023	702	+0.58%
Source: INSEE

== Places of interest ==
- The church of St.Clair, dating from the nineteenth century.
- Château de Montlambert.

== See also ==
- Communes of the Seine-Maritime department
