= Sainte-Croix-sur-Buchy =

- Commune
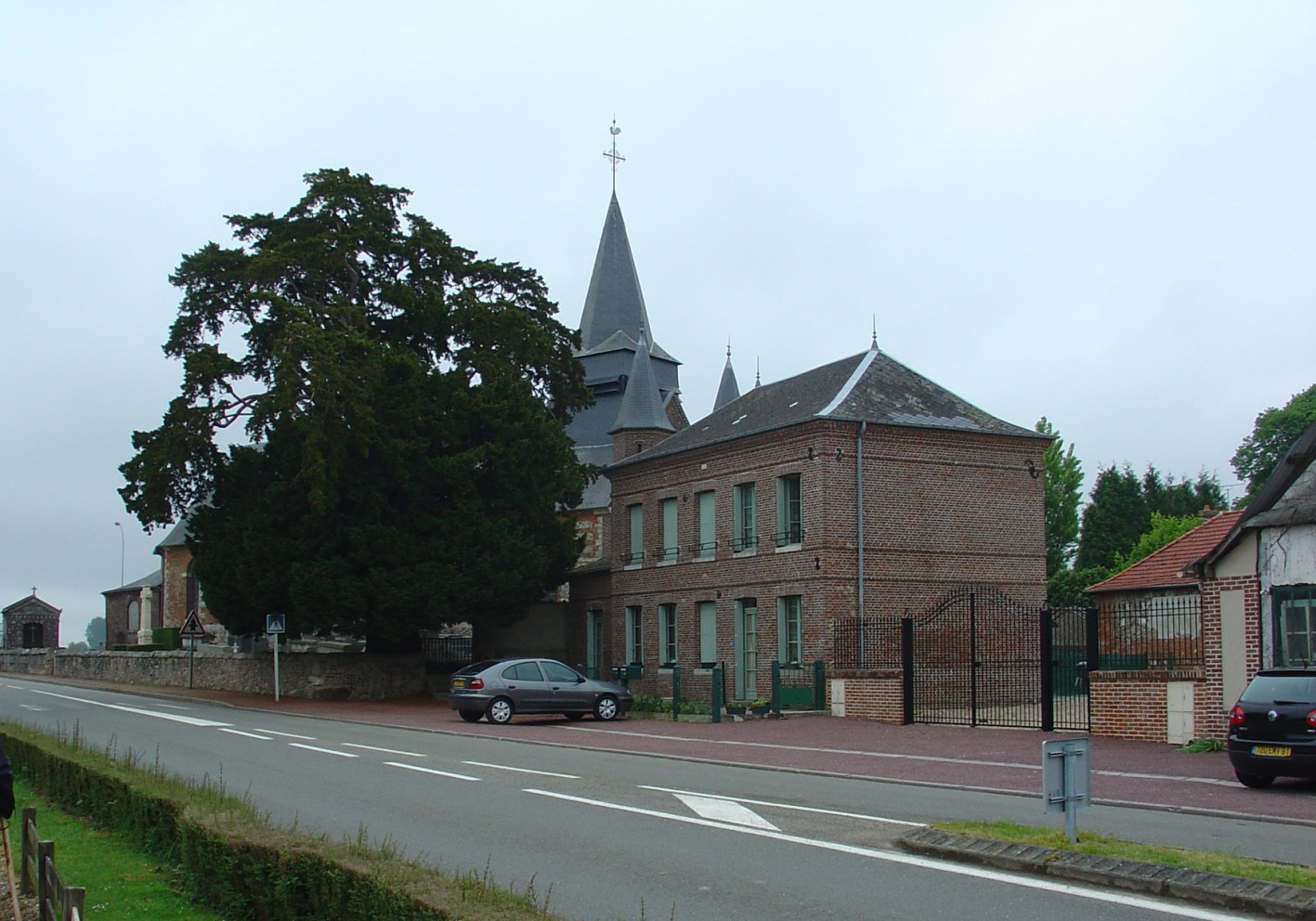
- The centre of Sainte-Croix-sur-Buchy
- Location of Sainte-Croix-sur-Buchy
- Location within France Location within Normandy
- Coordinates: 49°33′55″N 1°21′04″E
- Country: France
- Region: Normandy
- Department: Seine-Maritime
- Arrondissement: Rouen
- Canton: Le Mesnil-Esnard

Government
  - Mayor (2026–32): Patrick Flautre
- Area^{1}: 13.8 km^{2} (5.3 sq mi)
- Elevation: 190 m (620 ft)
- Highest elevation: 195 m (640 ft)
- Lowest elevation: 120 m (390 ft)
- Population (2023): 661
  - Density: 47.9/km^{2} (124/sq mi)
- Time zone: UTC+01:00 (CET)
  - Summer (DST): UTC+02:00 (CEST)
- INSEE/Postal code: 76571 /76750
- ^{1} French Land Register data, which excludes lakes, ponds, glaciers > 1 km^{2} (0.386 sq mi or 247 acres) and river estuaries.

Sainte-Croix-sur-Buchy (French pronunciation: [sɛ̃t kʁwa syʁ byʃi], literally Sainte-Croix on Buchy) is a commune in the Seine-Maritime department in the Normandy region in northern France.

The inhabitants of the town of Sainte-Croix-sur-Buchy are called Saint-Cruciens, Saint-Cruciennes in French.

== Geography ==
A farming village situated in the Pays de Bray, some 16 miles (26 km) northeast of Rouen at the junction of the D7, D90, D93 and the D98 roads.

== Population ==
Historical population
Year	Pop.	±% p.a.
1968	438	—
1975	460	+0.70%
1982	462	+0.06%
1990	512	+1.29%
1999	545	+0.70%
2007	671	+2.63%
2012	683	+0.36%
2017	697	+0.41%
2023	661	−0.88%
Source: INSEE

== Places of interest ==
- The church of St. Croix, dating from the sixteenth century.
- The church of St. Médard & St. Godard, dating from the twelfth century.
- Traces of the chateau du Grand Beslel.
- The seventeenth-century stone cross in the cemetery.

== See also ==
- Communes of the Seine-Maritime department
