= Route nationale 31 =

Road in France

The Route nationale 31 is a motorway in northern France. It connects the town of Rouen to Reims, it is also the European Route 46.

== Route ==
The road starts in the City of Rouen, the road starts heading east. The road heads through the Forêt de Lyons passing the Hêtre de la Bunodière. The road then passes the town of Gournay-en-Bray. The road crosses the Pays de Bray then by-pass the town of Beauvais. The old N 31 (now D 931) skirts the Forêt du Parc Saint-Quentin before entering Beauvais. In the town it crosses the N 1 (now numbered the D 1001). To the east of the town is a junction (15) with the A16 autoroute.

To the east of Beauvais the N 31 has been upgraded to a dual-carriageway. The original route is now numbered the D 931. At Clermont the road has a junction with the N 16 (now numbered the D 1016 and D 916). After Catenay, the N 31 is single carriageway again. After 15 km the road crosses the N 17 (now numbered the D 1017) and then has a junction (10) with the A1 autoroute. the road then enters the town of Compiègne. The road leaves the town to the north east through the Forêt de Compiègne along the banks of the river Aisne. At Soissons the road crosses the N 2.

The road continues to follow the Aisne and then the river Vesle to the south east. It passes through the town of Fismes. The road enters the town of Reims at junction (22) of the A4 autoroute.

The road originally continued further east merged with the N 44 (now D 944) and after 5 km splitting to the east. The road is now numbered the D 931. It passes through Suippes where it once met the N 77 (now D 977). Much of the surrounding countryside is reserved for military purposes. The road finally ends in Valmy, west of Sainte-Menehould joining the N 3.
