= Ry, Seine-Maritime =

Administrative division of Normandy, France

Ry
- Commune
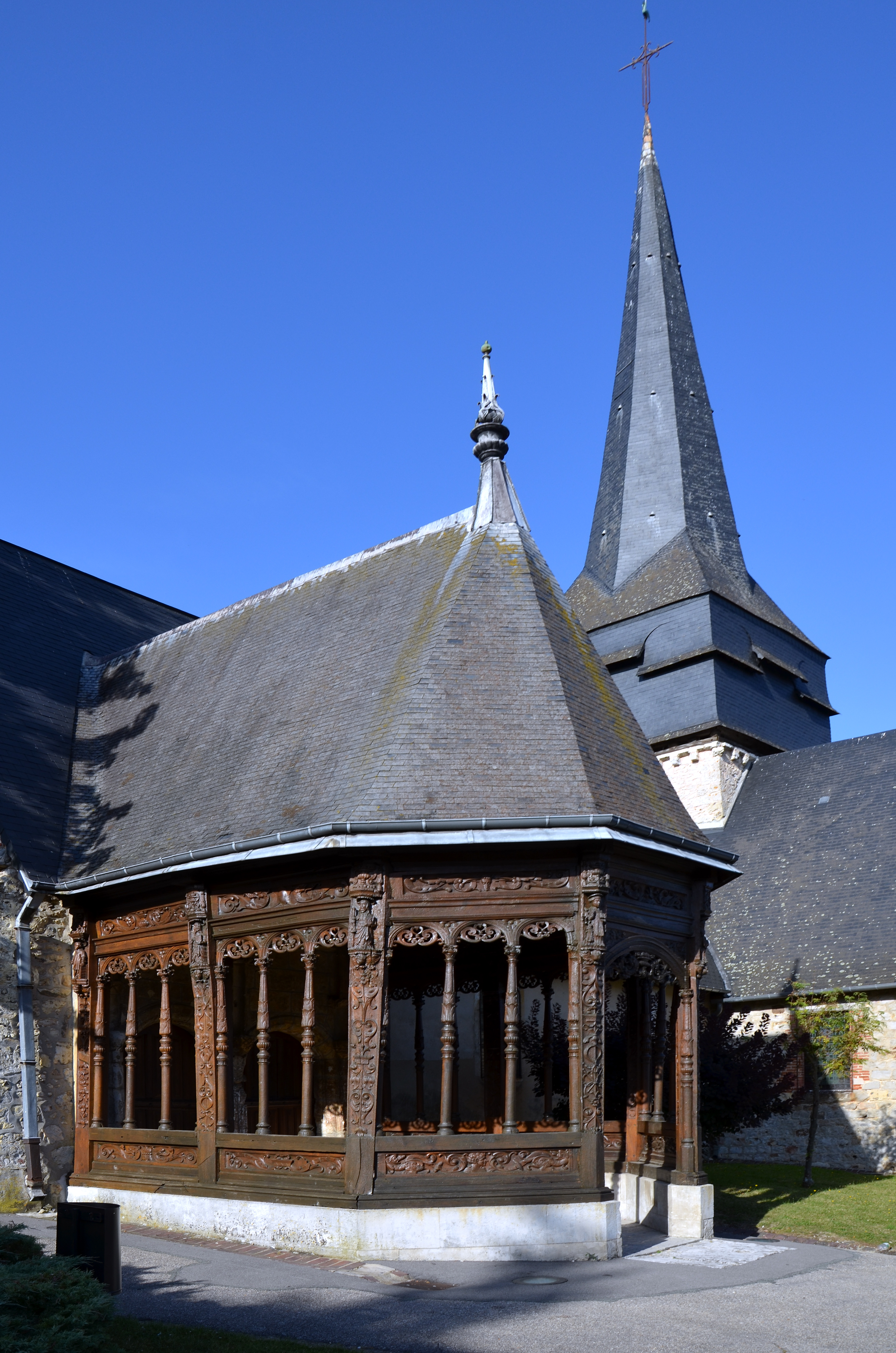
- The church in Ry
- Location of Ry
- Location within France Location within Normandy
- Coordinates: 49°28′19″N 1°20′40″E
- Country: France
- Region: Normandy
- Department: Seine-Maritime
- Arrondissement: Rouen
- Canton: Le Mesnil-Esnard
- Intercommunality: CC Inter-Caux-Vexin

Government
  - Mayor (2026–32): Christophe Hoguet
- Area^{1}: 5.71 km^{2} (2.20 sq mi)
- Elevation: 75 m (246 ft)
- Highest elevation: 157 m (515 ft)
- Lowest elevation: 68 m (223 ft)
- Population (2023): 787
  - Density: 138/km^{2} (357/sq mi)
- Time zone: UTC+01:00 (CET)
  - Summer (DST): UTC+02:00 (CEST)
- INSEE/Postal code: 76548 /76116
- ^{1} French Land Register data, which excludes lakes, ponds, glaciers > 1 km^{2} (0.386 sq mi or 247 acres) and river estuaries.

Ry (pronounced [ʁi]) is a commune in the Seine-Maritime department in the Normandy region in northern France.

== Geography ==
A farming village situated by the banks of the small river Crevon, some 12 miles (19 km) northeast of Rouen at the junction of the D12, D13, D62 and the D93 roads.

The village of Yonville in Gustave Flaubert's Madame Bovary is traditionally held to have been based on Ry.

== Population ==
Historical population
Year	Pop.	±% p.a.
1968	527	—
1975	525	−0.05%
1982	544	+0.51%
1990	610	+1.44%
1999	605	−0.09%
2007	742	+2.58%
2012	800	+1.52%
2017	712	−2.30%
2023	787	+1.68%
Source: INSEE

== Places of interest ==
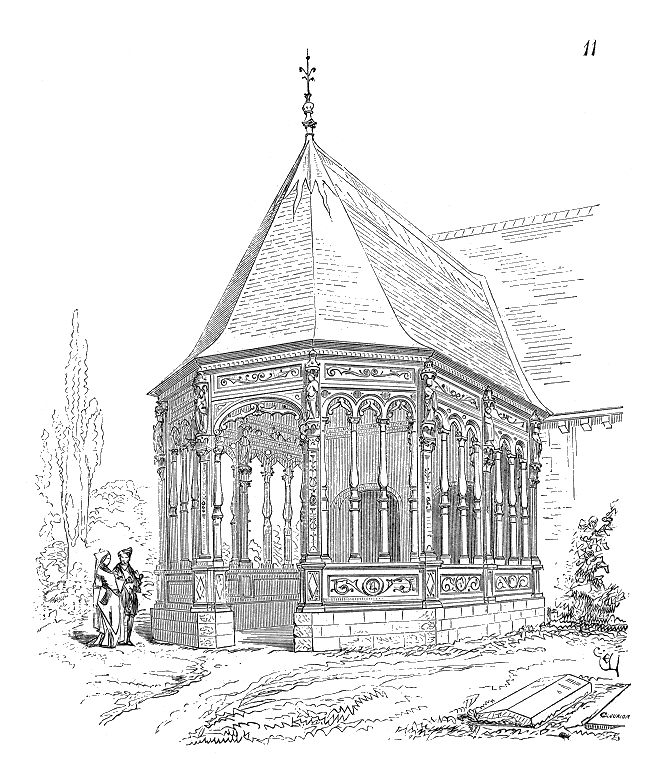
The church porch

- The church of St. Sulpice, dating from the twelfth century, with a sixteenth-century wooden porch.
- The eighteenth-century Château de Vascoeuil.
- The automaton museum.

== See also ==
- Communes of the Seine-Maritime department
