= Communauté de communes Plateau de Caux-Fleur de Lin =

Coordinates: 49.7207°N 0.7841°E

Plateau de Caux-Fleur de Lin
- Former communauté de communes
- Interactive map of Plateau de Caux-Fleur de Lin
- Country: France
- Region: Normandy
- Department: Seine-Maritime
- No. of communes: {{{nbcomm}}}
- Established: 2001
- Disbanded: 2017
- Area: 119.68 km^{2} (46.21 sq mi)
- Population (2013): 9,436
  - Density: 78.84/km^{2} (204.2/sq mi)

The communauté de communes Plateau de Caux-Fleur de Lin was created on and is located in the Seine-Maritime département of the Normandy region of northern France. It was created in December 2001. It was merged into the new Communauté de communes Plateau de Caux-Doudeville-Yerville in January 2017.

== Participants ==
The Communauté de communes comprised the following communes:

- Amfreville-les-Champs
- Anvéville
- Bénesville
- Berville, Seine-Maritime
- Boudeville
- Bretteville-Saint-Laurent
- Canville-les-Deux-Églises
- Carville-Pot-de-Fer
- Doudeville
- Étalleville
- Fultot
- Gonzeville
- Harcanville
- Héricourt-en-Caux
- Le Torp-Mesnil
- Pretot-Vicquemare
- Reuville
- Robertot
- Routes
- Saint-Laurent-en-Caux
- Yvecrique

== See also ==
- Communes of the Seine-Maritime department
