= Canton of Doudeville =

Coordinates: 49°43′52″N 0°49′46″E

Doudeville
- Former canton
- Interactive map of Doudeville
- Country: France
- Region: Normandy
- Department: Seine-Maritime
- No. of communes: {{{nbcomm}}}
- Disbanded: 2015
- Area: 100.61 km^{2} (38.85 sq mi)
- Population (2012): 8,220
  - Density: 81.7/km^{2} (212/sq mi)

The Canton of Doudeville is a former canton situated in the Seine-Maritime département and in the Haute-Normandie region of northern France. It was disbanded following the French canton reorganisation which came into effect in March 2015. It consisted of 17 communes, which joined the canton of Yvetot in 2015. It had a total of 8,220 inhabitants (2012).

== Geography ==
A farmland area in the arrondissement of Rouen, centred on the town of Doudeville. The altitude varies from 75m (Hautot-Saint-Sulpice) to 167m (Amfreville-les-Champs) with an average altitude of 135m.

The canton comprised 17 communes:

- Amfreville-les-Champs
- Bénesville
- Berville
- Boudeville
- Bretteville-Saint-Laurent
- Canville-les-Deux-Églises
- Doudeville
- Étalleville
- Fultot
- Gonzeville
- Harcanville
- Hautot-Saint-Sulpice
- Prétot-Vicquemare
- Reuville
- Saint-Laurent-en-Caux
- Le Torp-Mesnil
- Yvecrique

== Population ==
Historical population Canton of Doudeville
Year	1962	1968	1975	1982	1990	1999
Pop.	5,354	5,850	5,876	6,585	7,257	7,380
±%	—	+9.3%	+0.4%	+12.1%	+10.2%	+1.7%
From the year 1962 on: No double counting – residents of multiple communes (e.g. students and military personnel) are counted only once. Source: INSEE

== See also ==
- Arrondissements of the Seine-Maritime department
- Cantons of the Seine-Maritime department
- Communes of the Seine-Maritime department
