= Criquetot-sur-Ouville =

- Commune
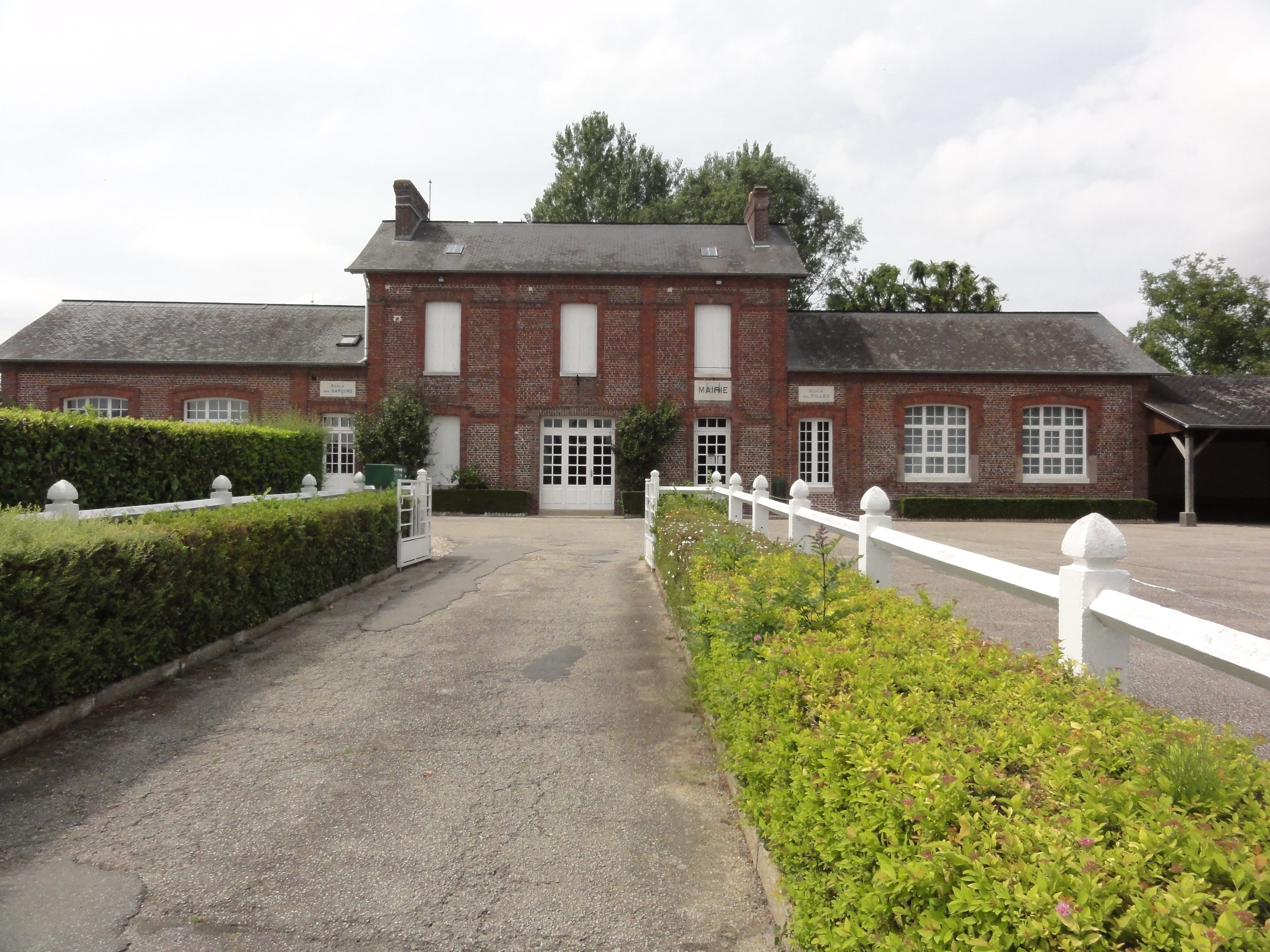
- Town hall
- Location of Criquetot-sur-Ouville
- Location within France Location within Normandy
- Coordinates: 49°40′38″N 0°50′49″E
- Country: France
- Region: Normandy
- Department: Seine-Maritime
- Arrondissement: Rouen
- Canton: Yvetot
- Intercommunality: CC Plateau de Caux

Government
  - Mayor (2020–2026): François Bouteiller
- Area^{1}: 5.83 km^{2} (2.25 sq mi)
- Elevation: 1,601 m (5,253 ft)
- Highest elevation: 172 m (564 ft)
- Lowest elevation: 144 m (472 ft)
- Population (2023): 817
  - Density: 140/km^{2} (363/sq mi)
- Time zone: UTC+01:00 (CET)
  - Summer (DST): UTC+02:00 (CEST)
- INSEE/Postal code: 76198 /76760
- ^{1} French Land Register data, which excludes lakes, ponds, glaciers > 1 km^{2} (0.386 sq mi or 247 acres) and river estuaries.

Criquetot-sur-Ouville (French pronunciation: [kʁikto syʁ uvil], literally Criquetot on Ouville) is a commune in the Seine-Maritime department in the Normandy region in northern France.

== Geography ==
A farming village situated in the Pays de Caux, some 23 miles (37 km) northwest of Rouen, at the junction of the D55, D88 and the D253 roads.

== Population ==
Historical population
Year	Pop.	±% p.a.
1968	375	—
1975	390	+0.56%
1982	494	+3.43%
1990	510	+0.40%
1999	610	+2.01%
2007	697	+1.68%
2012	766	+1.91%
2017	811	+1.15%
2023	817	+0.12%
Source: INSEE

== Places of interest ==
- The church of St.Martin, dating from the eighteenth century.
- Ruins of a feudal castle.
- An eighteenth-century chateau.

== Notable people ==
- The painter Charles Angrand was born here in 1854.

== See also ==
- Communes of the Seine-Maritime department
