= Flamanville =

Flamanville may refer to:

- Flamanville, Manche, a commune in the Manche département
  - Flamanville Nuclear Power Plant
- Flamanville, Seine-Maritime, a commune in the Seine-Maritime département
