= Communauté de communes Plateau de Caux =

Federation of municipalities in France

Plateau de Caux
- Communauté de communes
- Interactive map of Plateau de Caux
- Coordinates: 49°43′N 00°47′E
- Country: France
- Region: Normandy
- Department: Seine-Maritime
- No. of communes: {{{nbcomm}}}
- Established: 2017
- Area: 252.6 km^{2} (97.5 sq mi)
- Population (2018): 21,005
  - Density: 83.16/km^{2} (215.4/sq mi)

The Communauté de communes Plateau de Caux (before October 2021: Communauté de communes Plateau de Caux-Doudeville-Yerville) is a communauté de communes in the Seine-Maritime département and in the Normandy région of France. It was formed on 1 January 2017 by the merger of the former Communauté de communes d'Yerville-Plateau de Caux and Communauté de communes Plateau de Caux-Fleur de Lin on 1 January 2017. It consists of 40 communes, and its seat is in Doudeville. Its area is 252.6 km^{2}. Its population was 21,005 in 2018.

== Composition ==
The communauté de communes consists of the following 40 communes:

1. Amfreville-les-Champs
2. Ancretiéville-Saint-Victor
3. Anvéville
4. Auzouville-l'Esneval
5. Bénesville
6. Berville-en-Caux
7. Boudeville
8. Bourdainville
9. Bretteville-Saint-Laurent
10. Butot
11. Canville-les-Deux-Églises
12. Carville-Pot-de-Fer
13. Cideville
14. Criquetot-sur-Ouville
15. Doudeville
16. Ectot-l'Auber
17. Ectot-lès-Baons
18. Étalleville
19. Étoutteville
20. Flamanville
21. Fultot
22. Gonzeville
23. Grémonville
24. Harcanville
25. Héricourt-en-Caux
26. Hugleville-en-Caux
27. Lindebeuf
28. Motteville
29. Ouville-l'Abbaye
30. Prétot-Vicquemare
31. Reuville
32. Robertot
33. Routes
34. Saint-Laurent-en-Caux
35. Saint-Martin-aux-Arbres
36. Saussay
37. Le Torp-Mesnil
38. Vibeuf
39. Yerville
40. Yvecrique
