= Saint-Martin-aux-Arbres =

- Commune
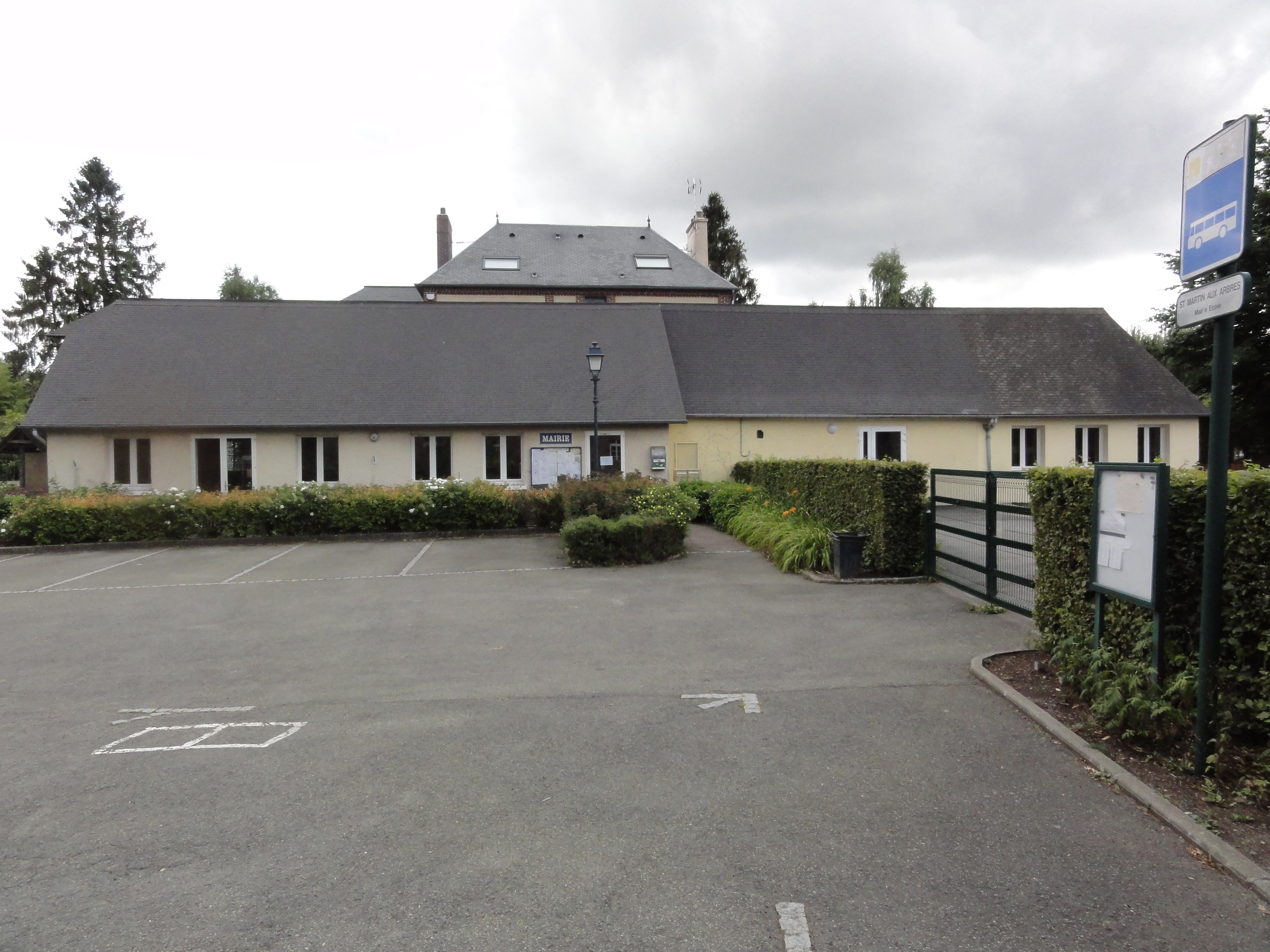
- Town hall

- Coat of arms
- Location of Saint-Martin-aux-Arbres
- Location within France Location within Normandy
- Coordinates: 49°39′00″N 0°53′39″E
- Country: France
- Region: Normandy
- Department: Seine-Maritime
- Arrondissement: Rouen
- Canton: Yvetot
- Intercommunality: CC Plateau de Caux

Government
  - Mayor (2026–32): Sandra Angot-Alleaume
- Area^{1}: 5.14 km^{2} (1.98 sq mi)
- Elevation: 170 m (560 ft)
- Highest elevation: 175 m (574 ft)
- Lowest elevation: 147 m (482 ft)
- Population (2023): 297
  - Density: 57.8/km^{2} (150/sq mi)
- Time zone: UTC+01:00 (CET)
  - Summer (DST): UTC+02:00 (CEST)
- INSEE/Postal code: 76611 /76760
- ^{1} French Land Register data, which excludes lakes, ponds, glaciers > 1 km^{2} (0.386 sq mi or 247 acres) and river estuaries.

Saint-Martin-aux-Arbres (French pronunciation: [sɛ̃ maʁtɛ̃ o.z‿aʁbʁ]) is a commune in the Seine-Maritime department in the Normandy region in northern France.

== Geography ==
A farming village situated in the Pays de Caux, some 22 miles (35 km) northwest of Rouen at the junction of the D467, D88 and the D142 roads. The A29 autoroute forms most of the northern border of the commune.

== Heraldry ==
| Arms of Saint-Martin-aux-Arbres | The arms of Saint-Martin-aux-Arbres are blazoned : Gules, St. Martin on horseback dividing his cloak with an upright beggar to sinister Or, and on a chief argent, 3 trees vert. |

== Population ==
Historical population
| Year | Pop. | ±% p.a. |
|---|---|---|
| 1968 | 243 | — |
| 1975 | 230 | −0.78% |
| 1982 | 218 | −0.76% |
| 1990 | 287 | +3.50% |
| 1999 | 283 | −0.16% |
| 2007 | 289 | +0.26% |
| 2012 | 318 | +1.93% |
| 2017 | 324 | +0.37% |
| 2023 | 297 | −1.44% |
Source: INSEE

== Places of interest ==
- The church of St. Martin, dating from the thirteenth century.

== See also ==
- Communes of the Seine-Maritime department
