= Bourdainville =

- Commune
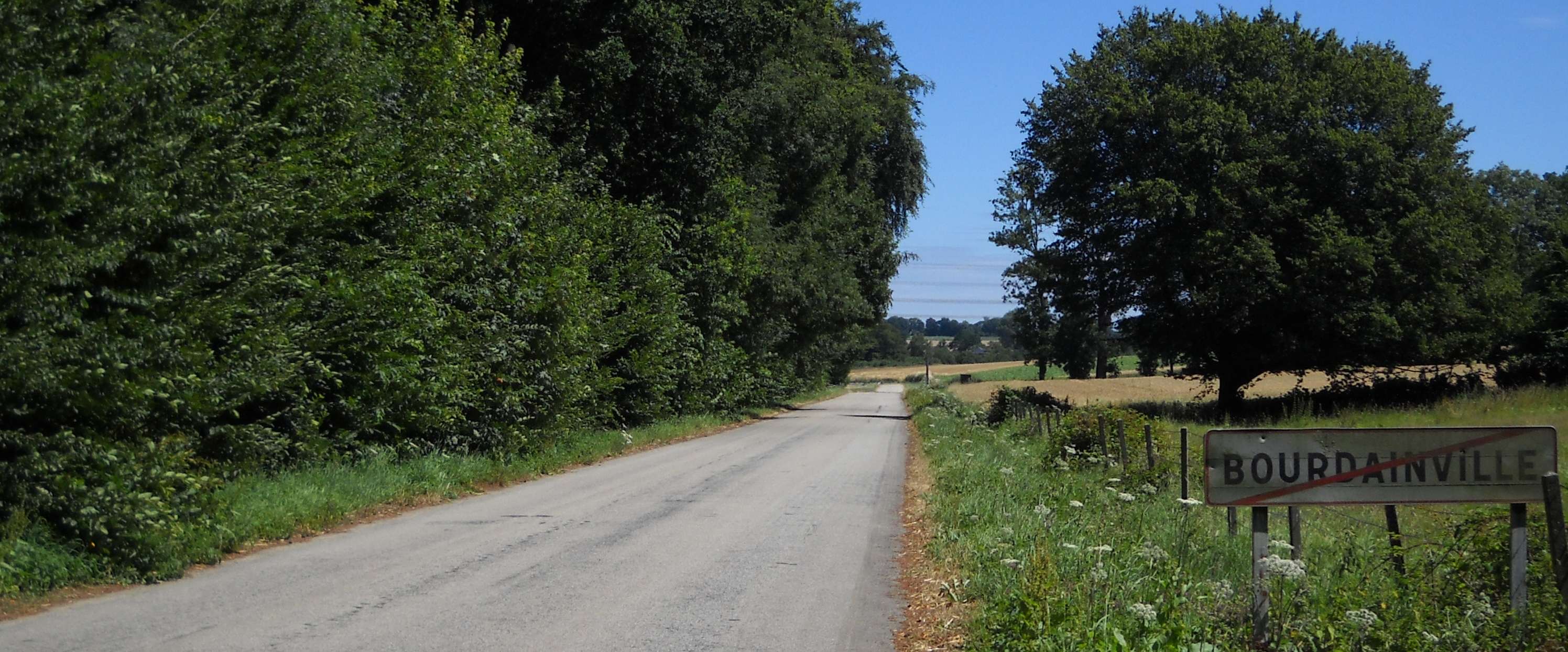
- Former French road RN29
- Location of Bourdainville
- Location within France Location within Normandy
- Coordinates: 49°40′31″N 0°56′42″E
- Country: France
- Region: Normandy
- Department: Seine-Maritime
- Arrondissement: Rouen
- Canton: Yvetot
- Intercommunality: CC Plateau de Caux

Government
  - Mayor (2026–32): Séverine Gest
- Area^{1}: 5.34 km^{2} (2.06 sq mi)
- Elevation: 158 m (518 ft)
- Highest elevation: 169 m (554 ft)
- Lowest elevation: 102 m (335 ft)
- Population (2023): 479
  - Density: 89.7/km^{2} (232/sq mi)
- Time zone: UTC+01:00 (CET)
  - Summer (DST): UTC+02:00 (CEST)
- INSEE/Postal code: 76132 /76760
- ^{1} French Land Register data, which excludes lakes, ponds, glaciers > 1 km^{2} (0.386 sq mi or 247 acres) and river estuaries.

Bourdainville (French pronunciation: [buʁdɛ̃vil]) is a commune in the Seine-Maritime department in the Normandy region in northern France.

== Geography ==
A farming village situated in the Pays de Caux some 27 miles (43 km) north of Rouen, at the junction of the D103 and the D929 roads.

== Population ==
Historical population
Year	Pop.	±% p.a.
1968	295	—
1975	377	+3.57%
1982	309	−2.80%
1990	314	+0.20%
1999	319	+0.18%
2007	419	+3.47%
2012	447	+1.30%
2017	463	+0.71%
2023	479	+0.57%
Source: INSEE

== Places of interest ==
- The church of St.Pierre, dating from the nineteenth century.
- Remains of a feudal castle.
- A chateau.

== See also ==
- Communes of the Seine-Maritime department
