= Ectot-l'Auber =

Ectot-l’Auber
- Commune
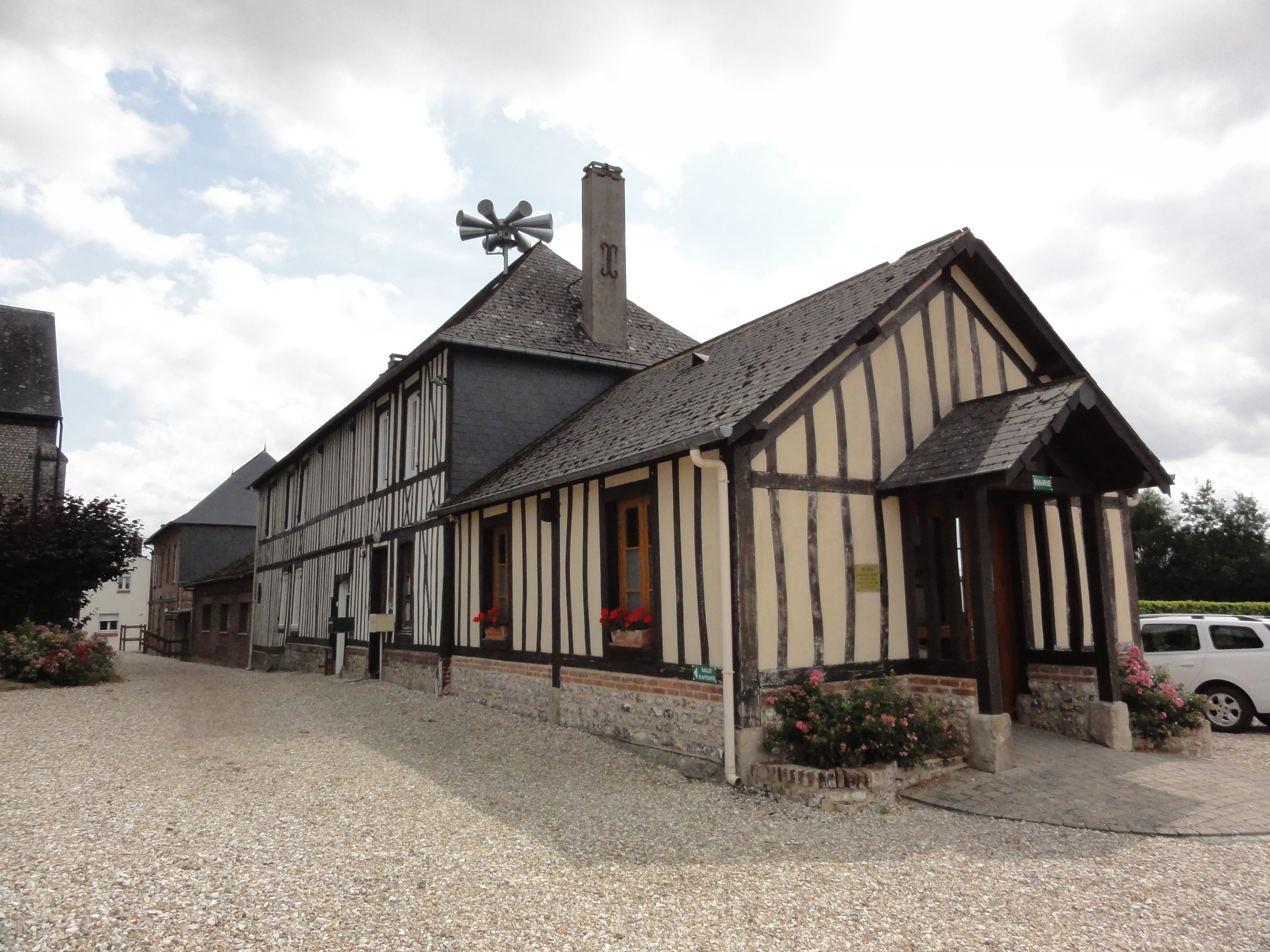
- Town hall

- Coat of arms
- Location of Ectot-l’Auber
- Location within France Location within Normandy
- Coordinates: 49°39′01″N 0°55′51″E
- Country: France
- Region: Normandy
- Department: Seine-Maritime
- Arrondissement: Rouen
- Canton: Yvetot
- Intercommunality: CC Plateau de Caux

Government
  - Mayor (2020–2026): Didier Delamare
- Area^{1}: 5 km^{2} (1.9 sq mi)
- Elevation: 164 m (538 ft)
- Highest elevation: 174 m (571 ft)
- Lowest elevation: 133 m (436 ft)
- Population (2023): 729
  - Density: 150/km^{2} (380/sq mi)
- Time zone: UTC+01:00 (CET)
  - Summer (DST): UTC+02:00 (CEST)
- INSEE/Postal code: 76227 /76760
- ^{1} French Land Register data, which excludes lakes, ponds, glaciers > 1 km^{2} (0.386 sq mi or 247 acres) and river estuaries.

Ectot-l’Auber is a commune in the Seine-Maritime department in the Normandy region in northern France.

== Geography ==
A farming village situated some 19 miles (31 km) northwest of Rouen at the junction of the D67, D467 and the D253 roads. The A29 autoroute passes along the commune's northern border.

== Population ==
Historical population
Year	Pop.	±% p.a.
1968	241	—
1975	252	+0.64%
1982	330	+3.93%
1990	376	+1.64%
1999	430	+1.50%
2007	542	+2.94%
2012	597	+1.95%
2017	677	+2.55%
2023	729	+1.24%
Source: INSEE

== Places of interest ==
- The church of Notre-Dame, dating from the sixteenth century.

== See also ==
- Communes of the Seine-Maritime department
