= Grémonville =

- Commune
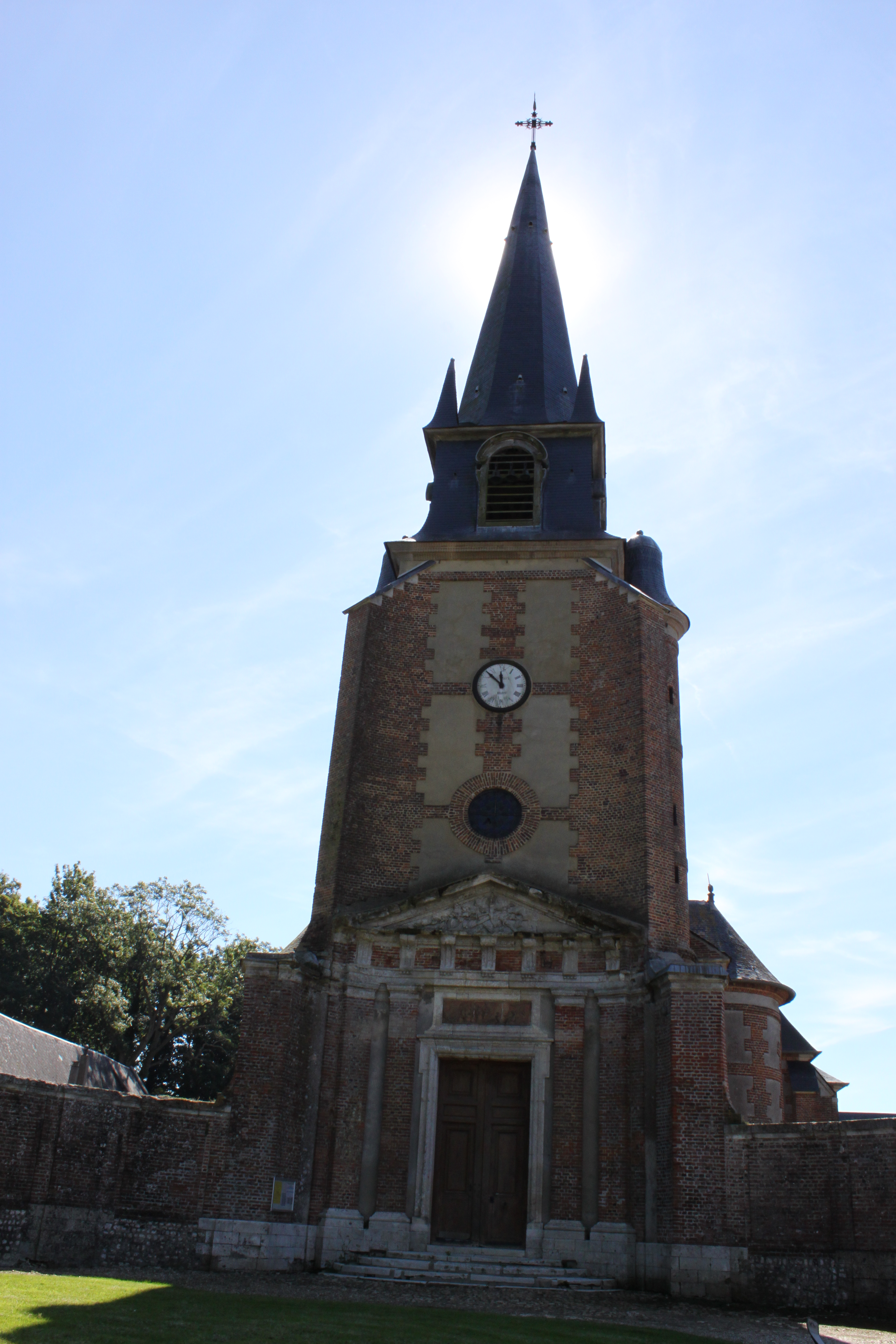
- The church in Grémonville

- Coat of arms
- Location of Grémonville
- Location within France Location within Normandy
- Coordinates: 49°40′17″N 0°49′39″E
- Country: France
- Region: Normandy
- Department: Seine-Maritime
- Arrondissement: Rouen
- Canton: Yvetot
- Intercommunality: CC Plateau de Caux

Government
  - Mayor (2026–32): Daniel Beuzelin
- Area^{1}: 8.27 km^{2} (3.19 sq mi)
- Elevation: 160 m (520 ft)
- Highest elevation: 167 m (548 ft)
- Lowest elevation: 133 m (436 ft)
- Population (2023): 446
  - Density: 53.9/km^{2} (140/sq mi)
- Time zone: UTC+01:00 (CET)
  - Summer (DST): UTC+02:00 (CEST)
- INSEE/Postal code: 76325 /76970
- ^{1} French Land Register data, which excludes lakes, ponds, glaciers > 1 km^{2} (0.386 sq mi or 247 acres) and river estuaries.

Grémonville (French pronunciation: [ɡʁemɔ̃vil]) is a commune in the Seine-Maritime department in the Normandy region in northern France.

== Geography ==
A farming village situated some 19 miles (31 km) northwest of Rouen, at the junction of the D20, D55 and the D253 roads. The A29 autoroute passes through the southern section of the commune's territory.

== Heraldry ==
Arms of Grémonville	The arms of Grémonville are blazoned : Azure, on a chevron argent between 2 leopard heads affronty and a cock, a fleur-de-lys between 2 spur rowels gules.

== Population ==
Historical population
Year	Pop.	±% p.a.
1968	333	—
1975	346	+0.55%
1982	401	+2.13%
1990	452	+1.51%
1999	393	−1.54%
2007	388	−0.16%
2012	416	+1.40%
2017	433	+0.80%
2023	446	+0.49%
Source: INSEE

== Places of interest ==
- The church of Sts.Pierre and Paul, dating from the eighteenth century.
- A seventeenth-century château in Louis XIII style.
- A chapel, built on the site of the old priory.

== Notable people ==
- Micheline Ostermeyer, (1922–2001), a track and field athlete and pianist, spent her last years here.

== See also ==
- Communes of the Seine-Maritime department
