= Lindebeuf =

- Commune
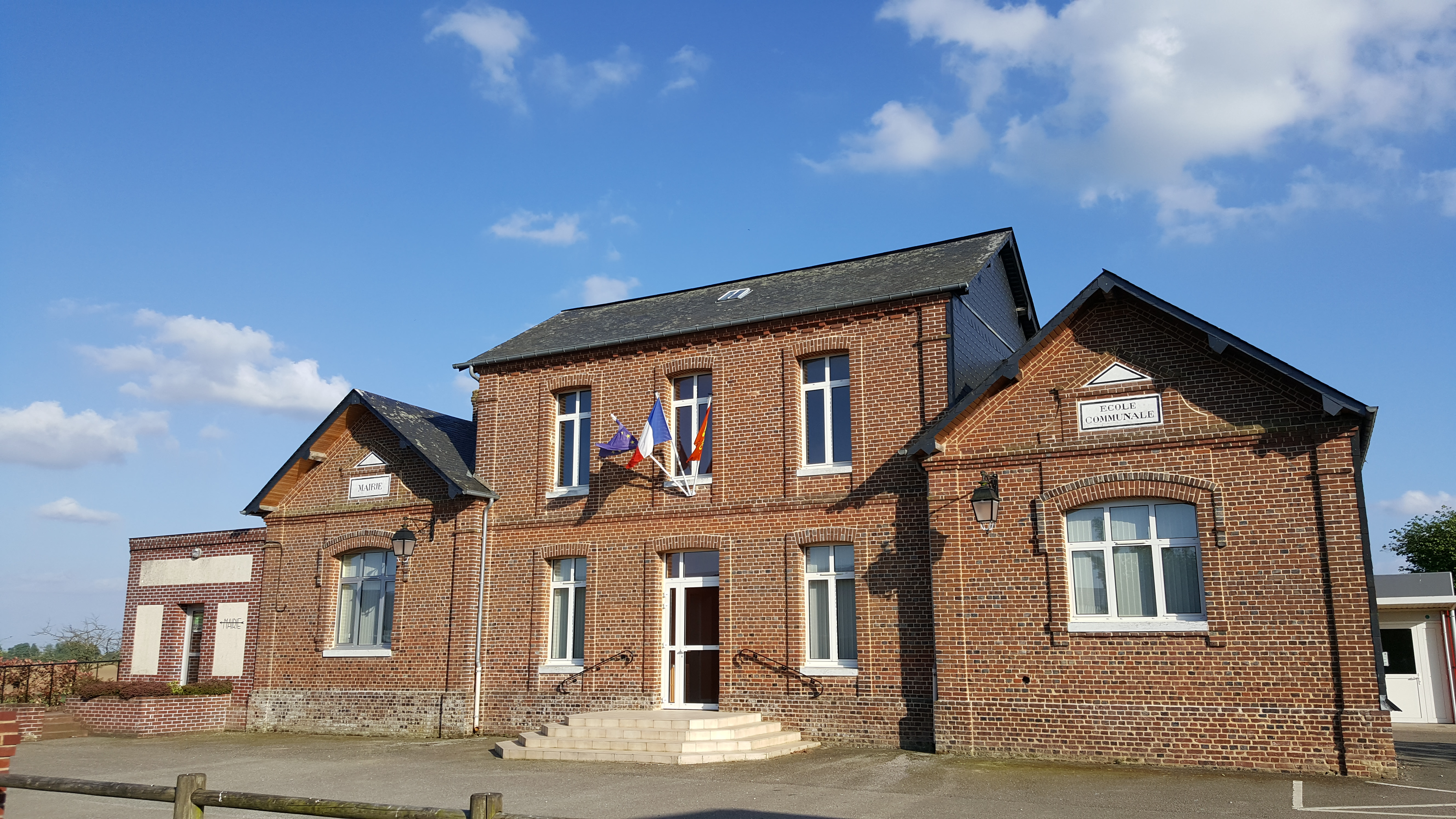
- The town hall in Lindebeuf

- Coat of arms
- Location of Lindebeuf
- Location within France Location within Normandy
- Coordinates: 49°42′43″N 0°54′28″E
- Country: France
- Region: Normandy
- Department: Seine-Maritime
- Arrondissement: Rouen
- Canton: Yvetot
- Intercommunality: CC Plateau de Caux

Government
  - Mayor (2026–32): Julien Leseigneur
- Area^{1}: 4.62 km^{2} (1.78 sq mi)
- Elevation: 155 m (509 ft)
- Highest elevation: 167 m (548 ft)
- Lowest elevation: 120 m (390 ft)
- Population (2023): 386
  - Density: 83.5/km^{2} (216/sq mi)
- Time zone: UTC+01:00 (CET)
  - Summer (DST): UTC+02:00 (CEST)
- INSEE/Postal code: 76387 /76760
- ^{1} French Land Register data, which excludes lakes, ponds, glaciers > 1 km^{2} (0.386 sq mi or 247 acres) and river estuaries.

Lindebeuf (French pronunciation: [lɛ̃dbœf]) is a commune in the Seine-Maritime department in the Normandy region in northern France.

== Geography ==
A farming village situated in the Pays de Caux some 20 miles (32 km) northwest of Rouen, at the junction of the D25, D225 and the D103 roads.

== Population ==
Historical population
Year	Pop.	±% p.a.
1968	207	—
1975	206	−0.07%
1982	266	+3.72%
1990	271	+0.23%
1999	283	+0.48%
2007	339	+2.28%
2012	372	+1.88%
2017	399	+1.41%
2023	386	−0.55%
Source: INSEE

== Places of interest ==
- The church of Notre-Dame, dating from the nineteenth century.
- The ruins of a medieval castle.

== See also ==
- Communes of the Seine-Maritime department
