= Cideville =

- Commune
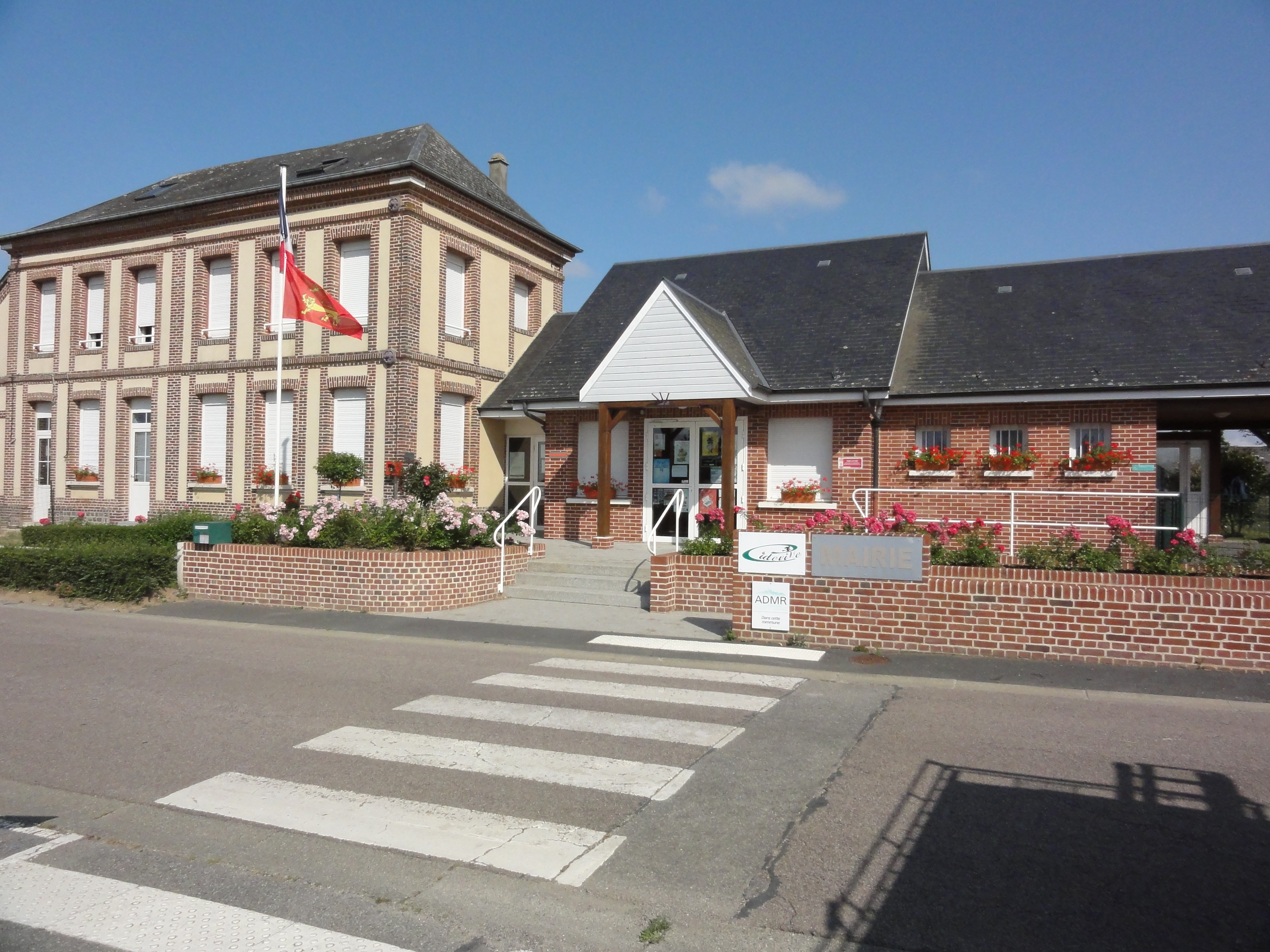
- Cideville Town hall
- Location of Cideville
- Location within France Location within Normandy
- Coordinates: 49°37′01″N 0°53′48″E
- Country: France
- Region: Normandy
- Department: Seine-Maritime
- Arrondissement: Rouen
- Canton: Yvetot
- Intercommunality: CC Plateau de Caux

Government
  - Mayor (2026–32): Pierre Escap
- Area^{1}: 5.37 km^{2} (2.07 sq mi)
- Elevation: 130 m (430 ft)
- Highest elevation: 151 m (495 ft)
- Lowest elevation: 95 m (312 ft)
- Population (2023): 430
  - Density: 80/km^{2} (210/sq mi)
- Time zone: UTC+01:00 (CET)
  - Summer (DST): UTC+02:00 (CEST)
- INSEE/Postal code: 76174 /76570
- ^{1} French Land Register data, which excludes lakes, ponds, glaciers > 1 km^{2} (0.386 sq mi or 247 acres) and river estuaries.

Cideville (French pronunciation: [sidvil]) is a commune in the Seine-Maritime department in the Normandy region in northern France.

== Geography ==
A farming village situated in the Pays de Caux, some 21 miles (34 km) northwest of Rouen, at the junction of the D304 and the D263 roads.

== Population ==
Historical population
Year	Pop.	±% p.a.
1968	146	—
1975	166	+1.85%
1982	259	+6.56%
1990	281	+1.02%
1999	276	−0.20%
2007	290	+0.62%
2012	294	+0.27%
2017	386	+5.60%
2023	430	+1.82%
Source: INSEE

== Places of interest ==
- The church of St. Eloi, dating from the twelfth century.

== See also ==
- Communes of the Seine-Maritime department
