= Auzouville-l'Esneval =

Auzouville-l’Esneval
- Commune
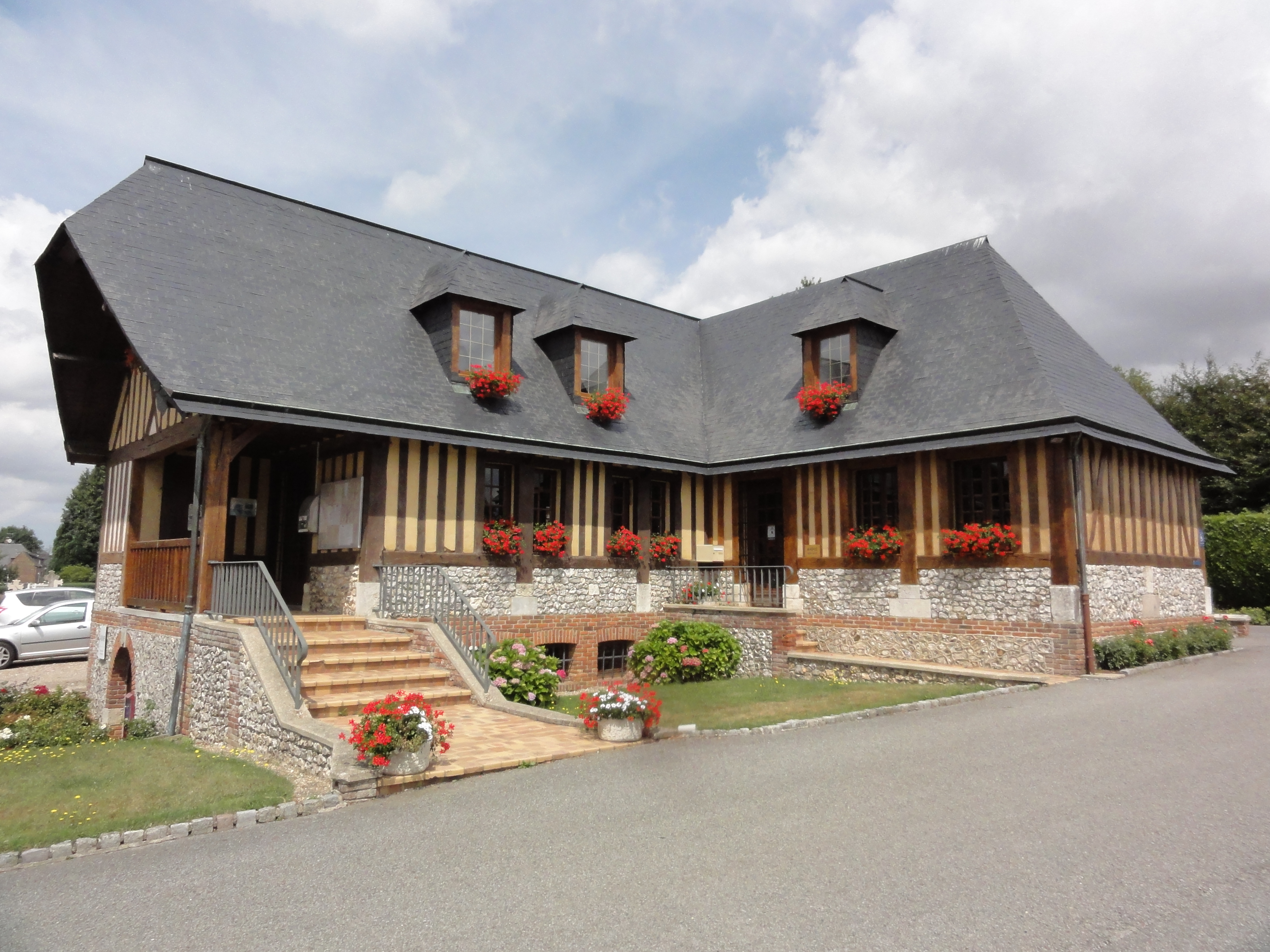
- Town hall

- Coat of arms
- Location of Auzouville-l’Esneval
- Location within France Location within Normandy
- Coordinates: 49°38′33″N 0°53′12″E
- Country: France
- Region: Normandy
- Department: Seine-Maritime
- Arrondissement: Rouen
- Canton: Yvetot
- Intercommunality: CC Plateau de Caux

Government
  - Mayor (2021–2026): Corinne Demottais
- Area^{1}: 5.66 km^{2} (2.19 sq mi)
- Elevation: 165 m (541 ft)
- Highest elevation: 173 m (568 ft)
- Lowest elevation: 129 m (423 ft)
- Population (2023): 361
  - Density: 63.8/km^{2} (165/sq mi)
- Time zone: UTC+01:00 (CET)
  - Summer (DST): UTC+02:00 (CEST)
- INSEE/Postal code: 76045 /76760
- ^{1} French Land Register data, which excludes lakes, ponds, glaciers > 1 km^{2} (0.386 sq mi or 247 acres) and river estuaries.

Auzouville-l’Esneval (French pronunciation: [ozuvil lɛnval]) is a commune in the Seine-Maritime department in the Normandy region in northern France.

== Geography ==
A farming village situated in the Pays de Caux, some 23 miles (37 km) northwest of Rouen at the junction of the D86 and the D263 roads.

== Heraldry ==
Arms of Auzouville-l’Esneval	The arms of Auzouville-l’Esneval are blazoned : Per bend sinister 1: paly Or and azure, a chief gules; 2: Vert, a 'foi' argent. (a 'foi' is two hands fesswise clasped in friendship.

== Population ==
Historical population
Year	Pop.	±% p.a.
1968	190	—
1975	183	−0.53%
1982	260	+5.15%
1990	298	+1.72%
1999	354	+1.93%
2007	332	−0.80%
2012	371	+2.25%
2017	358	−0.71%
2023	361	+0.14%
Source: INSEE

== Places of interest ==
- The church of St. Etienne, dating from the sixteenth century.
- The church of Notre-Dame, dating from the nineteenth century.

== See also ==
- Communes of the Seine-Maritime department
