= Vibeuf =

- Commune
- Location of Vibeuf
- Location within France Location within Normandy
- Coordinates: 49°41′38″N 0°54′20″E
- Country: France
- Region: Normandy
- Department: Seine-Maritime
- Arrondissement: Rouen
- Canton: Yvetot
- Intercommunality: CC Plateau de Caux

Government
  - Mayor (2026–32): Olivier Houdeville
- Area^{1}: 8.66 km^{2} (3.34 sq mi)
- Elevation: 165 m (541 ft)
- Highest elevation: 173 m (568 ft)
- Lowest elevation: 135 m (443 ft)
- Population (2023): 624
  - Density: 72.1/km^{2} (187/sq mi)
- Time zone: UTC+01:00 (CET)
  - Summer (DST): UTC+02:00 (CEST)
- INSEE/Postal code: 76737 /76760
- ^{1} French Land Register data, which excludes lakes, ponds, glaciers > 1 km^{2} (0.386 sq mi or 247 acres) and river estuaries.

Vibeuf (French pronunciation: [vibœf]) is a commune in the Seine-Maritime department in the Normandy region in northern France.

== Geography ==
A farming village situated in the Pays de Caux, some 22 miles (35 km) northwest of Rouen near the junction of the D263 with the D142 road.

== Population ==
Historical population
Year	Pop.	±% p.a.
1968	324	—
1975	294	−1.38%
1982	373	+3.46%
1990	504	+3.83%
1999	533	+0.62%
2007	642	+2.35%
2012	642	+0.00%
2017	608	−1.08%
2023	624	+0.43%
Source: INSEE

== Places of interest ==
- The church of St. Martin, dating from the nineteenth century.
- A medieval fortified manorhouse.

== See also ==
- Communes of the Seine-Maritime department
