= Ancretiéville-Saint-Victor =

- Commune
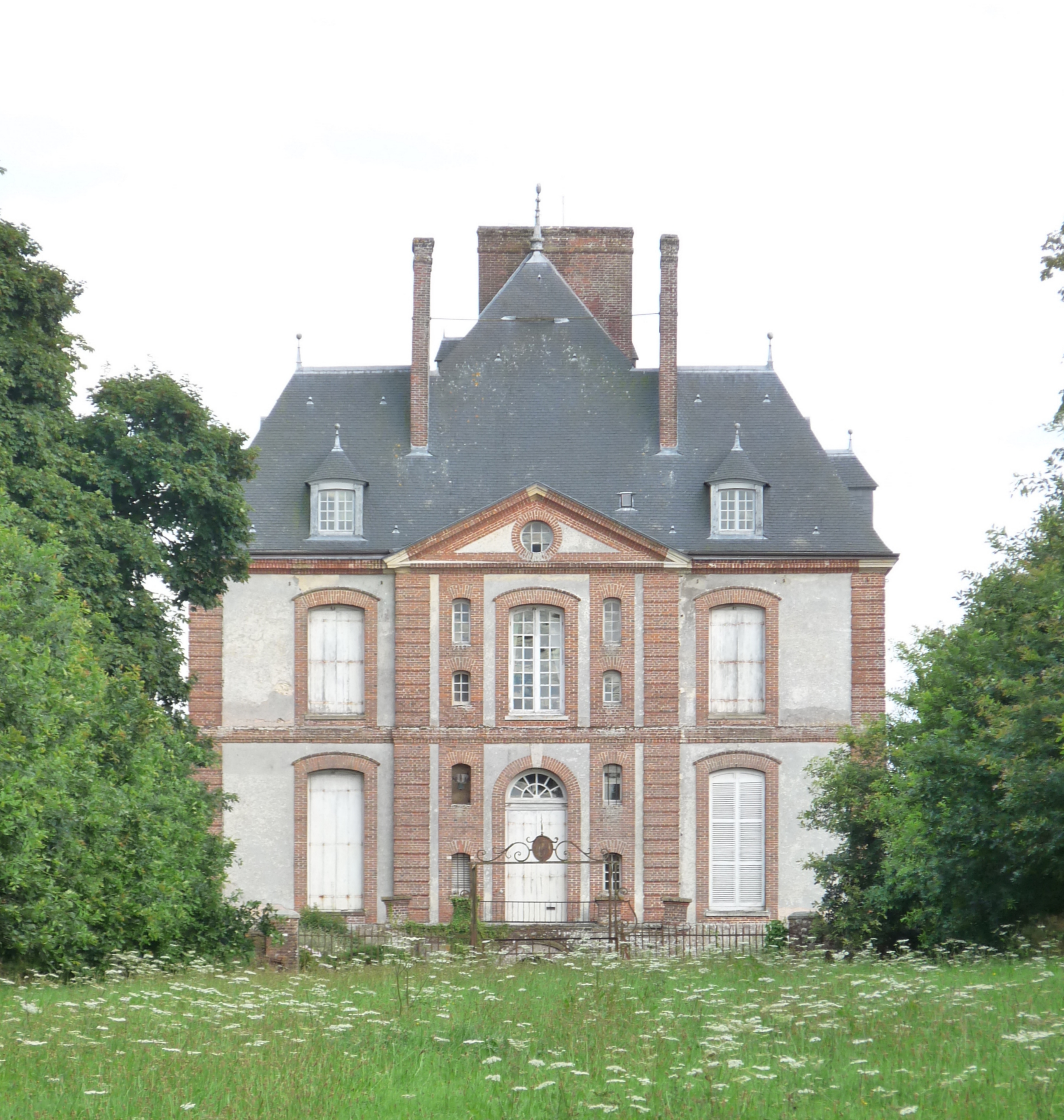
- The chateau of Saint-Victor

- Coat of arms
- Location of Ancretiéville-Saint-Victor
- Location within France Location within Normandy
- Coordinates: 49°39′14″N 0°58′21″E
- Country: France
- Region: Normandy
- Department: Seine-Maritime
- Arrondissement: Rouen
- Canton: Yvetot
- Intercommunality: CC Plateau de Caux

Government
  - Mayor (2020–2026): Didier Decultot
- Area^{1}: 11.54 km^{2} (4.46 sq mi)
- Elevation: 170 m (560 ft)
- Highest elevation: 172 m (564 ft)
- Lowest elevation: 114 m (374 ft)
- Population (2023): 382
  - Density: 33.1/km^{2} (85.7/sq mi)
- Time zone: UTC+01:00 (CET)
  - Summer (DST): UTC+02:00 (CEST)
- INSEE/Postal code: 76010 /76760
- ^{1} French Land Register data, which excludes lakes, ponds, glaciers > 1 km^{2} (0.386 sq mi or 247 acres) and river estuaries.

Ancretiéville-Saint-Victor is a commune in the Seine-Maritime department in the Normandy region in northern France.

== Geography ==
A farming village situated in the Pays de Caux some 17 miles (27 km) north of Rouen at the junction of the D253 and the D103 roads. The A29 autoroute passes through the centre of the commune.

== Population ==
Historical population
Year	Pop.	±% p.a.
1968	267	—
1975	219	−2.79%
1982	277	+3.41%
1990	262	−0.69%
1999	272	+0.42%
2007	339	+2.79%
2012	377	+2.15%
2017	381	+0.21%
2023	382	+0.04%
Source: INSEE

== Places of interest ==
- The church of St. Victor, dating from the nineteenth century.
- The church of St.Pierre, dating from the eleventh century.
- The park and chateau of St. Victor, dating from the eighteenth century.

== See also ==
- Communes of the Seine-Maritime department
