= Étoutteville =

- Commune
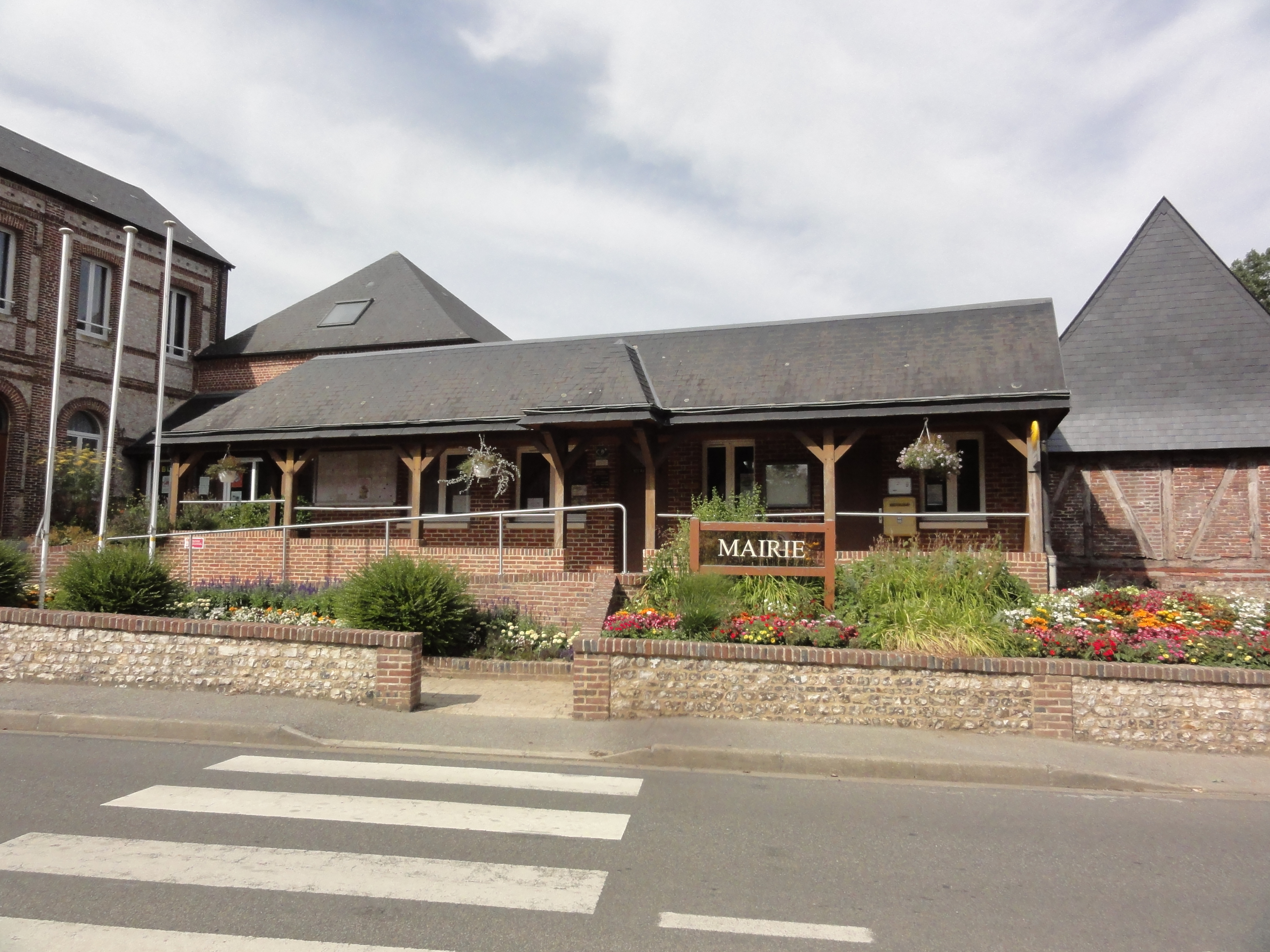
- Town hall

- Coat of arms
- Location of Étoutteville
- Location within France Location within Normandy
- Coordinates: 49°40′39″N 0°47′06″E
- Country: France
- Region: Normandy
- Department: Seine-Maritime
- Arrondissement: Rouen
- Canton: Yvetot
- Intercommunality: CC Plateau de Caux

Government
  - Mayor (2026–32): Michel Fillocque
- Area^{1}: 11.59 km^{2} (4.47 sq mi)
- Elevation: 140 m (460 ft)
- Highest elevation: 160 m (520 ft)
- Lowest elevation: 104 m (341 ft)
- Population (2023): 841
  - Density: 72.6/km^{2} (188/sq mi)
- Time zone: UTC+01:00 (CET)
  - Summer (DST): UTC+02:00 (CEST)
- INSEE/Postal code: 76253 /76190
- ^{1} French Land Register data, which excludes lakes, ponds, glaciers > 1 km^{2} (0.386 sq mi or 247 acres) and river estuaries.

Étoutteville (French pronunciation: [etutvil]) is a commune in the Seine-Maritime department in the Normandy region in northern France.

== Geography ==
A farming village situated in the Pays de Caux, some 23 miles (37 km) southwest of Dieppe at the junction of the D27, D37 and the D53 roads.

== Population ==
Historical population
Year	Pop.	±% p.a.
1968	376	—
1975	372	−0.15%
1982	392	+0.75%
1990	409	+0.53%
1999	439	+0.79%
2007	604	+4.07%
2012	745	+4.29%
2017	807	+1.61%
2023	841	+0.69%
Source: INSEE

== Places of interest ==
- The church of St. Thomas, dating from the thirteenth century.
- The ruins of a feudal castle at Bois-des-Mottes.
- The seventeenth-century château de Plainbosc, with a dovecote.
- The château de Saint-Côme.
- The chapel of Saint-Côme at Etainnemare, built in 1825.

== See also ==
- Communes of the Seine-Maritime department
