= Ouville-l'Abbaye =

- Commune
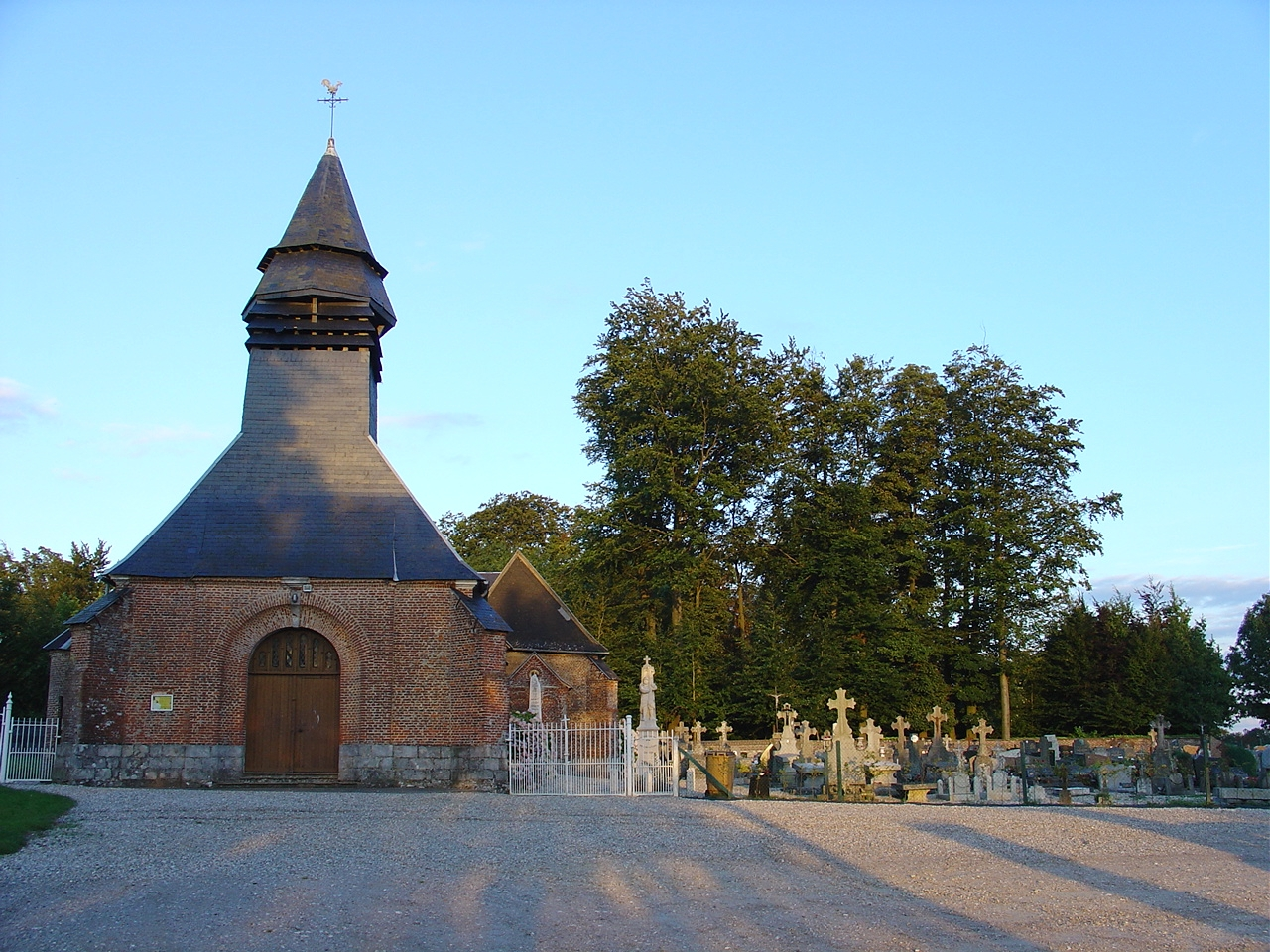
- The church in Ouville-l'Abbaye
- Location of Ouville-l'Abbaye
- Location within France Location within Normandy
- Coordinates: 49°41′44″N 0°51′43″E
- Country: France
- Region: Normandy
- Department: Seine-Maritime
- Arrondissement: Rouen
- Canton: Yvetot
- Intercommunality: CC Plateau de Caux

Government
  - Mayor (2026–32): Jacques Lemercier
- Area^{1}: 7.31 km^{2} (2.82 sq mi)
- Elevation: 165 m (541 ft)
- Highest elevation: 173 m (568 ft)
- Lowest elevation: 134 m (440 ft)
- Population (2023): 649
  - Density: 88.8/km^{2} (230/sq mi)
- Time zone: UTC+01:00 (CET)
  - Summer (DST): UTC+02:00 (CEST)
- INSEE/Postal code: 76491 /76760
- ^{1} French Land Register data, which excludes lakes, ponds, glaciers > 1 km^{2} (0.386 sq mi or 247 acres) and river estuaries.

Ouville-l'Abbaye (French pronunciation: [uvil labei]) is a commune in the Seine-Maritime department in the Normandy region in northern France.

== Geography ==
A farming village situated in the Pays de Caux, some 27 miles (43 km) northwest of Rouen at the junction of the D55 and the D67 roads.

== Population ==
Historical population
Year	Pop.	±% p.a.
1968	285	—
1975	405	+5.15%
1982	483	+2.55%
1990	602	+2.79%
1999	553	−0.94%
2007	621	+1.46%
2012	645	+0.76%
2017	672	+0.82%
2023	649	−0.58%
Source: INSEE

== Places of interest ==
- The church of St.Martin, dating from the seventeenth century.
- The ruins of the seventeenth century abbey.
- Outline of a Roman villa.
- A château in Louis XV style, with many dependant buildings.
- The medieval manorhouse of Mont-de-Bourg.
- Several sixteenth-century buildings.

== See also ==
- Communes of the Seine-Maritime department
