= Routes, Seine-Maritime =

Routes
- Commune
- Location of Routes
- Location within France Location within Normandy
- Coordinates: 49°43′52″N 0°44′40″E
- Country: France
- Region: Normandy
- Department: Seine-Maritime
- Arrondissement: Rouen
- Canton: Yvetot
- Intercommunality: CC Plateau de Caux

Government
  - Mayor (2026–32): Marcel Masson
- Area^{1}: 4.47 km^{2} (1.73 sq mi)
- Elevation: 142 m (466 ft)
- Highest elevation: 149 m (489 ft)
- Lowest elevation: 95 m (312 ft)
- Population (2023): 285
  - Density: 63.8/km^{2} (165/sq mi)
- Time zone: UTC+01:00 (CET)
  - Summer (DST): UTC+02:00 (CEST)
- INSEE/Postal code: 76542 /76560
- ^{1} French Land Register data, which excludes lakes, ponds, glaciers > 1 km^{2} (0.386 sq mi or 247 acres) and river estuaries.

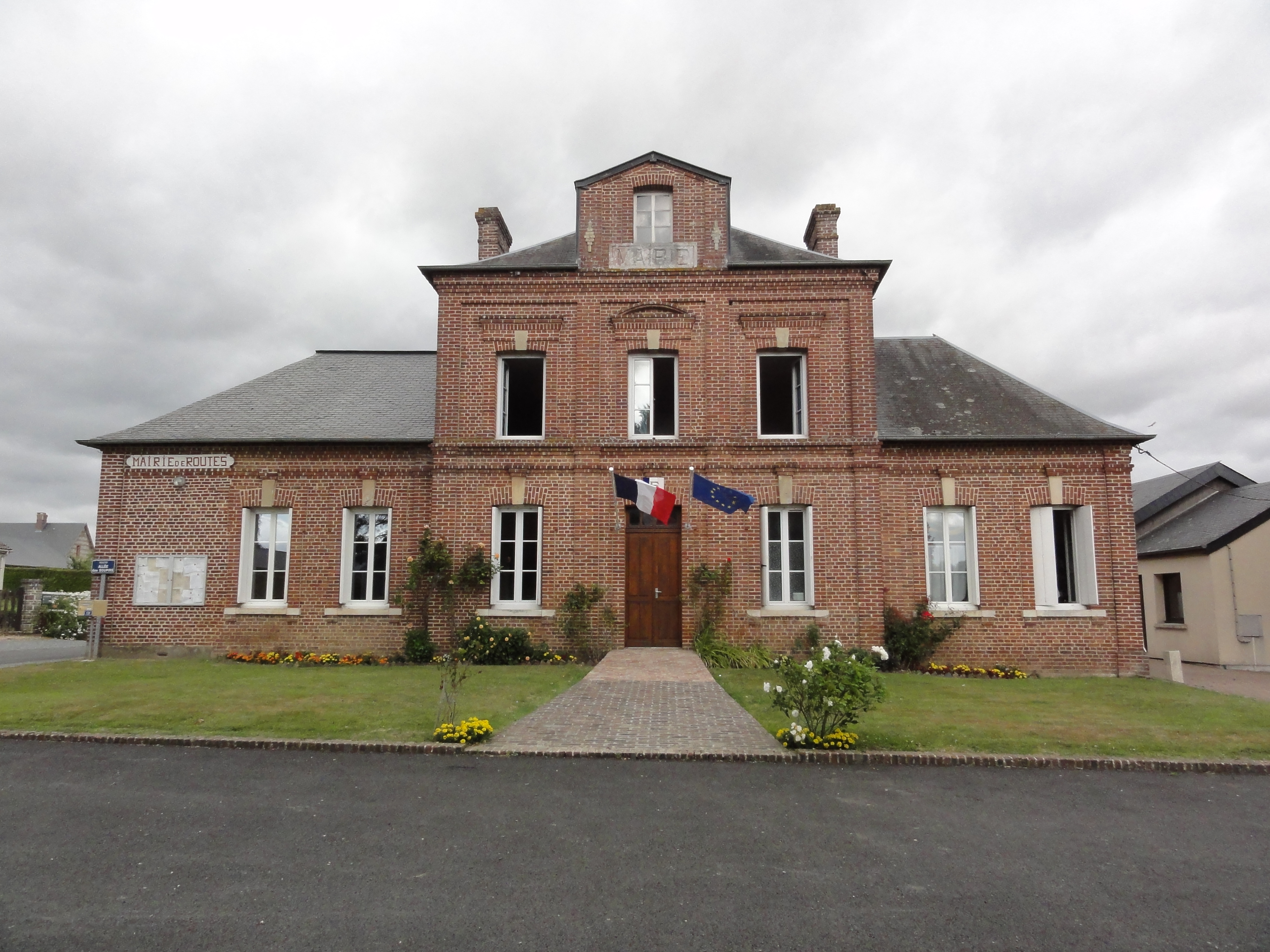
Routes

Routes (French pronunciation: [ʁut]) is a commune in the Seine-Maritime department in the Normandy region in northern France.

== Geography ==
A small farming village in the Pays de Caux, some 33 miles (53 km) northeast of Le Havre, at the junction of the D88 and D420 roads.

== Population ==
Historical population
Year	Pop.	±% p.a.
1968	152	—
1975	143	−0.87%
1982	181	+3.42%
1990	166	−1.08%
1999	177	+0.72%
2007	220	+2.76%
2012	237	+1.50%
2017	273	+2.87%
2023	285	+0.72%
Source: INSEE

== Places of interest ==
- The church of St. Martin-et-Notre-Dame, dating from the eighteenth century.

== See also ==
- Communes of the Seine-Maritime department
