= Flamanville, Seine-Maritime =

Flamanville
- Commune
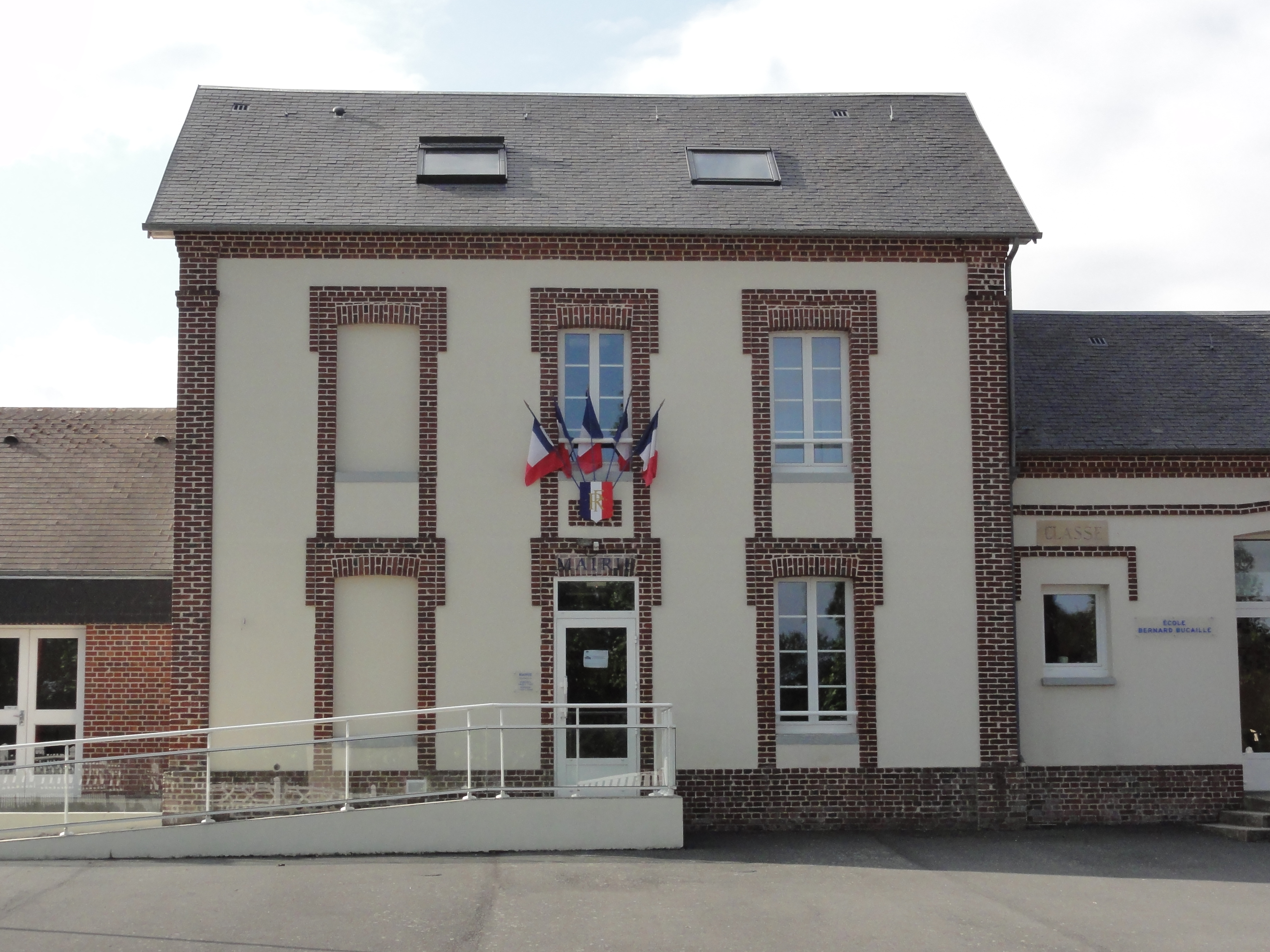
- Town hall
- Location of Flamanville
- Location within France Location within Normandy
- Coordinates: 49°38′00″N 0°50′17″E
- Country: France
- Region: Normandy
- Department: Seine-Maritime
- Arrondissement: Rouen
- Canton: Yvetot
- Intercommunality: CC Plateau de Caux

Government
  - Mayor (2026–32): Alain Petit
- Area^{1}: 4.48 km^{2} (1.73 sq mi)
- Elevation: 143 m (469 ft)
- Highest elevation: 154 m (505 ft)
- Lowest elevation: 137 m (449 ft)
- Population (2023): 462
  - Density: 103/km^{2} (267/sq mi)
- Time zone: UTC+01:00 (CET)
  - Summer (DST): UTC+02:00 (CEST)
- INSEE/Postal code: 76264 /76970
- ^{1} French Land Register data, which excludes lakes, ponds, glaciers > 1 km^{2} (0.386 sq mi or 247 acres) and river estuaries.

Flamanville (French pronunciation: [flamɑ̃vil]) is a commune in the Seine-Maritime department in the Normandy region in northern France.

== Geography ==
A farming village situated in the Pays de Caux, some 21 miles (34 km) northwest of Rouen, at the junction of the D336 and the D929 roads.

== Population ==
Historical population
Year	Pop.	±% p.a.
1968	291	—
1975	254	−1.92%
1982	295	+2.16%
1990	323	+1.14%
1999	343	+0.67%
2007	399	+1.91%
2012	438	+1.88%
2017	492	+2.35%
2023	462	−1.04%
Source: INSEE

== Places of interest ==
- The church of Notre-Dame, dating from the sixteenth century.

== See also ==
- Communes of the Seine-Maritime department
