= Carville-Pot-de-Fer =

- Commune
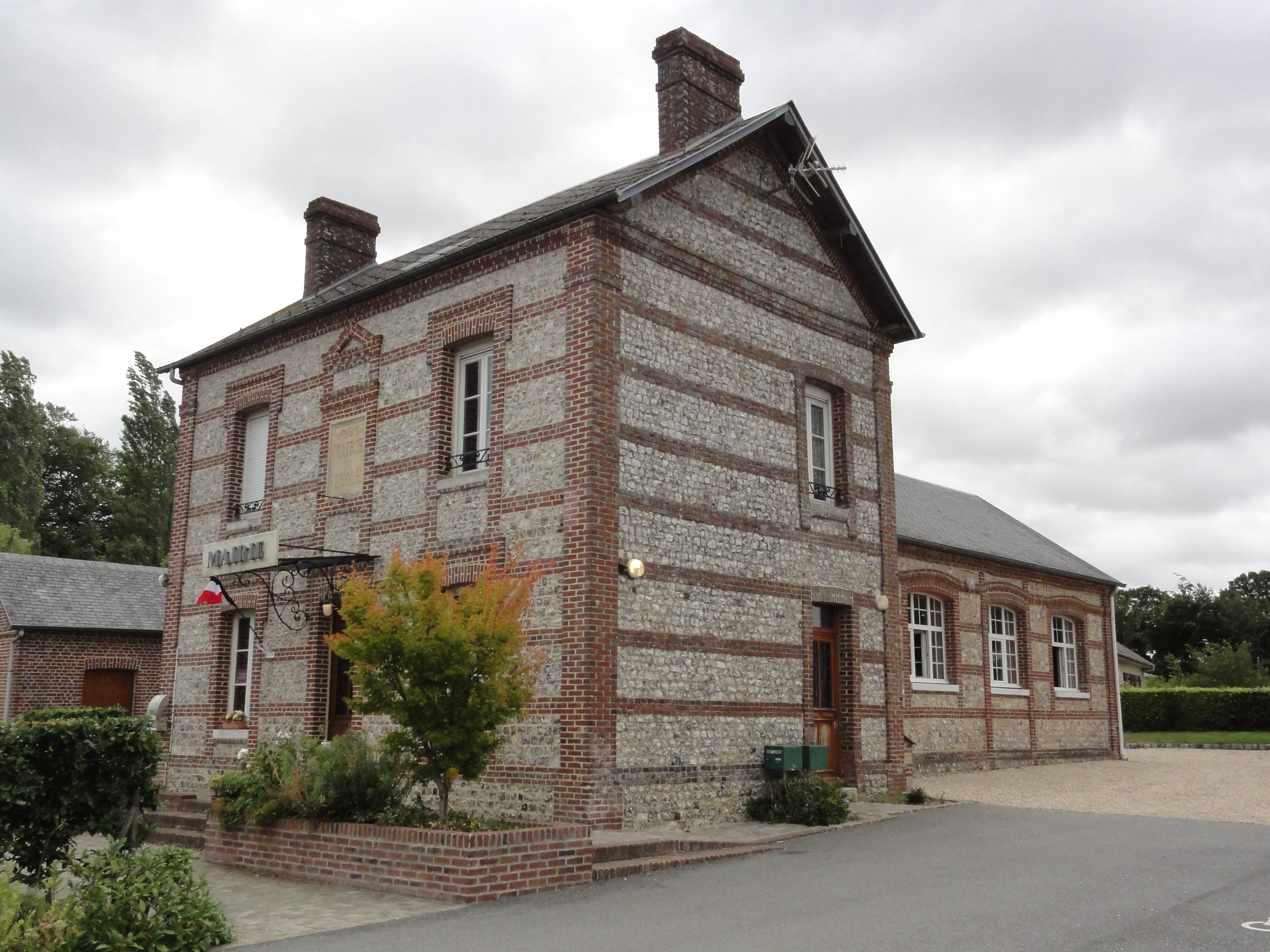
- Carville-Pot-de-Fer (Seine-Mar.) Town hall
- Location of Carville-Pot-de-Fer
- Location within France Location within Normandy
- Coordinates: 49°42′59″N 0°43′28″E
- Country: France
- Region: Normandy
- Department: Seine-Maritime
- Arrondissement: Rouen
- Canton: Yvetot
- Intercommunality: CC Plateau de Caux
- Area^{1}: 5.34 km^{2} (2.06 sq mi)
- Elevation: 120 m (390 ft)
- Highest elevation: 149 m (489 ft)
- Lowest elevation: 82 m (269 ft)
- Population (2023): 108
  - Density: 20.2/km^{2} (52.4/sq mi)
- Time zone: UTC+01:00 (CET)
  - Summer (DST): UTC+02:00 (CEST)
- INSEE/Postal code: 76161 /76560
- ^{1} French Land Register data, which excludes lakes, ponds, glaciers > 1 km^{2} (0.386 sq mi or 247 acres) and river estuaries.

Carville-Pot-de-Fer is a commune in the Seine-Maritime department in the Normandy region in northern France.

== Geography ==
A small farming village situated in the Pays de Caux, some 29 miles (47 km) northeast of Le Havre, near the junction of the D106 and D149 roads.

== Population ==
Historical population
Year	Pop.	±% p.a.
1968	152	—
1975	120	−3.32%
1982	138	+2.02%
1990	113	−2.47%
1999	111	−0.20%
2007	101	−1.17%
2012	110	+1.72%
2017	106	−0.74%
2023	108	+0.31%
Source: INSEE

== Places of interest ==
- The ruins of an 11th-century chapel at the hamlet of Attemesnil.
- The church of St. Hilaire, dating from the twelfth century.

== See also ==
- Communes of the Seine-Maritime department
