= Prétot-Vicquemare =

- Commune
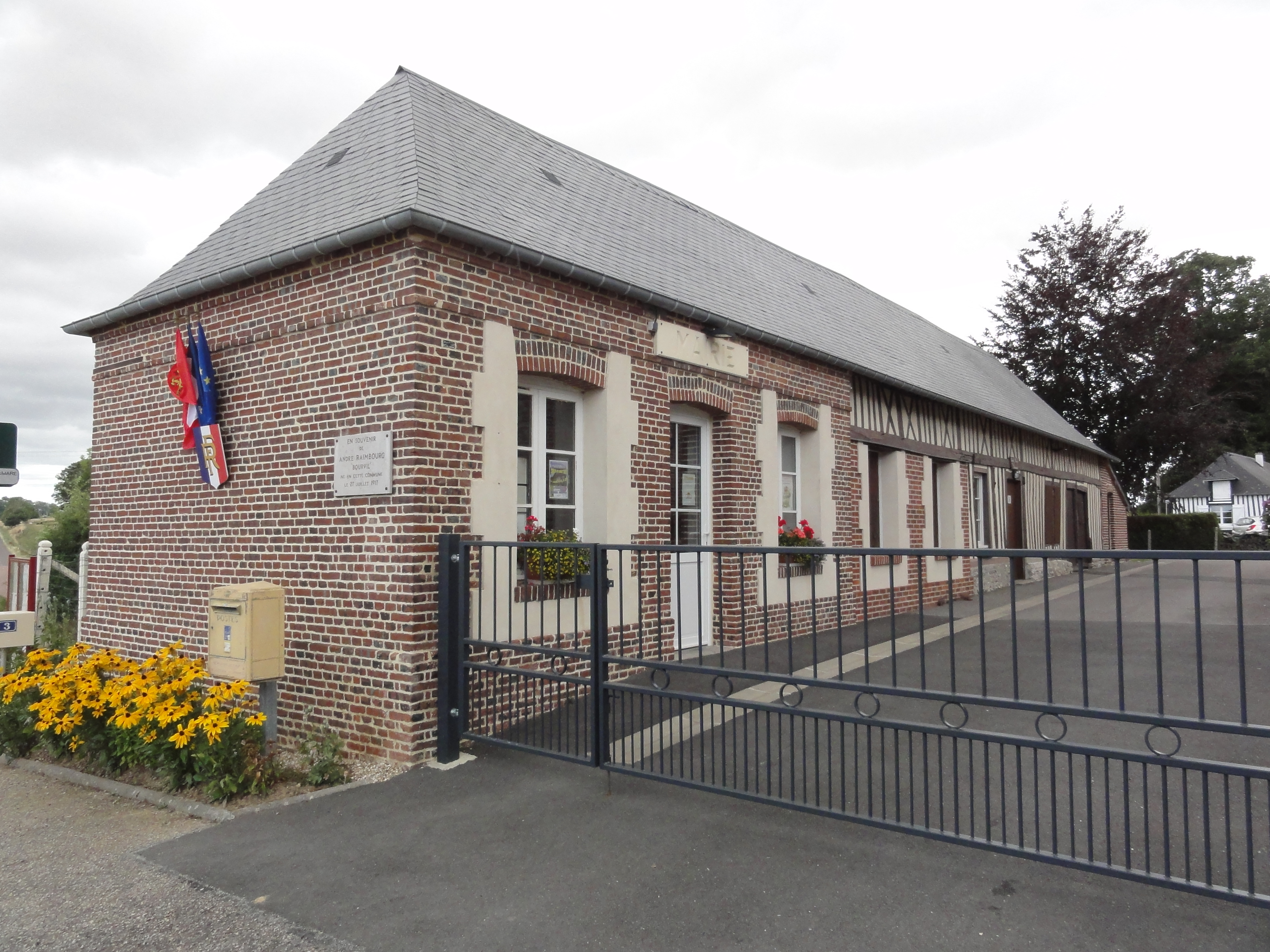
- Location of Prétot-Vicquemare
- Location within France Location within Normandy
- Coordinates: 49°43′54″N 0°51′13″E
- Country: France
- Region: Normandy
- Department: Seine-Maritime
- Arrondissement: Rouen
- Canton: Yvetot
- Intercommunality: CC Plateau de Caux

Government
  - Mayor (2026–32): Francis Truptil
- Area^{1}: 4.73 km^{2} (1.83 sq mi)
- Elevation: 125 m (410 ft)
- Highest elevation: 151 m (495 ft)
- Lowest elevation: 114 m (374 ft)
- Population (2023): 228
  - Density: 48.2/km^{2} (125/sq mi)
- Time zone: UTC+01:00 (CET)
  - Summer (DST): UTC+02:00 (CEST)
- INSEE/Postal code: 76510 /76560
- ^{1} French Land Register data, which excludes lakes, ponds, glaciers > 1 km^{2} (0.386 sq mi or 247 acres) and river estuaries.

Prétot-Vicquemare (French pronunciation: [pʁeto vikmaʁ]) is a commune in the Seine-Maritime department, Normandy, northern France.

== Geography ==
A very small farming village situated in the Pays de Caux, some 25 miles (40 km) northwest of Rouen at the junction of the D25, D27 and the D106 roads.

== Population ==
Historical population
Year	Pop.	±% p.a.
1968	110	—
1975	105	−0.66%
1982	126	+2.64%
1990	125	−0.10%
1999	134	+0.78%
2007	140	+0.55%
2012	184	+5.62%
2017	224	+4.01%
2023	228	+0.30%
Source: INSEE

== Places of interest ==
- The church of St.Pierre, dating from the twelfth century.
- The chapel of Notre-Dame, dating from the seventeenth century.
- The Mottes de Vicquemare.
- Parts of the thirteenth century manorhouse, now a farm.

== People ==
- Andre Raimbourg, French singer and actor, was born here in 1917.

== See also ==
- Communes of the Seine-Maritime department
