= Gonzeville =

- Commune
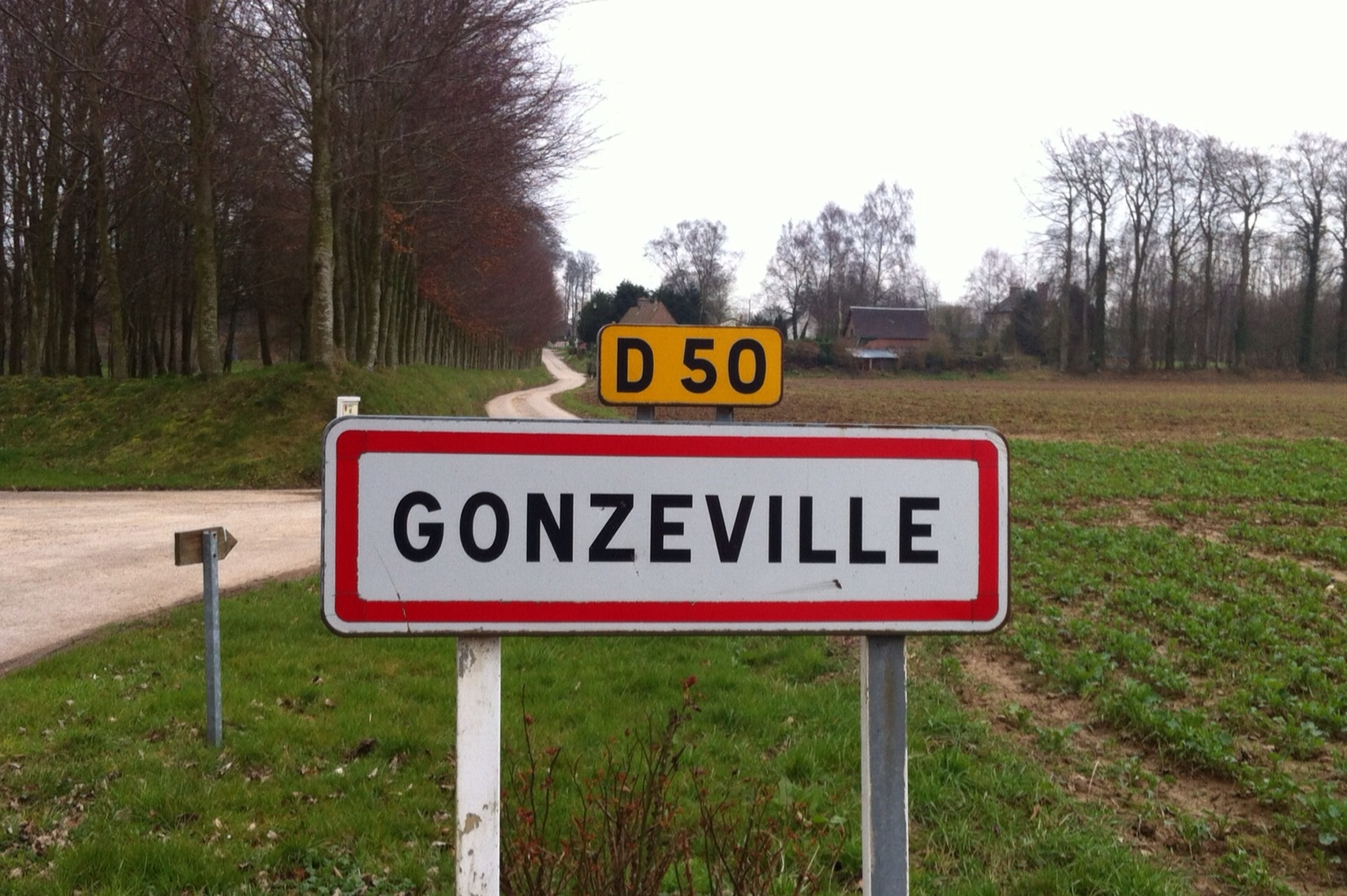
- The road into Gonzeville

- Coat of arms
- Location of Gonzeville
- Location within France Location within Normandy
- Coordinates: 49°45′52″N 0°48′39″E
- Country: France
- Region: Normandy
- Department: Seine-Maritime
- Arrondissement: Rouen
- Canton: Yvetot
- Intercommunality: CC Plateau de Caux

Government
  - Mayor (2026–32): Mathilde Roussel
- Area^{1}: 4.83 km^{2} (1.86 sq mi)
- Elevation: 110 m (360 ft)
- Highest elevation: 144 m (472 ft)
- Lowest elevation: 98 m (322 ft)
- Population (2023): 113
  - Density: 23.4/km^{2} (60.6/sq mi)
- Time zone: UTC+01:00 (CET)
  - Summer (DST): UTC+02:00 (CEST)
- INSEE/Postal code: 76309 /76560
- ^{1} French Land Register data, which excludes lakes, ponds, glaciers > 1 km^{2} (0.386 sq mi or 247 acres) and river estuaries.

Gonzeville (French pronunciation: [ɡɔ̃zvil]) is a commune in the Seine-Maritime department in the Normandy region in northern France.

== Geography ==
A small farming village situated in the Pays de Caux, some 18 miles (29 km) southwest of Dieppe, at the junction of the D50 and the D25 roads.

== Population ==
Historical population
Year	Pop.	±% p.a.
1968	190	—
1975	155	−2.87%
1982	143	−1.14%
1990	123	−1.87%
1999	111	−1.13%
2007	109	−0.23%
2012	103	−1.13%
2017	115	+2.23%
2023	113	−0.29%
Source: INSEE

== Places of interest ==
- The church of St.Samson and St. Cyr, dating from the twelfth century.
- The vestiges of two manor houses dating from the sixteenth century.

== Notable people ==
Valérie Lemercier, (b. 1964) French actress, spent her childhood here.

== See also ==
- Communes of the Seine-Maritime department
