= Fultot =

- Commune
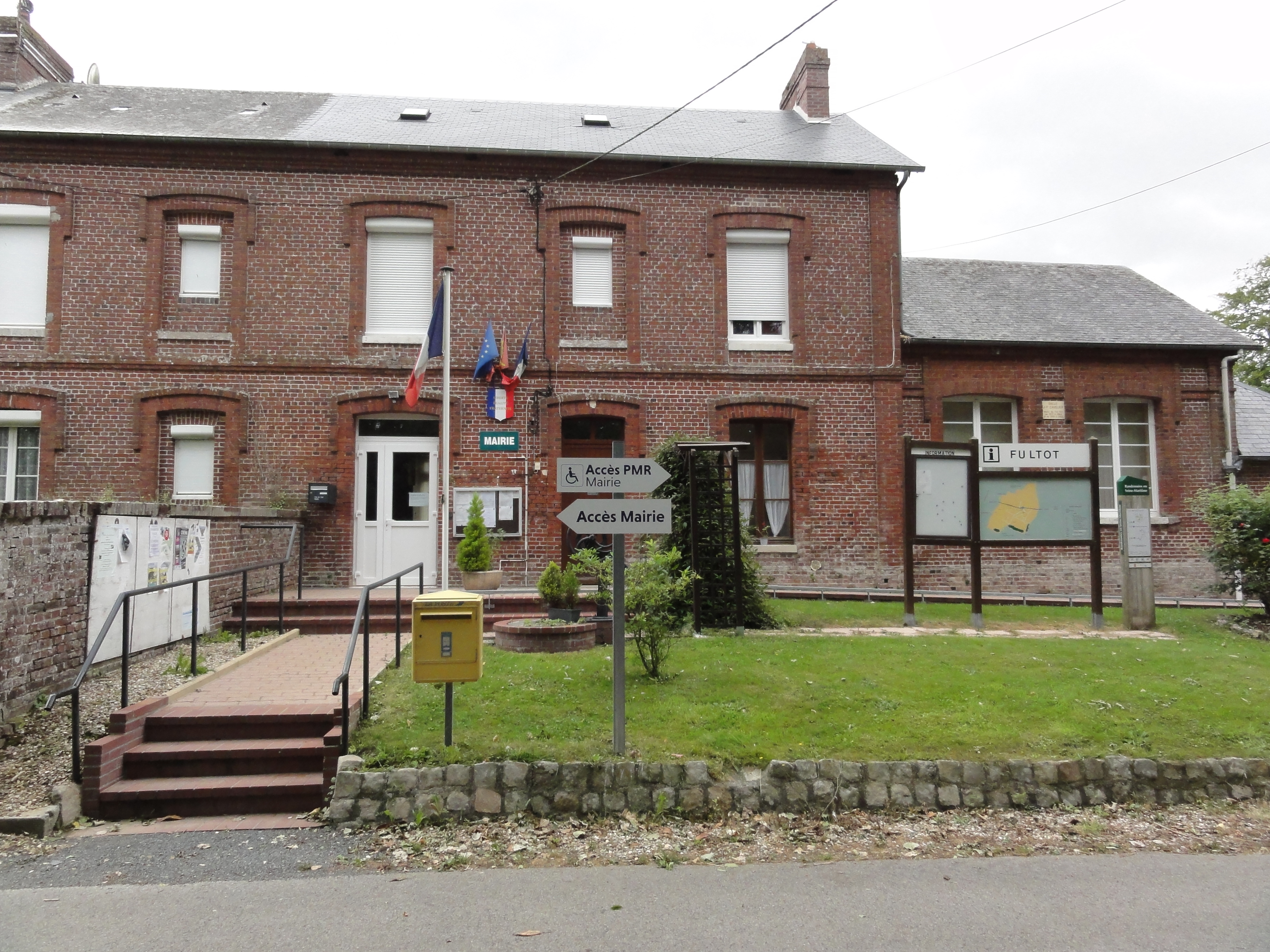
- Fultot Town hall
- Location of Fultot
- Location within France Location within Normandy
- Coordinates: 49°45′27″N 0°47′12″E
- Country: France
- Region: Normandy
- Department: Seine-Maritime
- Arrondissement: Rouen
- Canton: Yvetot
- Intercommunality: CC Plateau de Caux

Government
  - Mayor (2020–2026): Francisca Pouyer
- Area^{1}: 3.72 km^{2} (1.44 sq mi)
- Elevation: 102 m (335 ft)
- Highest elevation: 136 m (446 ft)
- Lowest elevation: 92 m (302 ft)
- Population (2023): 246
  - Density: 66.1/km^{2} (171/sq mi)
- Time zone: UTC+01:00 (CET)
  - Summer (DST): UTC+02:00 (CEST)
- INSEE/Postal code: 76293 /76560
- ^{1} French Land Register data, which excludes lakes, ponds, glaciers > 1 km^{2} (0.386 sq mi or 247 acres) and river estuaries.

Fultot (French pronunciation: [fylto]) is a commune in the Seine-Maritime department in the Normandy region in northern France.

== Geography ==
Fultot is a small farming village situated in the Pays de Caux, some 18 miles (29 km) southwest of Dieppe, at the junction of the D50, D20 and D37 roads. The name probably originates from an Old Norse word meaning "intruders", and in Sweden there is the similarly-named village of "Fulltofta". Several other place-names in Normandy and Brittany are also believed to be derived from Scandinavian words.

== Population ==
Historical population
Year	Pop.	±% p.a.
1968	204	—
1975	174	−2.25%
1982	179	+0.41%
1990	195	+1.08%
1999	179	−0.95%
2007	196	+1.14%
2012	196	+0.00%
2017	220	+2.34%
2023	246	+1.88%
Source: INSEE

== Places of interest ==
- The church of St.Martin, dating from the twelfth century.
- The manor house des Autels, first mentioned in the 13th century.

== See also ==
- Communes of the Seine-Maritime department
