= Boudeville =

- Commune
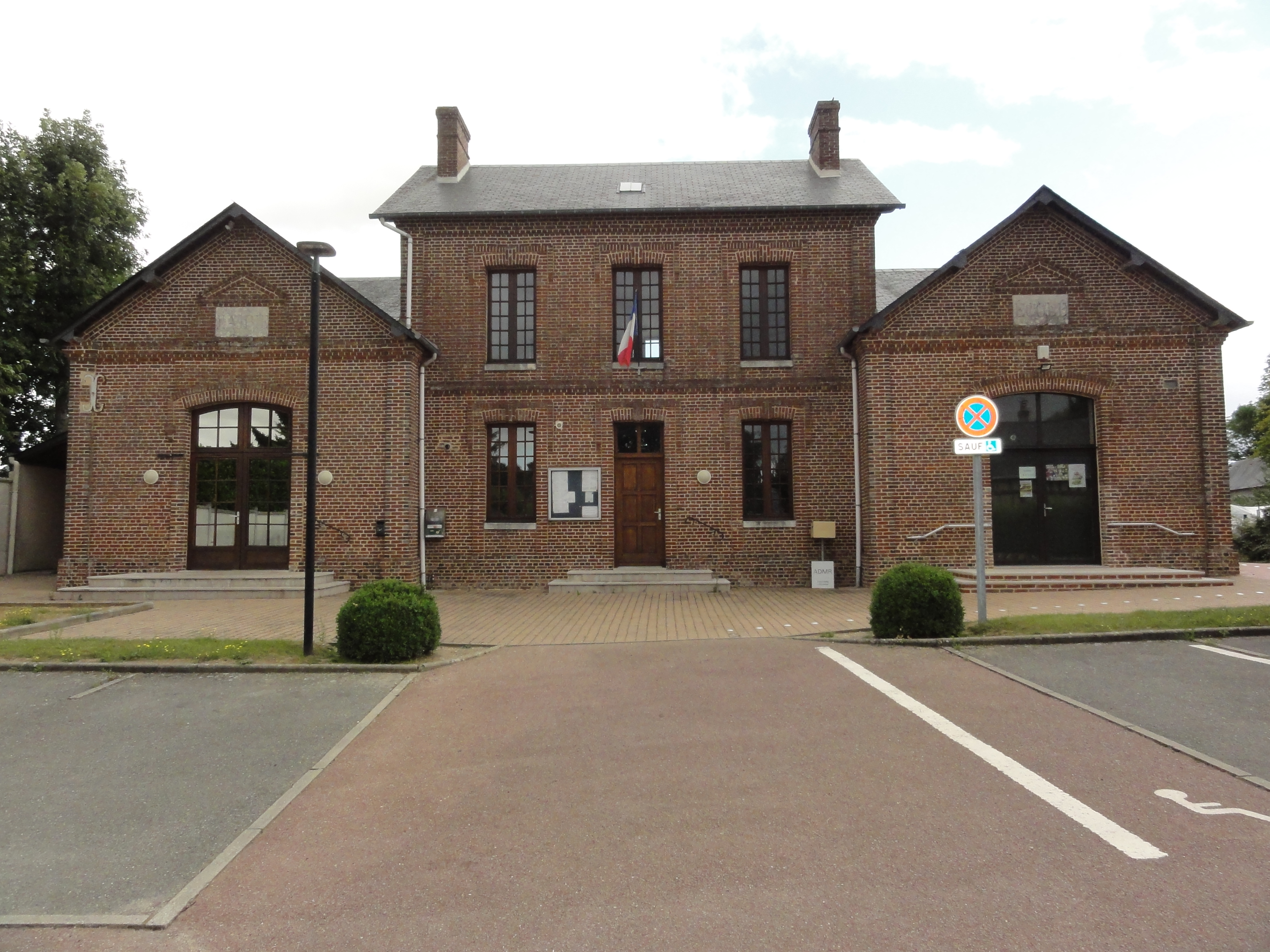
- Boudeville (Seine-Mar.) Town hall
- Location of Boudeville
- Location within France Location within Normandy
- Coordinates: 49°43′35″N 0°52′54″E
- Country: France
- Region: Normandy
- Department: Seine-Maritime
- Arrondissement: Rouen
- Canton: Yvetot
- Intercommunality: CC Plateau de Caux

Government
  - Mayor (2020–2026): Rémi Leconte
- Area^{1}: 4.66 km^{2} (1.80 sq mi)
- Elevation: 150 m (490 ft)
- Highest elevation: 156 m (512 ft)
- Lowest elevation: 123 m (404 ft)
- Population (2023): 217
  - Density: 46.6/km^{2} (121/sq mi)
- Time zone: UTC+01:00 (CET)
  - Summer (DST): UTC+02:00 (CEST)
- INSEE/Postal code: 76129 /76560
- ^{1} French Land Register data, which excludes lakes, ponds, glaciers > 1 km^{2} (0.386 sq mi or 247 acres) and river estuaries.

Boudeville (French pronunciation: [budvil]) is a commune in the Seine-Maritime department in the Normandy region in northern France.

== Geography ==
A small farming village situated in the Pays de Caux some 26 miles (42 km) northwest of Rouen, at the junction of the D106 and the D142 roads.

== Population ==
Historical population
Year	Pop.	±% p.a.
1968	193	—
1975	219	+1.82%
1982	213	−0.40%
1990	171	−2.71%
1999	182	+0.70%
2007	188	+0.41%
2012	213	+2.53%
2017	210	−0.28%
2023	217	+0.55%
Source: INSEE

== Places of interest ==
- The church of St.Pierre, dating from the fourteenth century.

== See also ==
- Communes of the Seine-Maritime department
