= Le Torp-Mesnil =

- Commune
- Location of Le Torp-Mesnil
- Location within France Location within Normandy
- Coordinates: 49°43′08″N 0°53′55″E
- Country: France
- Region: Normandy
- Department: Seine-Maritime
- Arrondissement: Rouen
- Canton: Yvetot
- Intercommunality: CC Plateau de Caux

Government
  - Mayor (2026–32): Philippe Cordier
- Area^{1}: 5.23 km^{2} (2.02 sq mi)
- Elevation: 158 m (518 ft)
- Highest elevation: 160 m (520 ft)
- Lowest elevation: 115 m (377 ft)
- Population (2023): 451
  - Density: 86.2/km^{2} (223/sq mi)
- Time zone: UTC+01:00 (CET)
  - Summer (DST): UTC+02:00 (CEST)
- INSEE/Postal code: 76699 /76560
- ^{1} French Land Register data, which excludes lakes, ponds, glaciers > 1 km^{2} (0.386 sq mi or 247 acres) and river estuaries.

Le Torp-Mesnil is a commune in the Seine-Maritime department in the Normandy region in northern France.

== Geography ==
A farming village situated in the Pays de Caux, some 26 miles (42 km) north of Rouen at the junction of the D55, D25 and the D106 roads.

== Population ==
Historical population
Year	Pop.	±% p.a.
1968	189	—
1975	159	−2.44%
1982	224	+5.02%
1990	263	+2.03%
1999	234	−1.29%
2007	292	+2.81%
2012	373	+5.02%
2017	442	+3.45%
2023	451	+0.34%
Source: INSEE

== Places of interest ==
- The church of St. Henri, dating from the nineteenth century.
- Two sandstone crosses from the seventeenth century.

== See also ==
- Communes of the Seine-Maritime department
