= Bénesville =

- Commune
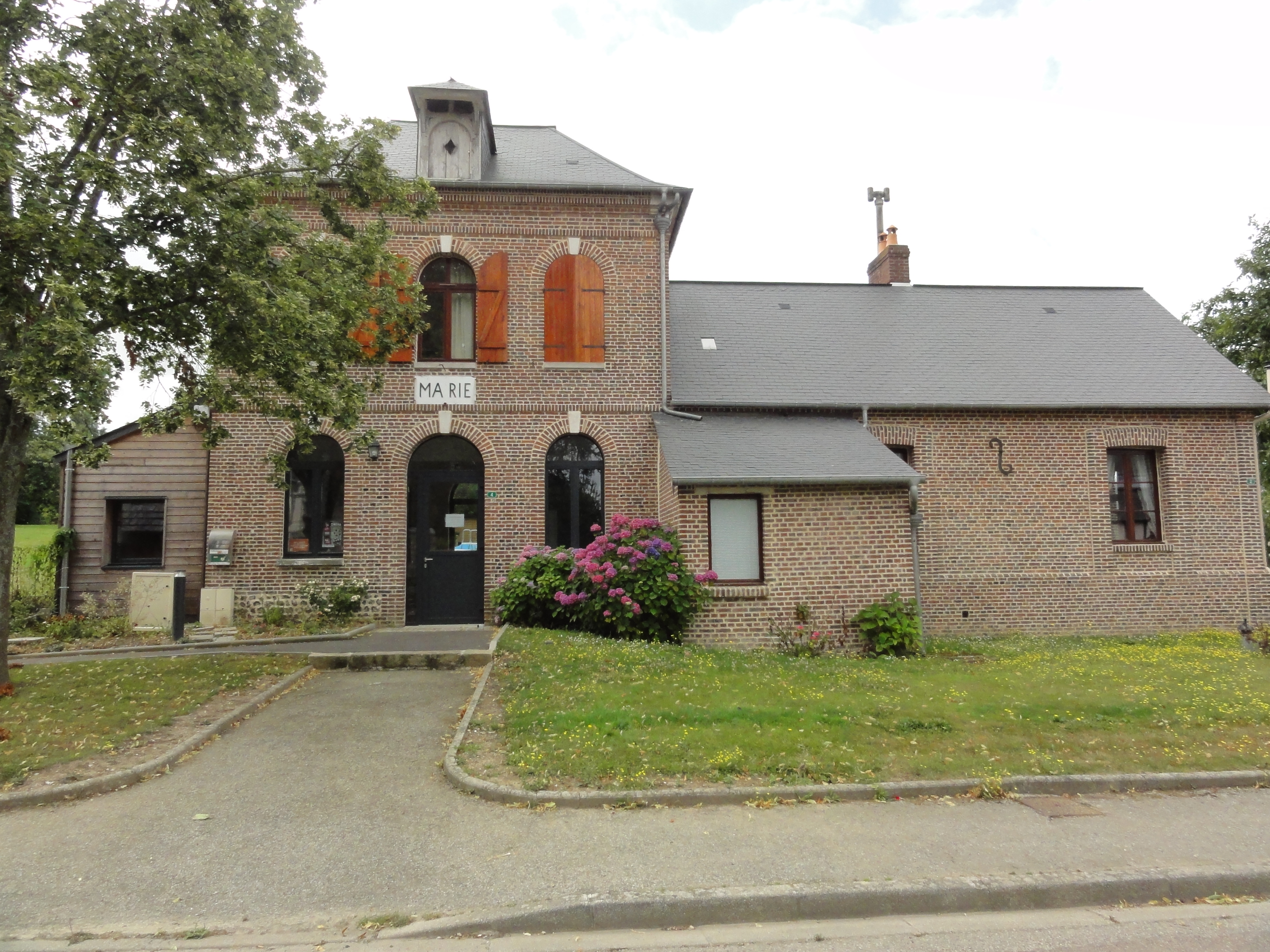
- Bénesville Town hall
- Location of Bénesville
- Location within France Location within Normandy
- Coordinates: 49°45′18″N 0°50′07″E
- Country: France
- Region: Normandy
- Department: Seine-Maritime
- Arrondissement: Rouen
- Canton: Yvetot
- Intercommunality: CC Plateau de Caux

Government
  - Mayor (2026–32): Xavier Cavelan
- Area^{1}: 5.51 km^{2} (2.13 sq mi)
- Elevation: 150 m (490 ft)
- Highest elevation: 148 m (486 ft)
- Lowest elevation: 103 m (338 ft)
- Population (2023): 158
  - Density: 28.7/km^{2} (74.3/sq mi)
- Time zone: UTC+01:00 (CET)
  - Summer (DST): UTC+02:00 (CEST)
- INSEE/Postal code: 76077 /76560
- ^{1} French Land Register data, which excludes lakes, ponds, glaciers > 1 km^{2} (0.386 sq mi or 247 acres) and river estuaries.

Bénesville is a commune in the Seine-Maritime department in the Normandy region in northern France.

== Geography ==
A small farming village situated in the Pays de Caux some 18 miles (29 km) southwest of Dieppe, at the junction of the D25, D89 and the D50 roads.

== Population ==
Historical population
Year	Pop.	±% p.a.
1968	146	—
1975	127	−1.97%
1982	126	−0.11%
1990	134	+0.77%
1999	142	+0.65%
2007	157	+1.26%
2012	192	+4.11%
2017	195	+0.31%
2023	158	−3.45%
Source: INSEE

== Places of interest ==
- The church of Notre-Dame, dating from the thirteenth century.
- A seventeenth-century stone cross.
- Several ancient wood-framed houses.

== See also ==
- Communes of the Seine-Maritime department
