= Étalleville =

- Commune
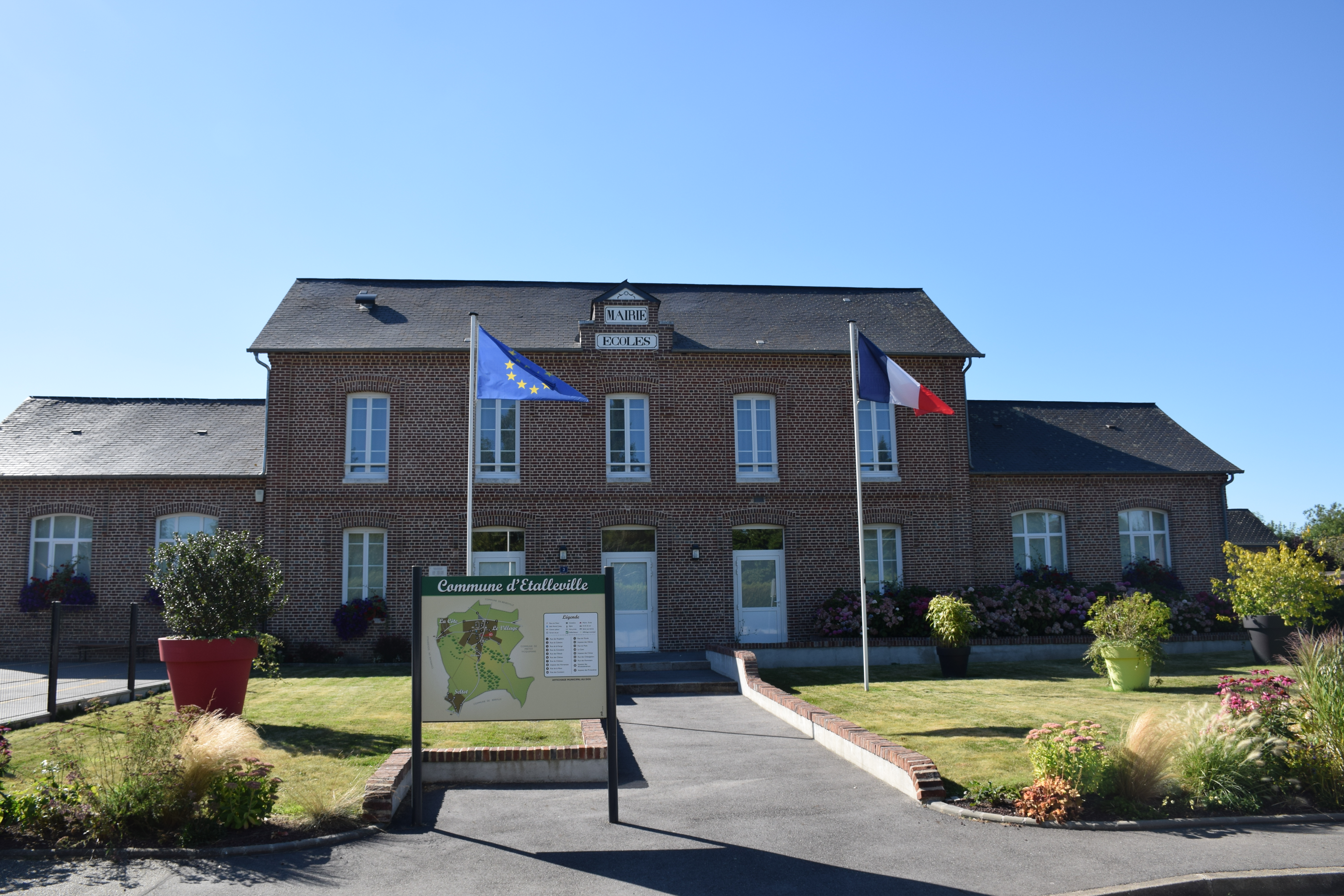
- The town hall in Étalleville
- Location of Étalleville
- Location within France Location within Normandy
- Coordinates: 49°44′20″N 0°49′32″E
- Country: France
- Region: Normandy
- Department: Seine-Maritime
- Arrondissement: Rouen
- Canton: Yvetot
- Intercommunality: CC Plateau de Caux

Government
  - Mayor (2026–32): Clotilde Colley
- Area^{1}: 3.55 km^{2} (1.37 sq mi)
- Elevation: 131 m (430 ft)
- Highest elevation: 152 m (499 ft)
- Lowest elevation: 107 m (351 ft)
- Population (2023): 431
  - Density: 121/km^{2} (314/sq mi)
- Time zone: UTC+01:00 (CET)
  - Summer (DST): UTC+02:00 (CEST)
- INSEE/Postal code: 76251 /76560
- ^{1} French Land Register data, which excludes lakes, ponds, glaciers > 1 km^{2} (0.386 sq mi or 247 acres) and river estuaries.

Étalleville (French pronunciation: [etalvil]) is a commune in the Seine-Maritime department in the Normandy region in northern France.

== Geography ==
A farming village situated in the Pays de Caux, some 20 miles (32 km) southwest of Dieppe at the junction of the D149 and the D89 road.

== Population ==
Historical population
Year	Pop.	±% p.a.
1968	184	—
1975	234	+3.49%
1982	383	+7.29%
1990	371	−0.40%
1999	364	−0.21%
2007	418	+1.74%
2012	447	+1.35%
2017	454	+0.31%
2023	431	−0.86%
Source: INSEE

== Places of interest ==
- The church of St. Gratien, dating from the nineteenth century.

== See also ==
- Communes of the Seine-Maritime department
