= Berville-en-Caux =

- Commune
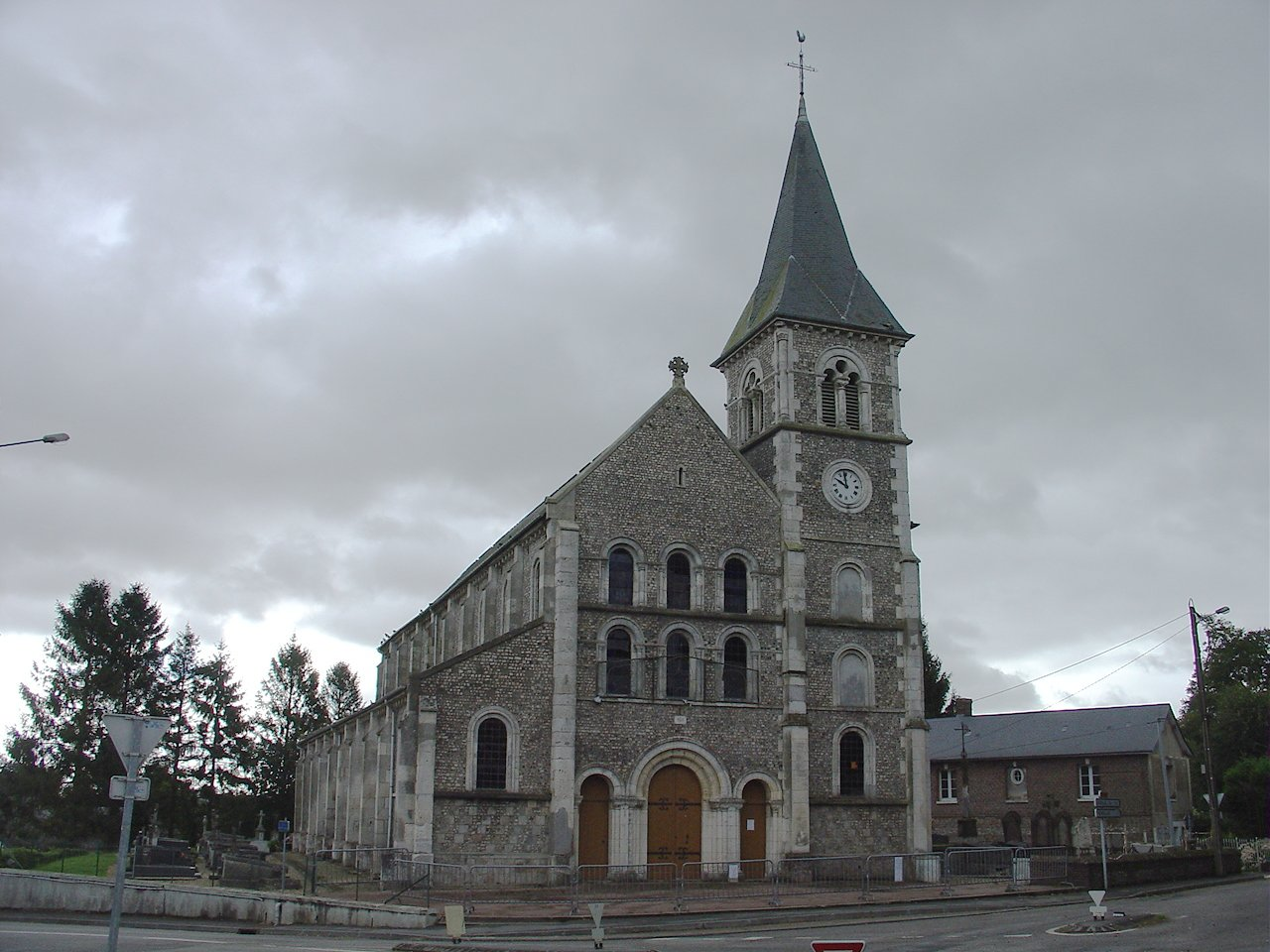
- The church in Berville
- Location of Berville-en-Caux
- Location within France Location within Normandy
- Coordinates: 49°42′36″N 0°50′00″E
- Country: France
- Region: Normandy
- Department: Seine-Maritime
- Arrondissement: Rouen
- Canton: Yvetot
- Intercommunality: CC Plateau de Caux

Government
  - Mayor (2026–32): François-Marie Léger
- Area^{1}: 6.72 km^{2} (2.59 sq mi)
- Elevation: 150 m (490 ft)
- Highest elevation: 164 m (538 ft)
- Lowest elevation: 123 m (404 ft)
- Population (2023): 698
  - Density: 104/km^{2} (269/sq mi)
- Time zone: UTC+01:00 (CET)
  - Summer (DST): UTC+02:00 (CEST)
- INSEE/Postal code: 76087 /76560
- ^{1} French Land Register data, which excludes lakes, ponds, glaciers > 1 km^{2} (0.386 sq mi or 247 acres) and river estuaries.

Berville-en-Caux (French pronunciation: [bɛʁvil ɑ̃ ko], literally Berville in Caux; before 2017: Berville) is a commune in the Seine-Maritime department in the Normandy region in north-western France.

== Geography ==
A farming village situated in the Pays de Caux, some 30 miles (48 km) northwest of Rouen, at the junction of the D67 and the D27 roads.

== Population ==
Historical population
| Year | Pop. | ±% p.a. |
|---|---|---|
| 1968 | 380 | — |
| 1975 | 411 | +1.13% |
| 1982 | 419 | +0.28% |
| 1990 | 473 | +1.53% |
| 1999 | 480 | +0.16% |
| 2007 | 542 | +1.53% |
| 2012 | 574 | +1.15% |
| 2017 | 649 | +2.49% |
| 2023 | 698 | +1.22% |
Source: INSEE

== Places of interest ==
- The church of Saint-Wandrille, dating from the nineteenth century.
- The eighteenth century chapel of Saint-Gilles.

== See also ==
- Communes of the Seine-Maritime department
