= Harcanville =

- Commune
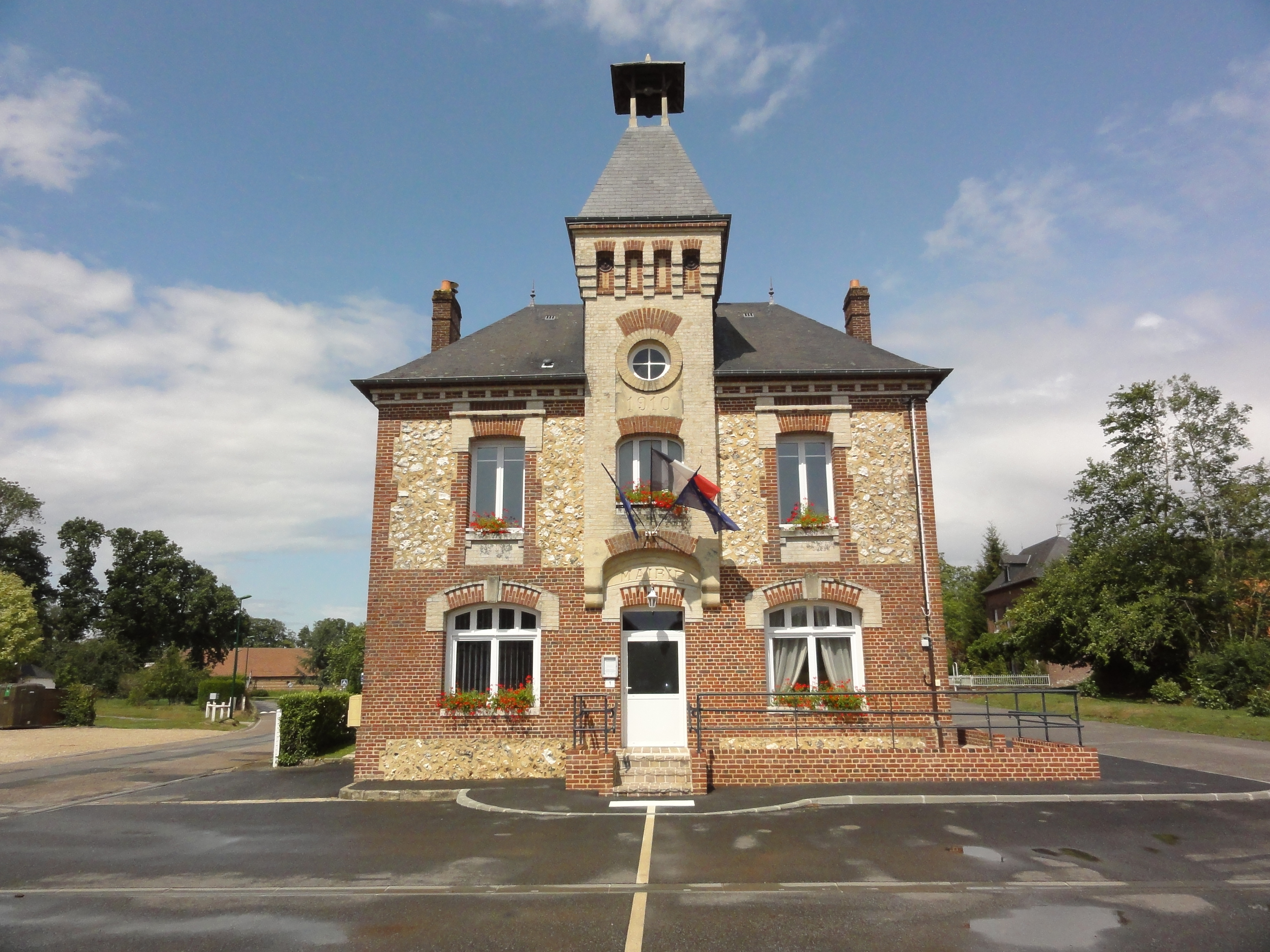
- Town hall
- Location of Harcanville
- Location within France Location within Normandy
- Coordinates: 49°42′54″N 0°45′21″E
- Country: France
- Region: Normandy
- Department: Seine-Maritime
- Arrondissement: Rouen
- Canton: Yvetot
- Intercommunality: CC Plateau de Caux

Government
  - Mayor (2020–2026): Jean-Pierre Langlois
- Area^{1}: 7.48 km^{2} (2.89 sq mi)
- Elevation: 130 m (430 ft)
- Highest elevation: 156 m (512 ft)
- Lowest elevation: 108 m (354 ft)
- Population (2023): 522
  - Density: 69.8/km^{2} (181/sq mi)
- Time zone: UTC+01:00 (CET)
  - Summer (DST): UTC+02:00 (CEST)
- INSEE/Postal code: 76340 /76560
- ^{1} French Land Register data, which excludes lakes, ponds, glaciers > 1 km^{2} (0.386 sq mi or 247 acres) and river estuaries.

Harcanville (French pronunciation: [aʁkɑ̃vil]) is a commune in the Seine-Maritime department in the Normandy region in northern France.

== Geography ==
A farming village situated in the Pays de Caux some 28 miles (45 km) northwest of Rouen, at the junction of the D149 and the D110 roads. It is very close to the section of Secantan.

== Population ==
Historical population
Year	Pop.	±% p.a.
1968	411	—
1975	419	+0.28%
1982	440	+0.70%
1990	384	−1.69%
1999	403	+0.54%
2007	442	+1.16%
2012	495	+2.29%
2017	510	+0.60%
2023	522	+0.39%
Source: INSEE

== Places of interest ==
- The church of St.Jean & St.Clair, dating from the eleventh century.
- A feudal motte.
- A sixteenth-century fortified manor house, now part of a farm.
- The eighteenth-century Manoir de Pichemont.

== See also ==
- Communes of the Seine-Maritime department
