= Saint-Laurent-en-Caux =

- Commune
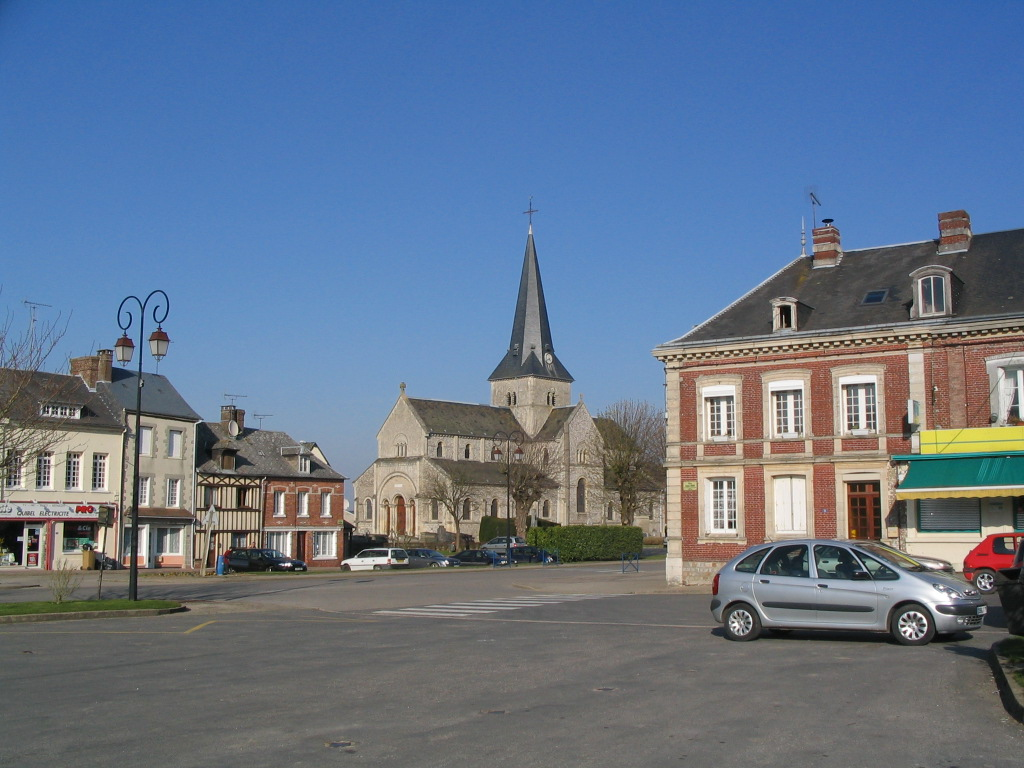
- The town hall square and church in Saint-Laurent-en-Caux
- Location of Saint-Laurent-en-Caux
- Location within France Location within Normandy
- Coordinates: 49°45′06″N 0°52′53″E
- Country: France
- Region: Normandy
- Department: Seine-Maritime
- Arrondissement: Rouen
- Canton: Yvetot
- Intercommunality: CC Plateau de Caux

Government
  - Mayor (2026–32): Agnès Laloi
- Area^{1}: 6.46 km^{2} (2.49 sq mi)
- Elevation: 146 m (479 ft)
- Highest elevation: 156 m (512 ft)
- Lowest elevation: 95 m (312 ft)
- Population (2023): 708
  - Density: 110/km^{2} (284/sq mi)
- Time zone: UTC+01:00 (CET)
  - Summer (DST): UTC+02:00 (CEST)
- INSEE/Postal code: 76597 /76560
- ^{1} French Land Register data, which excludes lakes, ponds, glaciers > 1 km^{2} (0.386 sq mi or 247 acres) and river estuaries.

Saint-Laurent-en-Caux (French pronunciation: [sɛ̃ lɔʁɑ̃ ɑ̃ ko], lit. 'Saint Laurent in Caux') is a commune in the Seine-Maritime department in the Normandy region in northern France.

== Geography ==
A farming village situated in the Pays de Caux, some 20 miles (32 km) southwest of Dieppe at the junction of the D142, D149 and the D50 roads.

== Population ==
Historical population
Year	Pop.	±% p.a.
1968	588	—
1975	601	+0.31%
1982	640	+0.90%
1990	725	+1.57%
1999	732	+0.11%
2007	803	+1.16%
2012	770	−0.84%
2017	771	+0.03%
2023	708	−1.41%
Source: INSEE

== Places of interest ==
- The church of St.Laurent, dating from the nineteenth century.
- The remains of a feudal castle.
- A sixteenth century sandstone cross in the cemetery.
- Two 16th century manorhouses.

== See also ==
- Communes of the Seine-Maritime department
