= Reuville =

- Commune
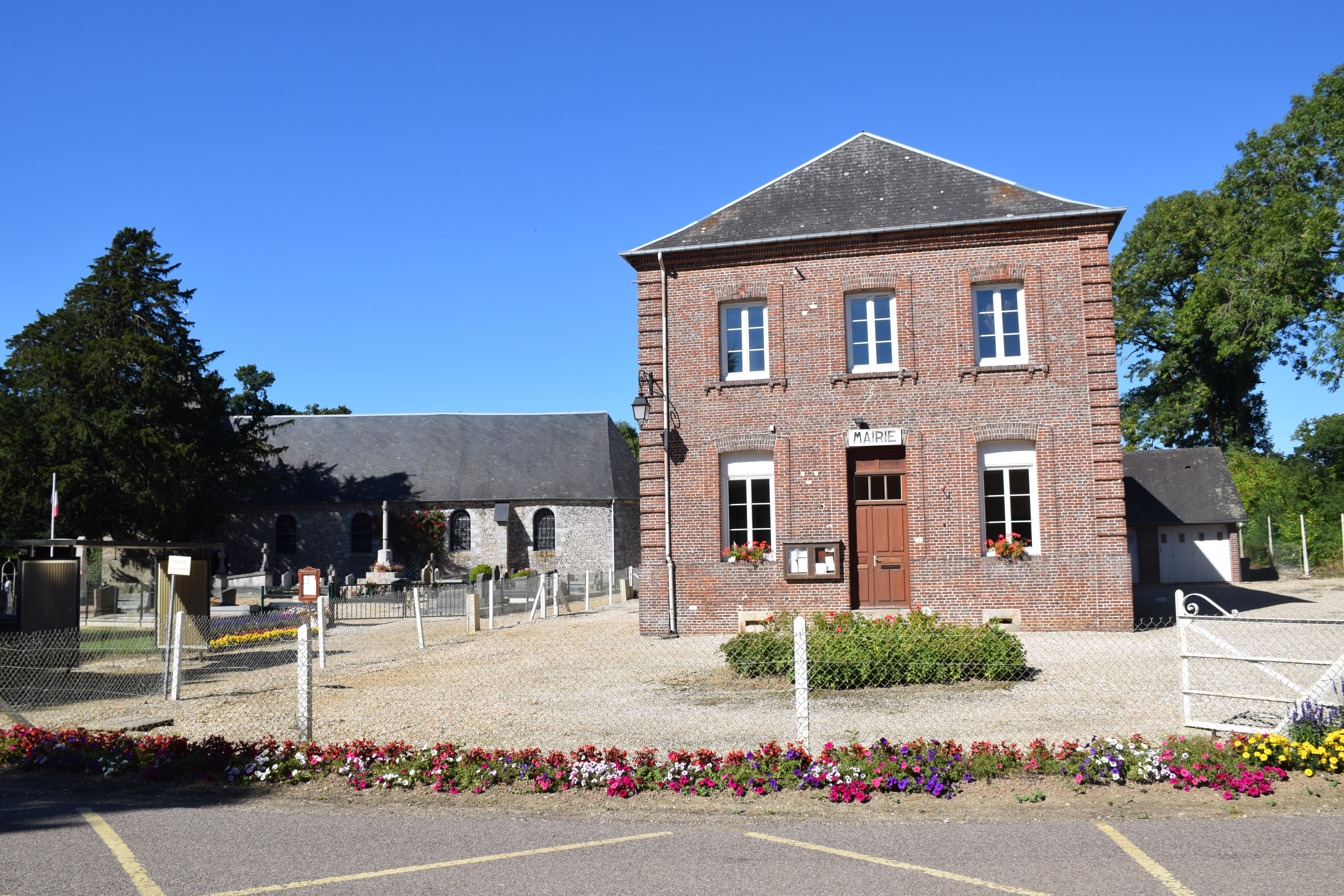
- The town hall and church in Reuville
- Location of Reuville
- Location within France Location within Normandy
- Coordinates: 49°45′06″N 0°52′07″E
- Country: France
- Region: Normandy
- Department: Seine-Maritime
- Arrondissement: Rouen
- Canton: Yvetot
- Intercommunality: CC Plateau de Caux

Government
  - Mayor (2026–32): Gérard Tiercelin
- Area^{1}: 4.37 km^{2} (1.69 sq mi)
- Elevation: 143 m (469 ft)
- Highest elevation: 152 m (499 ft)
- Lowest elevation: 117 m (384 ft)
- Population (2023): 152
  - Density: 34.8/km^{2} (90.1/sq mi)
- Time zone: UTC+01:00 (CET)
  - Summer (DST): UTC+02:00 (CEST)
- INSEE/Postal code: 76524 /76560
- ^{1} French Land Register data, which excludes lakes, ponds, glaciers > 1 km^{2} (0.386 sq mi or 247 acres) and river estuaries.

Reuville (French pronunciation: [ʁøvil]) is a commune in the Seine-Maritime department in the Normandy region in northern France.

== Geography ==
A small farming village situated in the Pays de Caux, some 27 miles (43 km) north of Rouen at the junction of the D50 and the D149 roads.

== Population ==
Historical population
Year	Pop.	±% p.a.
1968	125	—
1975	110	−1.81%
1982	105	−0.66%
1990	121	+1.79%
1999	116	−0.47%
2007	117	+0.11%
2012	129	+1.97%
2017	123	−0.95%
2023	152	+3.59%
Source: INSEE

== Places of interest ==
- The church of St.Pierre & St.Paul, dating from the seventeenth century.

== See also ==
- Communes of the Seine-Maritime department
