= Bretteville-Saint-Laurent =

- Commune
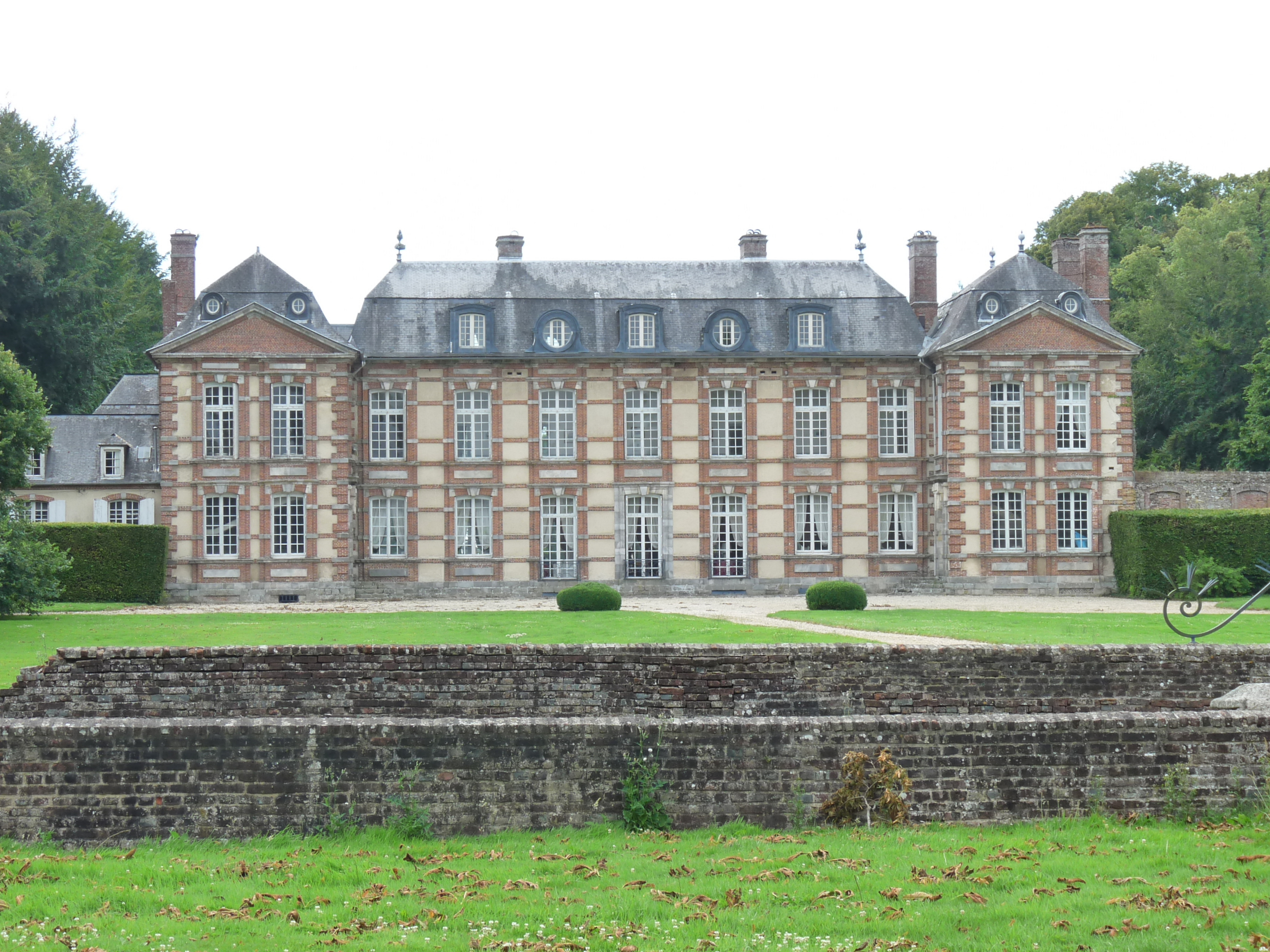
- The chateau in Bretteville-Saint-Laurent
- Location of Bretteville-Saint-Laurent
- Location within France Location within Normandy
- Coordinates: 49°45′50″N 0°52′32″E
- Country: France
- Region: Normandy
- Department: Seine-Maritime
- Arrondissement: Rouen
- Canton: Yvetot
- Intercommunality: CC Plateau de Caux

Government
  - Mayor (2020–2026): Philippe Coté
- Area^{1}: 3.97 km^{2} (1.53 sq mi)
- Elevation: 145 m (476 ft)
- Highest elevation: 140 m (460 ft)
- Lowest elevation: 95 m (312 ft)
- Population (2023): 163
  - Density: 41.1/km^{2} (106/sq mi)
- Time zone: UTC+01:00 (CET)
  - Summer (DST): UTC+02:00 (CEST)
- INSEE/Postal code: 76144 /76560
- ^{1} French Land Register data, which excludes lakes, ponds, glaciers > 1 km^{2} (0.386 sq mi or 247 acres) and river estuaries.

Bretteville-Saint-Laurent (French pronunciation: [bʁɛtvil sɛ̃ loʁɑ̃]) is a commune in the Seine-Maritime department in the Normandy region in northern France.

== Geography ==
A small farming village situated in the Pays de Caux some 19 miles (31 km) southwest of Dieppe, at the junction of the D107, D142 and the D103 roads.

== Population ==
Historical population
Year	Pop.	±% p.a.
1968	135	—
1975	136	+0.11%
1982	169	+3.15%
1990	186	+1.21%
1999	183	−0.18%
2007	165	−1.29%
2012	181	+1.87%
2017	159	−2.56%
2023	163	+0.41%
Source: INSEE

== Places of interest ==
- The church of Notre-Dame, dating from the thirteenth century.
- An eighteenth-century chateau.

== See also ==
- Communes of the Seine-Maritime department
