= Yvecrique =

- Commune
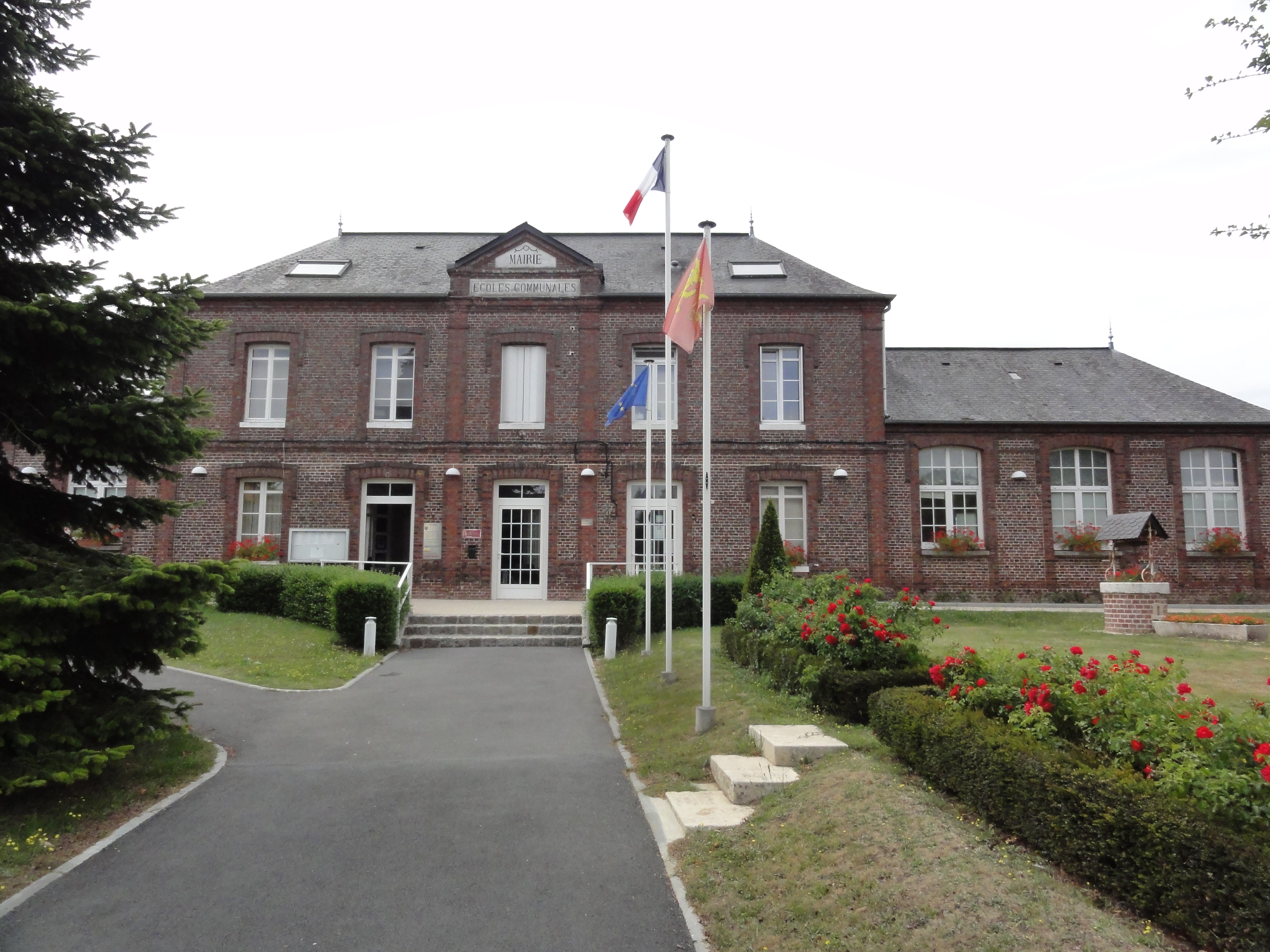
- Town hall

- Coat of arms
- Location of Yvecrique
- Location within France Location within Normandy
- Coordinates: 49°41′17″N 0°48′40″E
- Country: France
- Region: Normandy
- Department: Seine-Maritime
- Arrondissement: Rouen
- Canton: Yvetot
- Intercommunality: CC Plateau de Caux

Government
  - Mayor (2026–32): Jackie Marcatté
- Area^{1}: 5.97 km^{2} (2.31 sq mi)
- Elevation: 155 m (509 ft)
- Highest elevation: 167 m (548 ft)
- Lowest elevation: 129 m (423 ft)
- Population (2023): 623
  - Density: 104/km^{2} (270/sq mi)
- Time zone: UTC+01:00 (CET)
  - Summer (DST): UTC+02:00 (CEST)
- INSEE/Postal code: 76757 /76560
- ^{1} French Land Register data, which excludes lakes, ponds, glaciers > 1 km^{2} (0.386 sq mi or 247 acres) and river estuaries.

Yvecrique is a commune in the Seine-Maritime department in the Normandy region in northern France.

== Geography ==
A farming village situated in the Pays de Caux, some 25 miles (40 km) northwest of Rouen near the junction of the D27 with the D20 road.

== Population ==
Historical population
| Year | Pop. | ±% p.a. |
|---|---|---|
| 1968 | 220 | — |
| 1975 | 195 | −1.71% |
| 1982 | 448 | +12.62% |
| 1990 | 649 | +4.74% |
| 1999 | 635 | −0.24% |
| 2007 | 646 | +0.21% |
| 2012 | 665 | +0.58% |
| 2017 | 644 | −0.64% |
| 2023 | 623 | −0.55% |
Source: INSEE

== Places of interest ==
- The church of St. Aubin, dating from the fourteenth century.
- A chapel dating from the eighteenth century.

== See also ==
- Communes of the Seine-Maritime department
