= Édouard de Bergevin =

French painter (1861–1925)

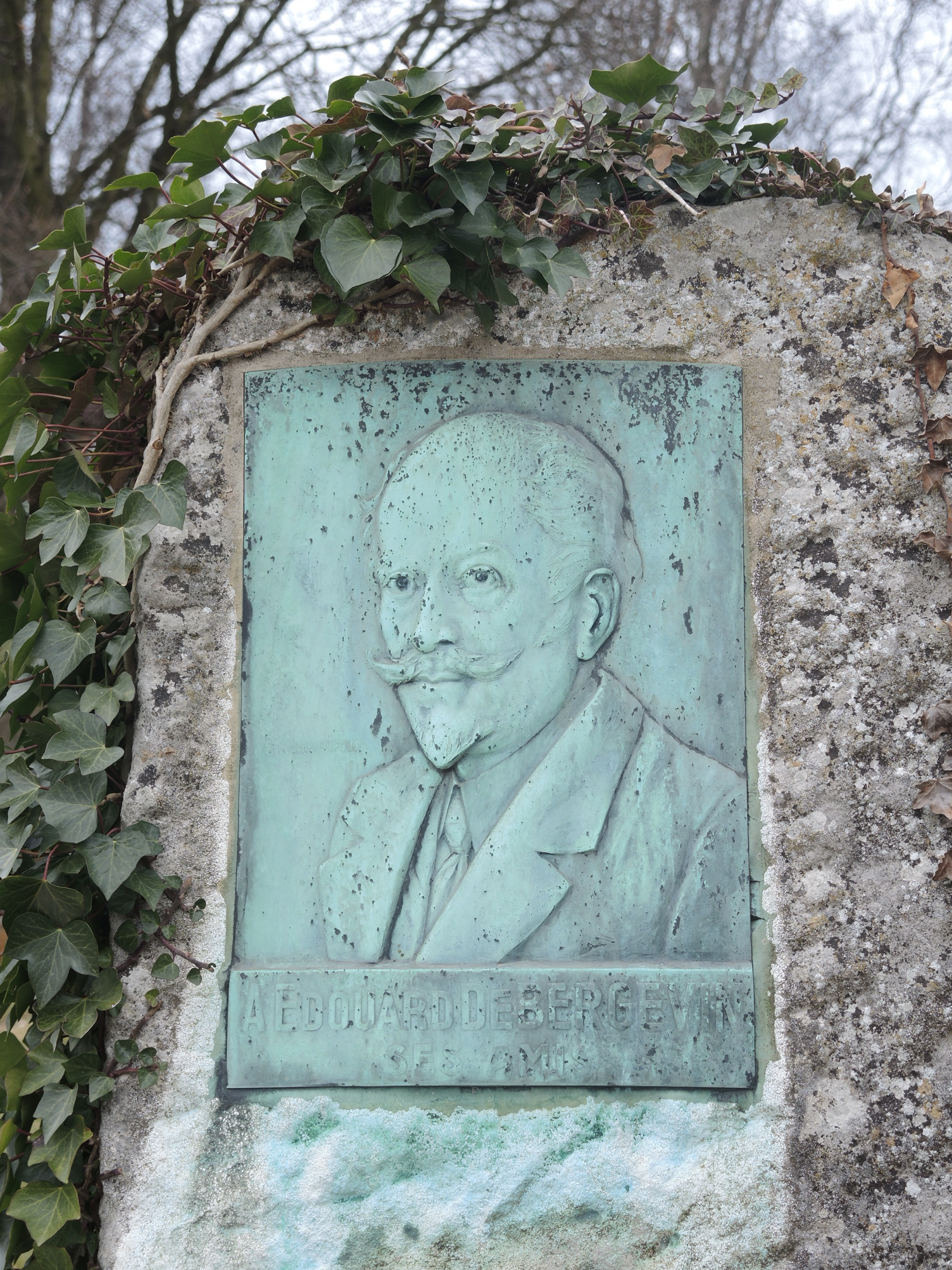
- Portrait of Edouard de Bergevin on his grave.
- Born: 18 July 1861; Couhé-Vérac
- Died: 6 December 1925 (aged 64); Rouen
- Occupation: Painter

Édouard de Bergevin (18 July 1861 – 6 December 1925) was a French painter of the Rouen school. He was novelist Colette Yver's brother.

He studied at the academy of painting of Rouen, with Frechon, Angrand and Joseph Delattre for fellow students, then in Paris in the studio of Jean-Léon Gérôme. He worked as a portrait painter, illustrator and poster artist, as well as a landscaper. Often accompanied by his friend Delattre, he painted the countryside of Douarnenez, views of Paris, views of the ports of Rouen and Brittany.

He is buried at Cimetière monumental de Rouen, next to his sister.

== Bibliography ==
- François Lespinasse (1980). L'École de Rouen (in French). Sotteville-lès-Rouen: Fernandez. pp. 54–57. LCCN 80155566. OCLC 18496892.
- François Lespinasse, L'École de Rouen, Lecerf, Rouen, 1995 ISBN 2901342043
