= Anna de Brémont =

American journalist

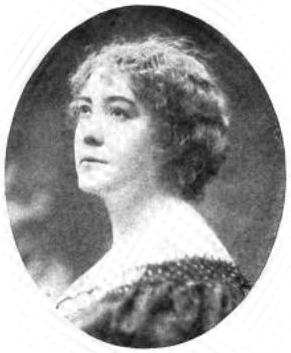
- In The Sketch, 18 October 1899
- Born: Anna Elizabeth Dunphy c. 1849; New York, New York, United States
- Died: 18 October 1922; London, England
- Burial place: Kensal Green Cemetery
- Occupations: Journalist, novelist, poet, singer
- Spouse(s): Émile-Leon, the Count de Brémont (m. 1877; died 1882)

Anna Elizabeth, Countess de Brémont (née Dunphy; c. 1849 – 18 October 1922) was an American journalist, novelist, poet and singer. She spent much of her life in England. A period in South Africa provided the material for some of her books.

== Early years ==
She was born Anna Elizabeth Dunphy in New York City. Following her father's death she moved to Cincinnati, Ohio with her mother, who then married Thomas Malloy, a merchant tailor from Lexington.

== Career ==
She became a principal singer in the choir of Cincinnati Cathedral and later a contralto soloist at Henry Ward Beecher's church in Brooklyn. In 1877, she married Émile-Leon, the Count de Brémont, a French medical doctor working in New York. Following his death in May 1882, she moved to Europe.

In London in 1888, she was initiated into the Order of the Golden Dawn, alongside Oscar Wilde's wife Constance. She later wrote a memoir about Wilde and his mother. In May 1888, she appeared at the Globe Theatre in London in "the Countess de Brémont's Matinee" as Rosalind in the forest scenes from As You Like It. The Era said "her style was decidedly unsatisfactory".

While in London she met the theatrical promoter Brandon Thomas. He set up a literary and musical tour for her, in the course of which she visited India, Australia and South Africa. She spent some time in South Africa, and on her departure from the country in June 1890, it was reported that she had a novel based on her experiences there in progress, and had begun preparing a lecture on life in the Transvaal, focusing on the social effects of the discovery of gold. The Gentleman Digger was published the next year, its characters thinly disguised versions of real people.

Cover of the 1899 revised edition of The Gentleman Digger.

In 1893, in the course of a review of three volumes by de Brémont, published under the general title of The World of Music, the New York Times reported that "it is said that this quondam light of Cincinnati now coruscates amid the incandescents of the Mrs Leo Hunter circle of London." In 1894, while working for St Paul's magazine in London, she wrote to the librettist W. S. Gilbert requesting an interview. He replied, saying that he would cooperate in return for a fee of 20 guineas. She wrote back saying that she anticipated "the pleasure of writing Mr Gilbert's obituary for nothing". Gilbert retaliated by sending letters to the press which referred to "a lady styling herself the Countess de Brémont". She sued Gilbert for libel, claiming he had implied that she had no right to her title. Gilbert told the court that he had no knowledge of de Brémont except for the letter, and the jury found in his favour.

She was in London during the First World War, where her experiences of German air-raids inspired her novel The Black Opal. In 1920, it was reported her fortune was gone. She died "penniless" in Earl's Court on 18 October 1922, aged 73, and was buried in the Roman Catholic section of Kensal Green Cemetery.

== Works ==
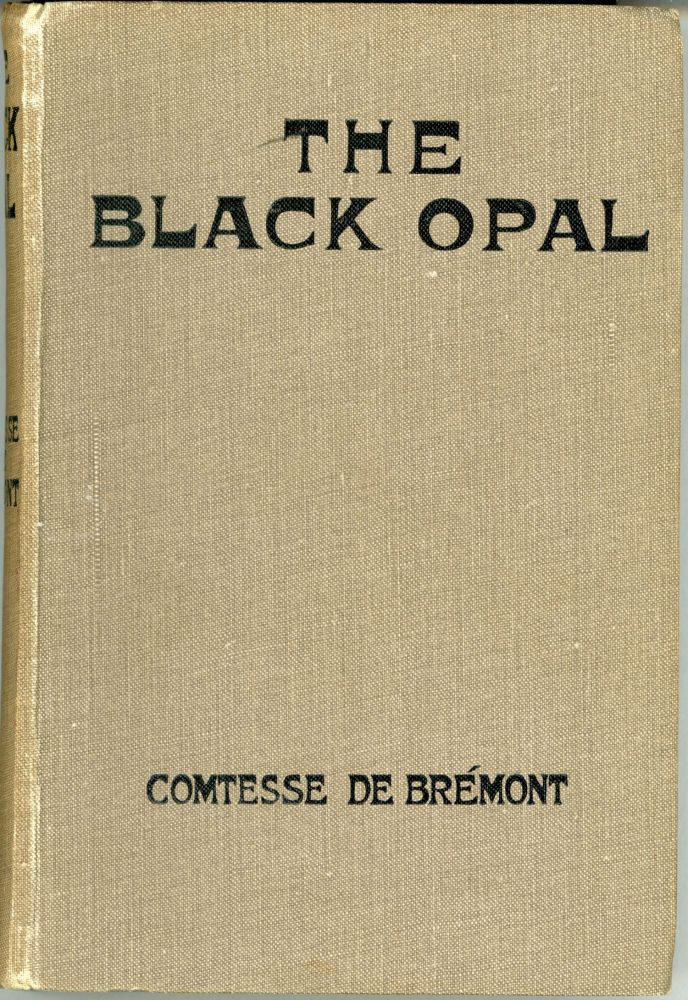
First edition cover of Anna de Brémont's final novel, The Black Opal (1918).

- Love Poems (Cape Town, 1889)
- The Gentleman Digger: a Study of Johannesburg Life (London, 1891)
- The World of Music: The Great Virtuosi (1892)
- The World of Music: The Great Singers (1892)
- The World of Music: The Great Composers (1892)
- Sonnets and Love Poems (New York, 1892)
- The Ragged Edge. Tales of the African Gold Fields (London, 1895)
- A Son of Africa. A Romance (London, 1899)
- Daughters of Pleasure: Being the History of Neara a Musician, Athene an Actress, and Hera a Singer (London, 1900)
- Lady Lilian's Luck. A Romance of Ostend (London, 1907)
- The Lioness of Mayfair (London, 1909)
- Mrs Evelyn's Husbands : a Problem in Marriage (London, 1909)
- Sonnets from a Parisian Balcony (London, 1910)
- Coronation Sonnets to Her Most Gracious Majesty Queen Mary (London, 1911)
- Oscar Wilde and his Mother: A Memoir (London, 1911)
- Love Letters in Verse To a Musician (London and New York, 1914; dedicated to the pianist Thuel Burnham)
- The Black Opal. A Fantastic Romance (London, 1918)

== Translation ==
- The Doctor Wife 1909. From the French novel Princesses de Science by Colette Yver (a pseudonym for Antoinette Huzard), 1907 Prix Femina
