= Rouen Monumental Cemetery =

Cemetery in Seine-Maritime, France

Coordinates: 49.4501°N 1.1167°E

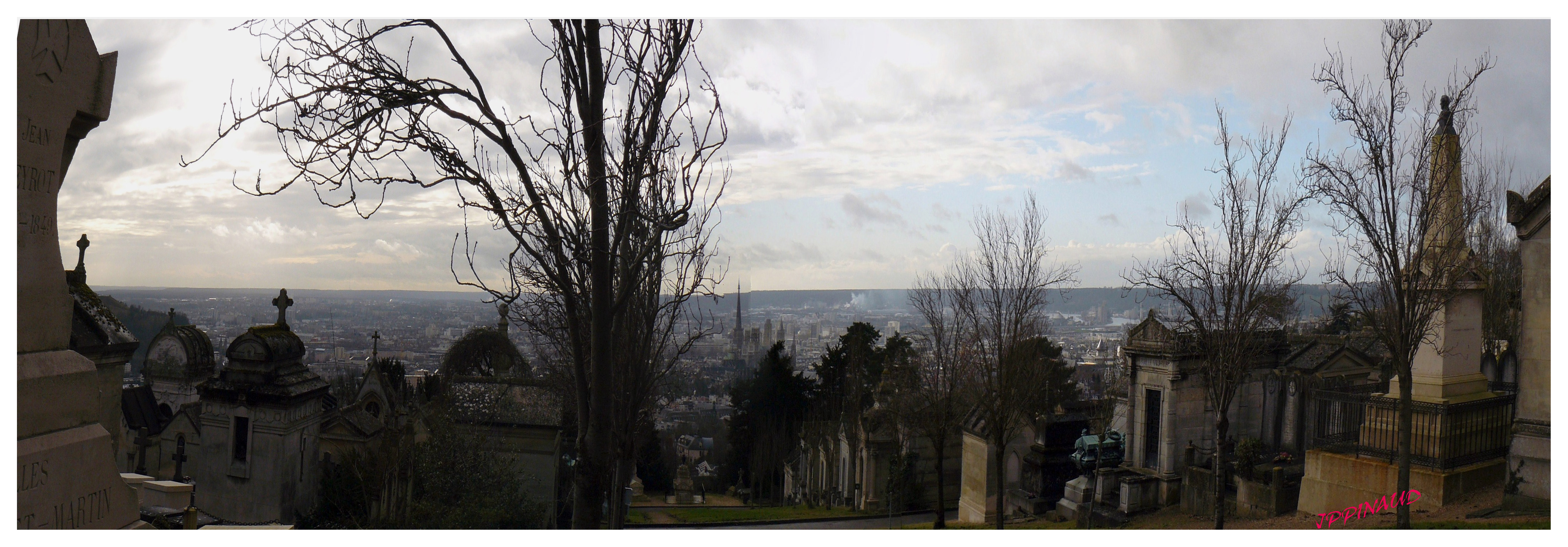
Cimetière Monumental de Rouen

The Rouen Monumental Cemetery (French: Cimetière monumental de Rouen) is the most important cemetery of the Norman city of Rouen, opened in 1828 and situated to the North-East of the town-centre. The entrance gate, the chapel and the monumental cross are the work of Charles Felix Maillet du Boullay.

== Buried people ==
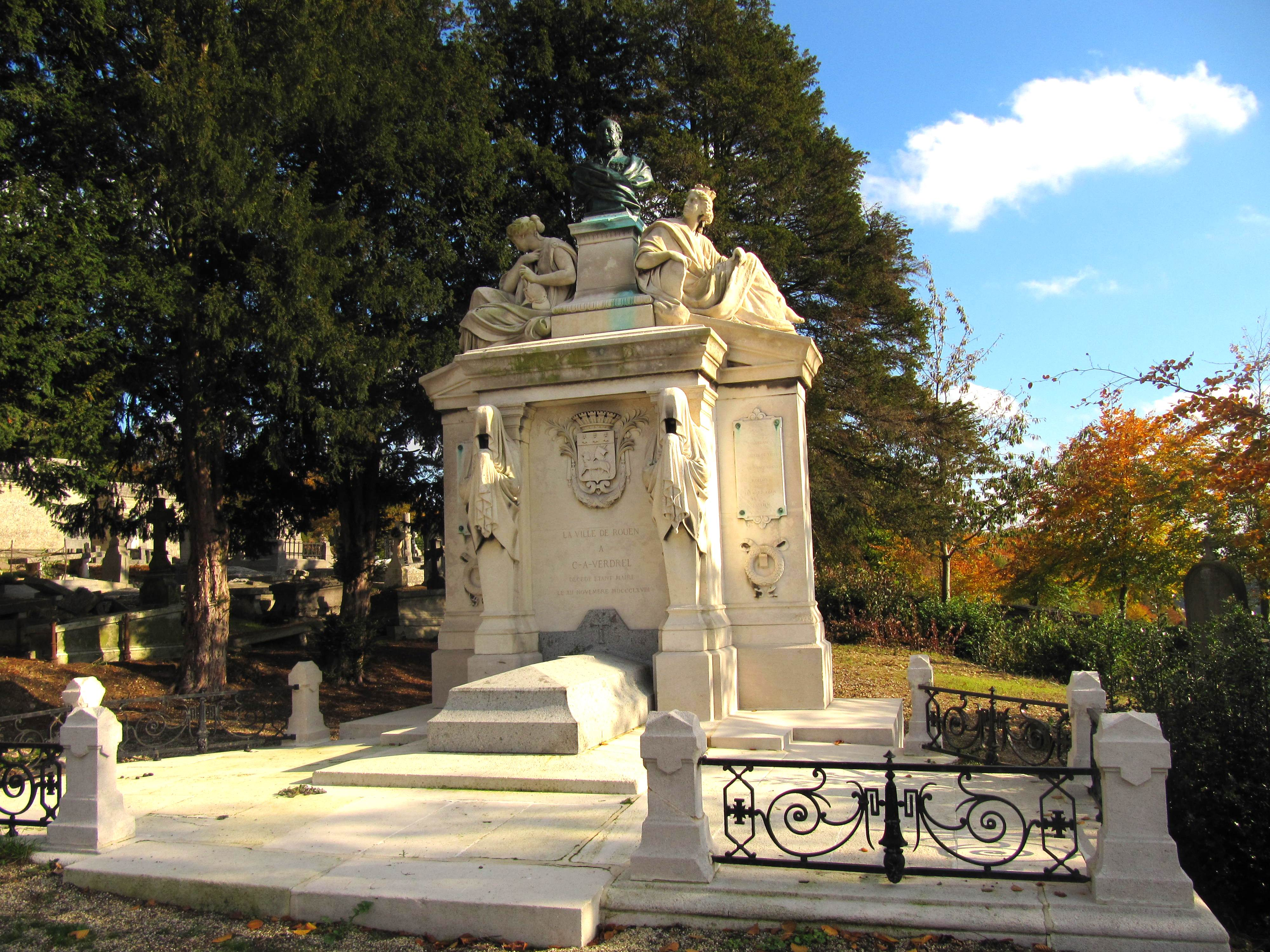
Charles Verdrel's grave

- Charles Angrand
- Henry Barbet
- Albert Beaucamp
- Michel Bérégovoy
- Édouard de Bergevin
- François Adrien Boieldieu (cœur)
- Georges Bouctot
- Louis Bouilhet
- Louis Auguste de Bourbel de Montpinçon
- Jean-Baptiste Cécille
- Marcel Couchaux
- Joseph-Désiré Court
- Pierre Chirol
- Jean Benoît Désiré Cochet
- Georges Dubosc
- Marcel Duchamp
- Suzanne Duchamp
- Raymond Duchamp-Villon
- Gustave Flaubert
- Jean Pierre Louis Girardin
- Jacques Hébertot
- Auguste Houzeau
- Eustache-Hyacinthe Langlois
- Albert Lebourg
- Théodore-Éloi Lebreton
- Léon-Jules Lemaître
- Valérius Leteurtre
- Juste Lisch
- Ferdinand Marrou
- Georges Métayer
- Étienne Nétien
- Émile Frédéric Nicolle
- Félix Archimède Pouchet
- Raymond Quenedey
- Augustin Pouyer-Quertier
- Marie Antoine de Reiset
- Jean Revel
- Louis Ricard
- Eugène Richard
- Antoine Sénard
- Jacques Villon
- Francis Yard
- Colette Yver

== Cremated people ==
- Henri Gadeau de Kerville
- Patrice Quéréel

== Bibliography ==
- J. Rivage, Le Cimetière monumental, Cagniard, Rouen, 1864
- Jean-Pierre Chaline, « L'Art funéraire expression d'une société ? L'exemple du Cimetière monumental de Rouen », dans Recueil d'études offert en hommage au Doyen M. de Boüard, Annales de Normandie, numéro spécial, Caen, 1982
- Jean-Pierre Chaline, « Mort d'un cimetière ? », in Bulletin des Amis des monuments rouennais, 1993
- Jean-Pierre Chaline (dir.), Mémoire d'une ville, le Cimetière monumental de Rouen, Société des Amis des monuments rouennais, Rouen, 1997 (ISBN 2-9509804-1-4) LCCN 2002-385002
- Ghilaine Lhermitte (1997). "Le cimetière monumental et l'avenue Georges Métayer". Le Quartier Jouvenet; 2 siècles d'histoire (in French). Rouen: Roussel. pp. 28–31. ISBN 2-911408-03-9. OCLC 492045554.
