= Juste Lisch =

French architect

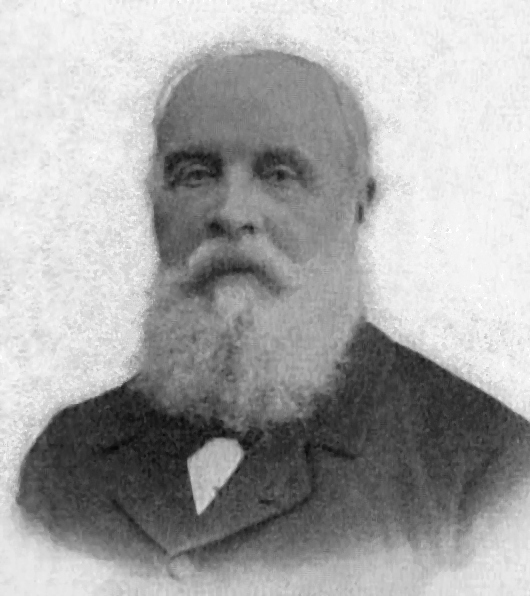
- Juste Lisch
- Born: Jean Juste Gustave Lisch; 10 June 1828; Alençon
- Died: 24 August 1910 (aged 82); Paris
- Resting place: monumental cemetery
- Education: Ecole des Beaux-Arts
- Occupation: Architect

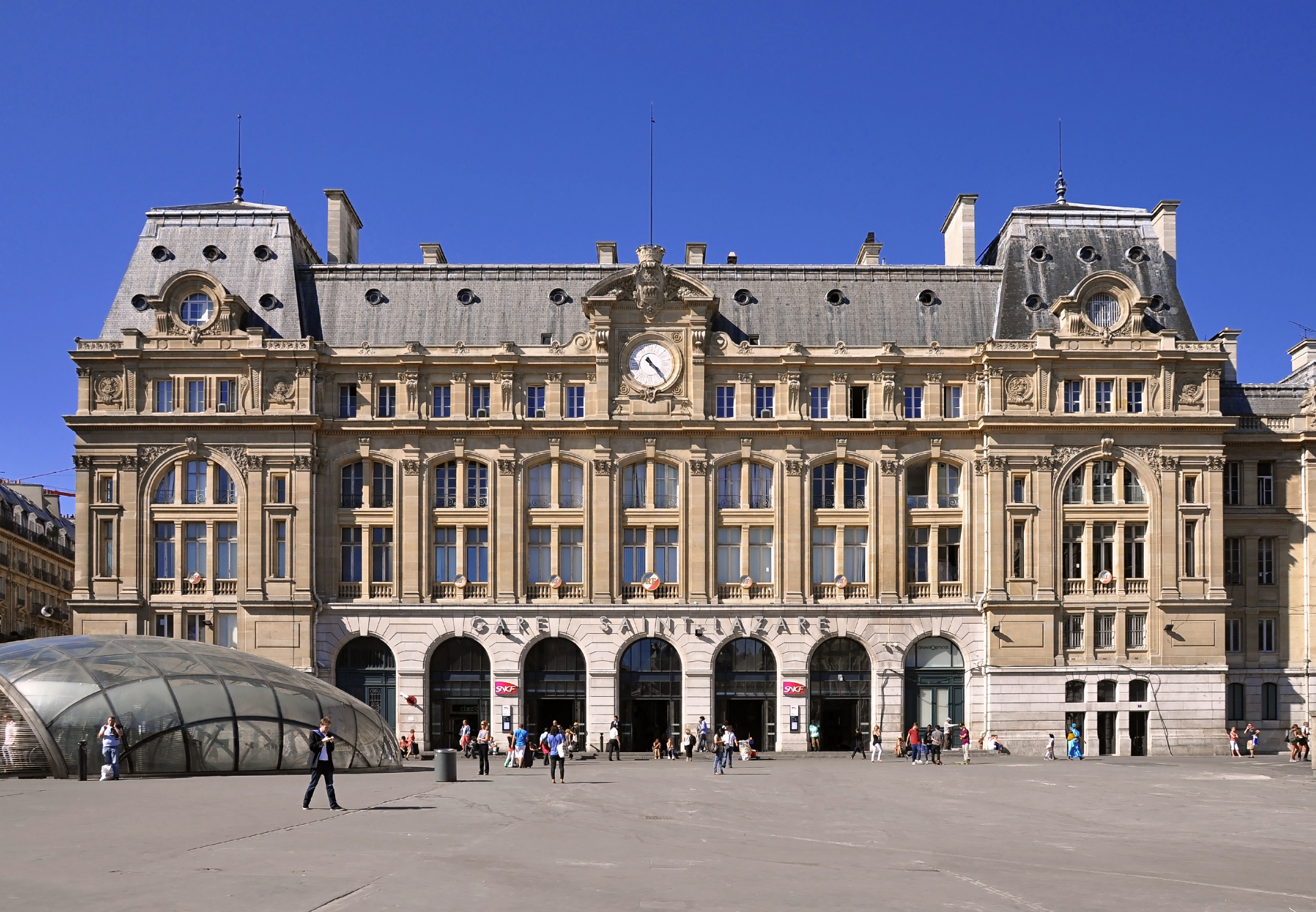
Gare Saint-Lazare

Jean Juste Gustave Lisch (French pronunciation: [ʒɑ̃ ʒyst ɡystav liʃ]; 10 June 1828 – 24 August 1910) was a French architect.

A native of Alençon, Lisch studied at the Ecole des Beaux-Arts and was pupil of Léon Vaudoyer and Henri Labrouste. His architectural career was geared towards civic work: stations, public buildings, churches, and restoration of monuments. He built the Gare des Carbonnets, a train station in a Paris suburb.

Juste Lisch retired in 1901 and died in Paris in 1910. He is buried in the Rouen monumental cemetery.

== Selected works ==
- renovation of the oratory at Germigny-des-Prés, 1867–1876
- Champ de Mars–Tour Eiffel station, 1878
- Gare Saint-Lazare, with the attached Hôtel Terminus, Paris, 1885–87
- Le Havre station, 1888
- Javel station, Paris, 1889
- Avenue Foch station, Paris, 1900
- Invalides station, Paris, 1900
- The Hôtel de Ville in La Rochelle
- Lyon Magistrates' court
- Saint-Benoît-sur-Loire church
- Ferrières, Manche church
- Notre-Dame-de-Cléry church
- Château de Pierrefonds (the last part of renovation works, 1885)
