= Gare Lisch =

Out-of-use railway station in Asnières-sur-Seine, France

Gare Lisch Gare des Carbonnets
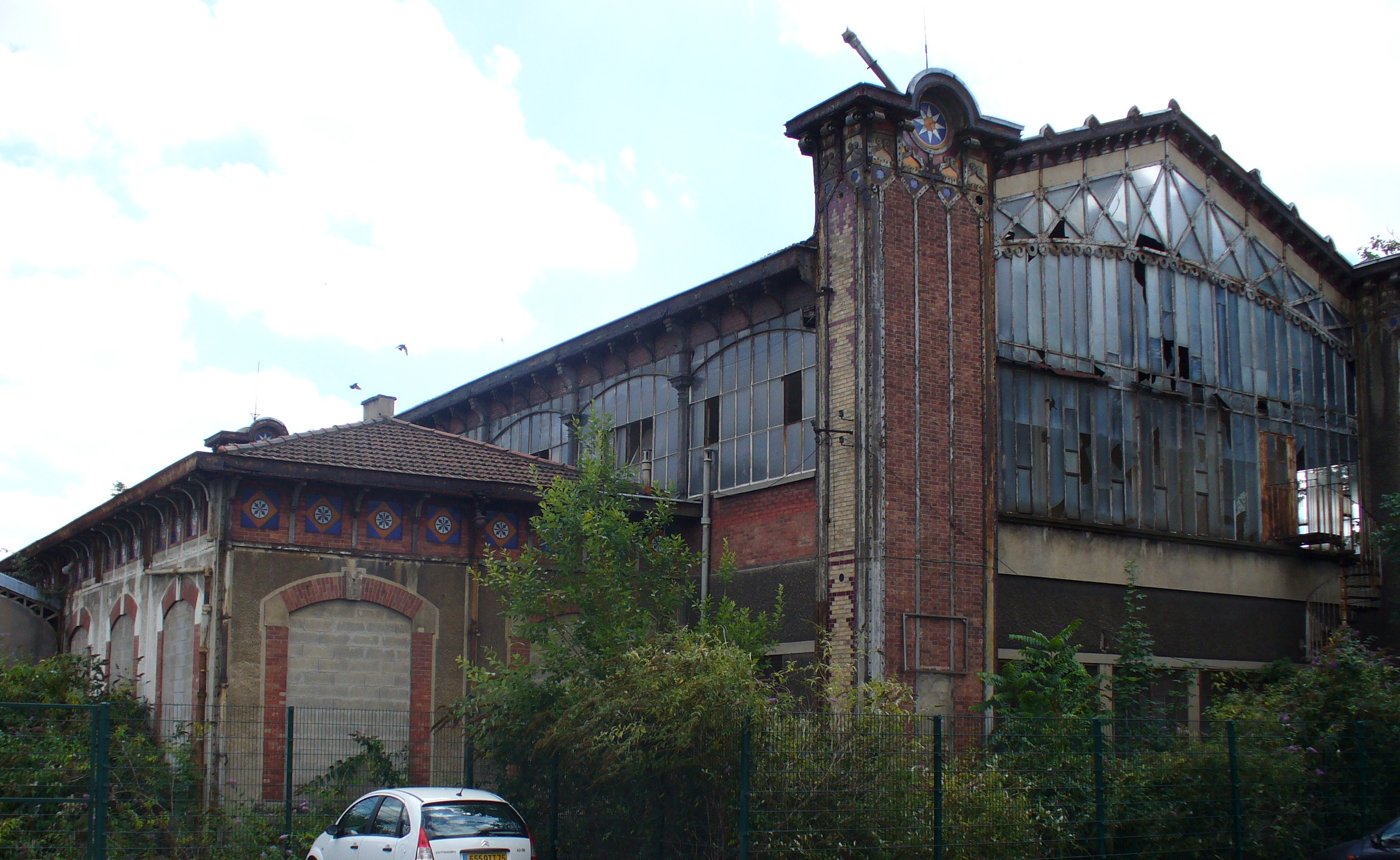
- Station in 2007

General information
- Location: Asnières-sur-Seine; France
- Coordinates: 48°54′44″N 2°16′24″E
- Owner: SNCF

History
- Opened: 1878 (Paris); 1897 (Asnières-sur-Seine)
- Closed: 1937
- Electrified: 1924
Location

Gare Lisch (French pronunciation: [ɡaʁ liʃ]; lit. 'Lisch station'; also Gare des Carbonnets) is an antique train station designed by architect Juste Lisch and presently located in the suburb of Asnières-sur-Seine, France, northwest of Paris. It was originally built in 1878 near the site of the Eiffel Tower to serve the third Parisian world's fair, the Exposition Universelle. It was moved to its current site in 1897. A vast 19th-century monument (about 15 000 sq ft), it is located minutes to Paris-Saint-Lazare by train (at nearby Bois-Colombes).

The building is a masterpiece of architecture with unique original features and vast dimensions. Natural light falls from a glass canopy that encompasses the length of the station.

The building was run down until 2025 when a complete renovation was undertaken by the city of Asnières-sur-Seine to refurbish the national historical monument. It still contains the original equipment of an antique railway station, including station platforms, rails and traffic signs, which makes it appear somewhat like a ghost station. No particular further use is determined at this point although its size and natural lighting suggest to use it for art exhibits or as a fashion runway.
