= Château de Pierrefonds =

Castle in France

Coordinates: 49°20′49″N 2°58′49″E

- Pierrefonds, Oise, France
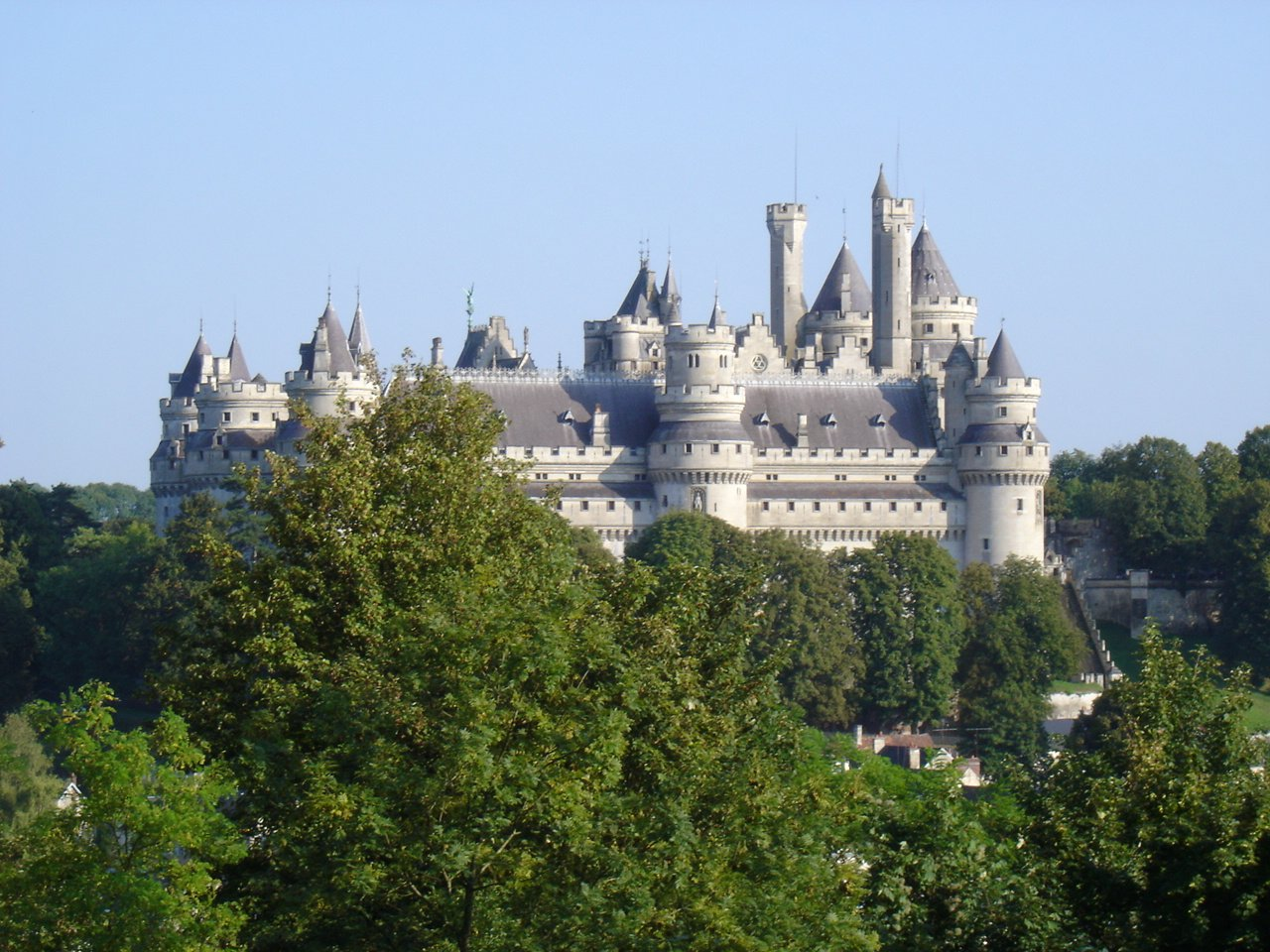
- The Château de Pierrefonds in September 2004

Site information
- Type: Medieval castle
- Website: chateau-pierrefonds.fr

Site history
- Built: c. 1393–1407
- Built by: Louis I, Duke of Orléans
- Events: Hundred Years War

The Château de Pierrefonds (French pronunciation: [ʃɑto d(ə) pjɛʁfɔ̃]) is a castle situated in the commune of Pierrefonds in the Oise department in the Hauts-de-France region, Northern France.

It is located on the southeast edge of the forest of Compiègne, northeast of Paris, between the towns of Villers-Cotterêts and Compiègne.

The Château de Pierrefonds includes most of the characteristics of defensive military architecture from the Middle Ages, though it underwent a major restoration in the 19th century.

== History ==
In the 12th century, a castle was built on this site. Two centuries later, in 1392, King Charles VI turned the County of Valois (of which Pierrefonds was part) into a duchy and gave it to his brother Louis I, Duke of Orléans. From 1393 to his death in 1407, the latter had the castle rebuilt by the court architect, Jean le Noir.

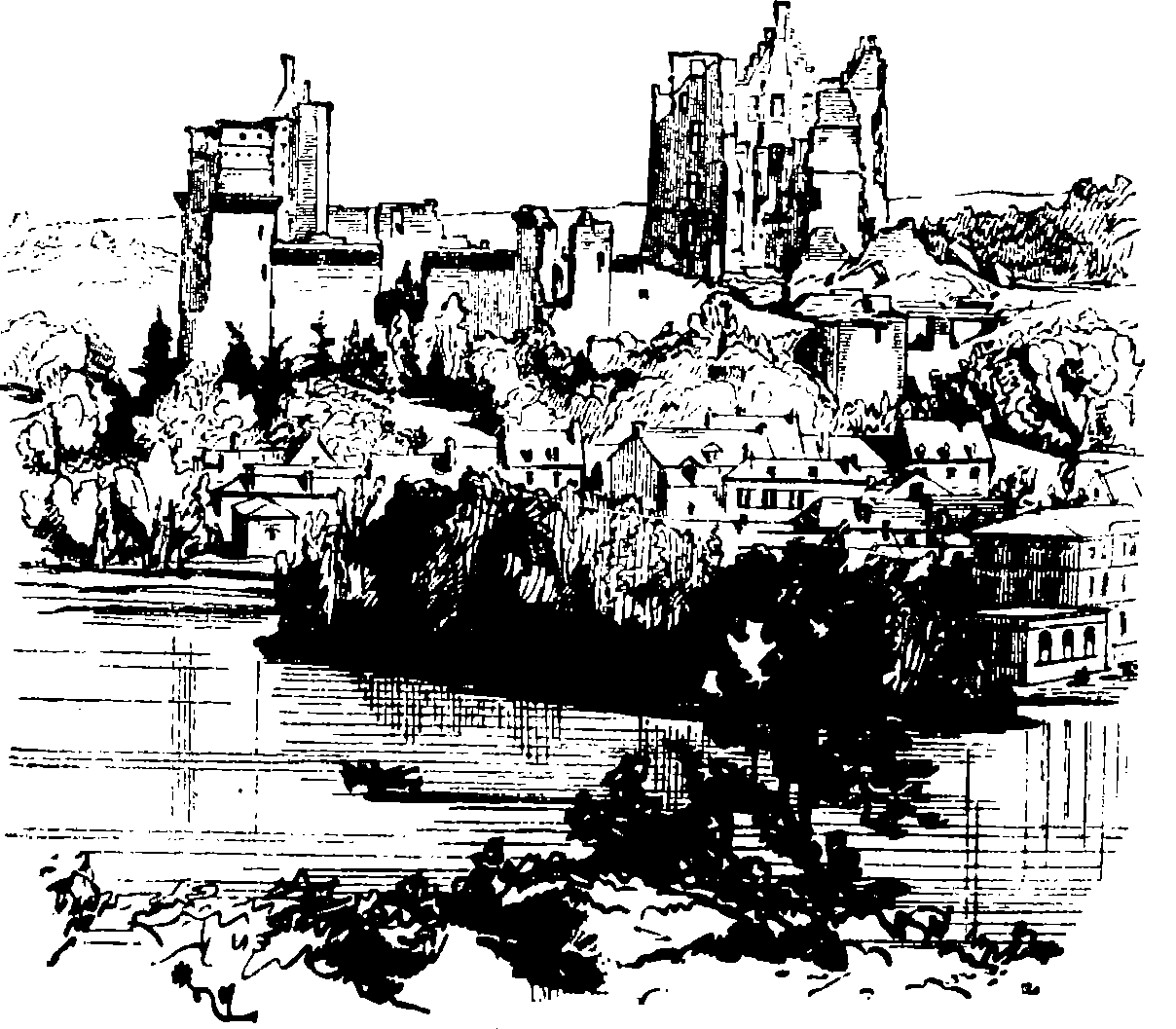
View of the ruins before the 19th-century restoration

In March 1617, during the early troubled days of Louis XIII's reign, the castle, then the property of François Annibal d'Estrées (brother of Gabrielle d'Estrées, mistress and advisor to Henri IV), who joined the "parti des mécontents" (party of discontent) led by Henri II, Prince of Condé, was besieged and taken by troops sent by Cardinal Richelieu, the secretary of state for war. Its demolition was started, but not carried through to the end because of the enormity of the task. The exterior works were razed, the roofs destroyed and holes made in the towers and curtain walls.

The castle remained a ruin for more than two centuries. Napoleon I bought it in 1810 for less than 3,000 francs. During the 19th century, with the rediscovery of the architectural heritage of the Middle Ages, it became a "romantic ruin": in August 1832, Louis Philippe I gave a banquet there on the occasion of the marriage of his daughter Louise of Orléans to Leopold I of Belgium, first king of the Belgians. Among other artists, Corot depicted the ruins in several works between 1834 and 1866. The Château de Pierrefonds has been classified as a monument historique by the French Ministry of Culture since 1848.

Louis-Napoléon Bonaparte (later Napoleon III of France) visited the castle in 1850. As emperor, in 1857 he asked Eugène Viollet-le-Duc to undertake its restoration, which was continued by Maurice Ouadou and then Juste Lisch until 1885. There was no question of a simple repair to the habitable parts (the keep and annexes): the "picturesque" ruins in front were to be kept for décor. In 1861, the project grew in scale: the sovereign wanted to create an imperial residence, so the castle was to be entirely rebuilt. The works, which would cost 5 million francs, of which 4 million were to come from the civil list, were stopped in 1885, six years after the death of Viollet-le-Duc. The departure of Napoleon III had halted the reconstruction and, due to lack of money, the decoration of rooms was unfinished. Inside, Viollet-le-Duc produced more a work of invention than restoration (polychrome paintings). He imagined how the castle ought to have been, rather than basing his work on the strict history of the building. On the other hand, with the exterior he showed an excellent knowledge of the military architecture of the 14th century.

== Castle today ==
Château de Pierrefonds has been designated as a monument historique since 1862. It is now managed by the Centre des monuments nationaux.

== Media ==
The castle has often been used as a location for filming including Les Visiteurs, Killer Tomatoes Eat France, Le Capitan, Highlander: The Series, The Messenger: The Story of Joan of Arc and the 1998 version of The Man in the Iron Mask. The castle was used as the setting for Camelot in the BBC series Merlin; a cut scene of this castle was used to portray Wiz Tech Academy in Disney's TV series Wizards of Waverly Place. In 2017, the castle was used for filming during the Canal+ and Netflix series Versailles.

== Gallery ==
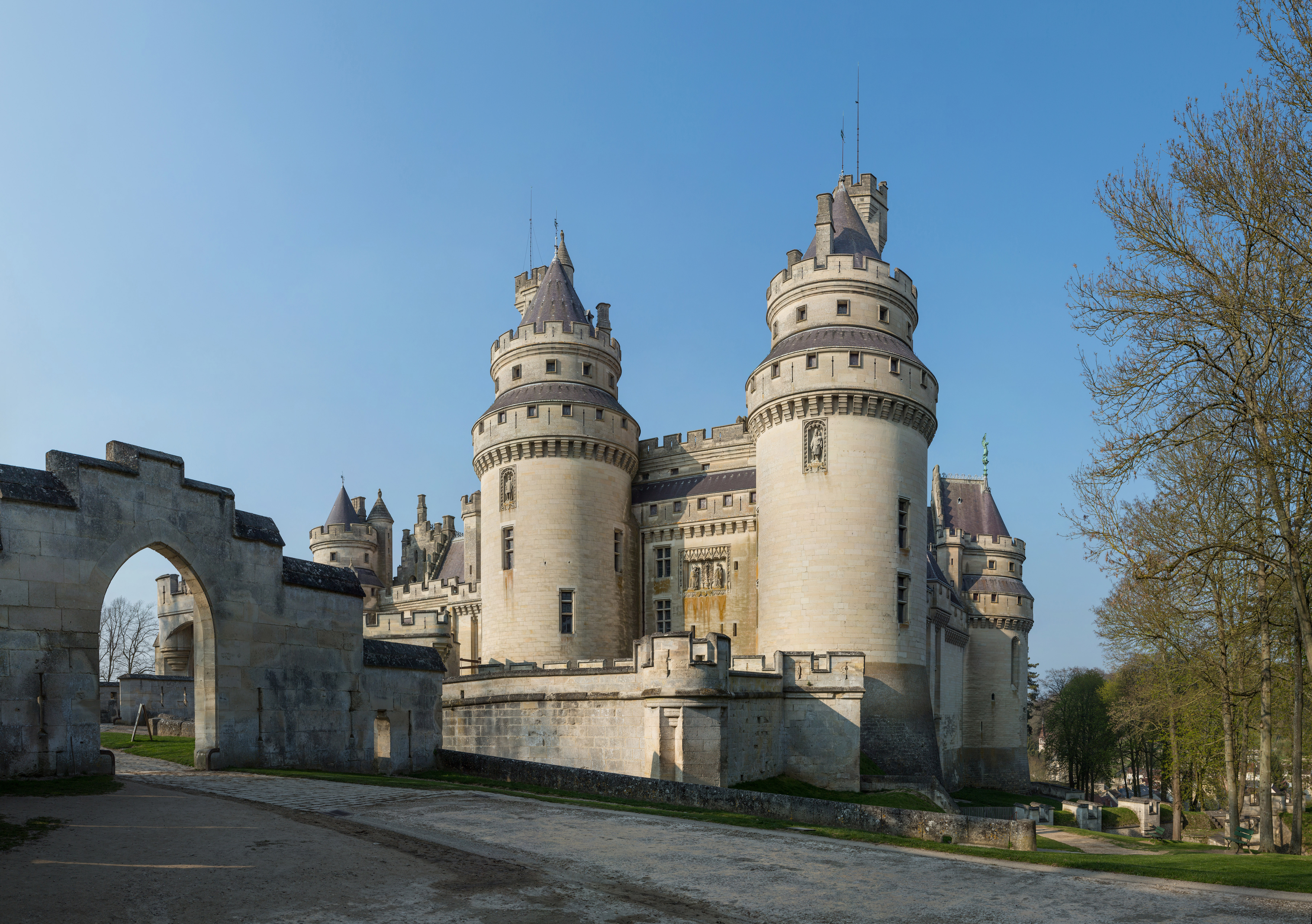
General view of the entrance

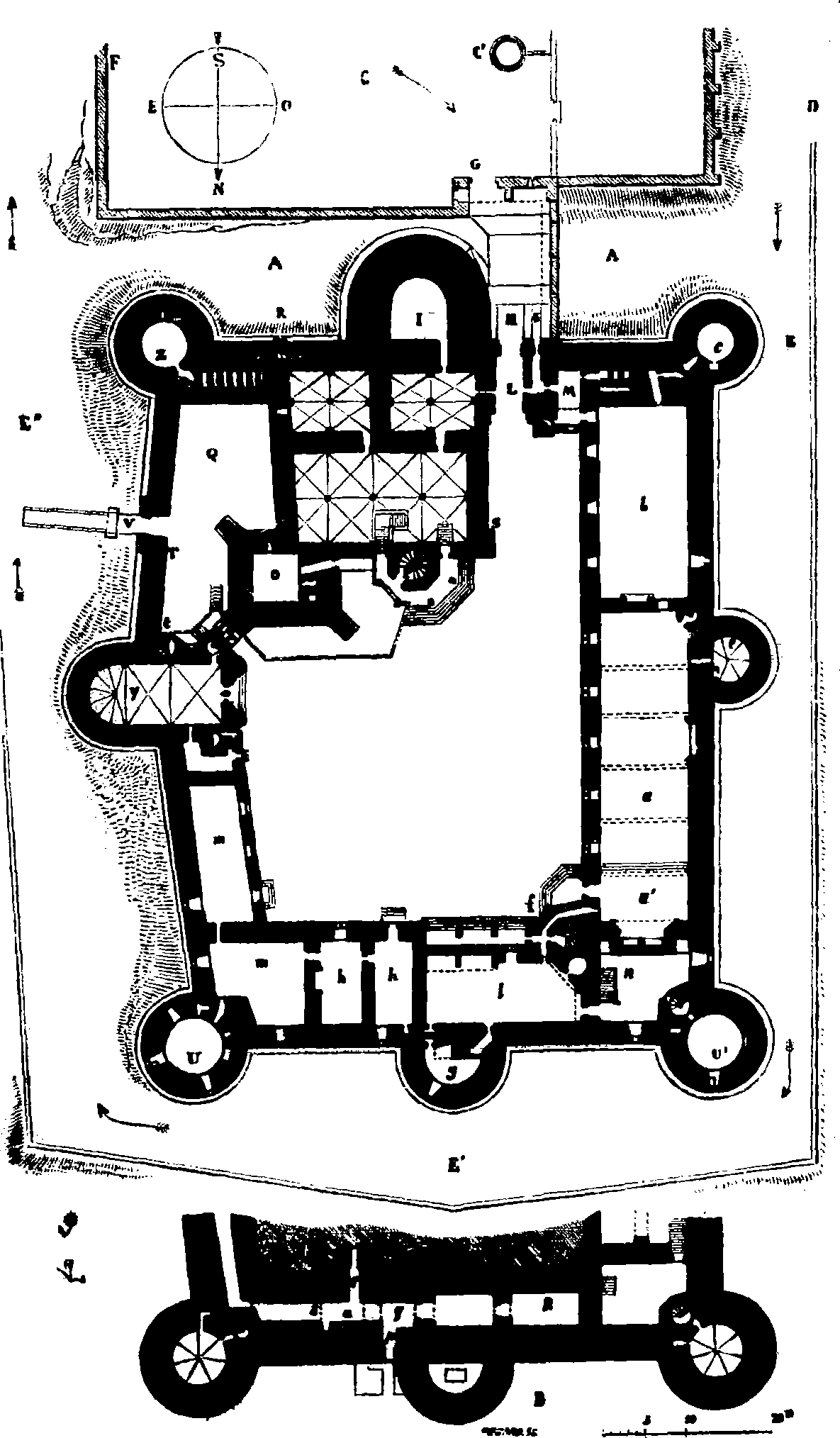
Plan of the present castle

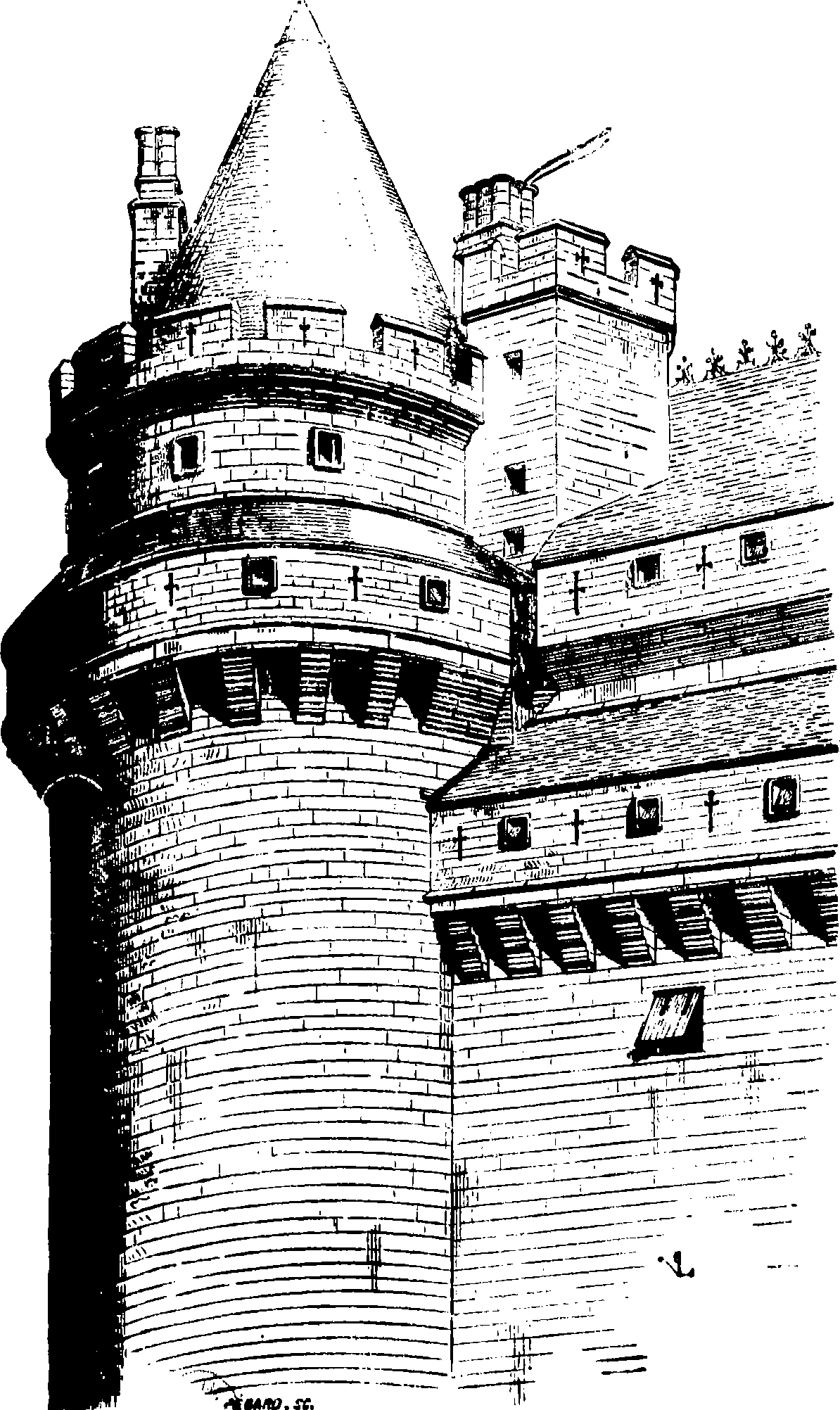
Northeast tower restored

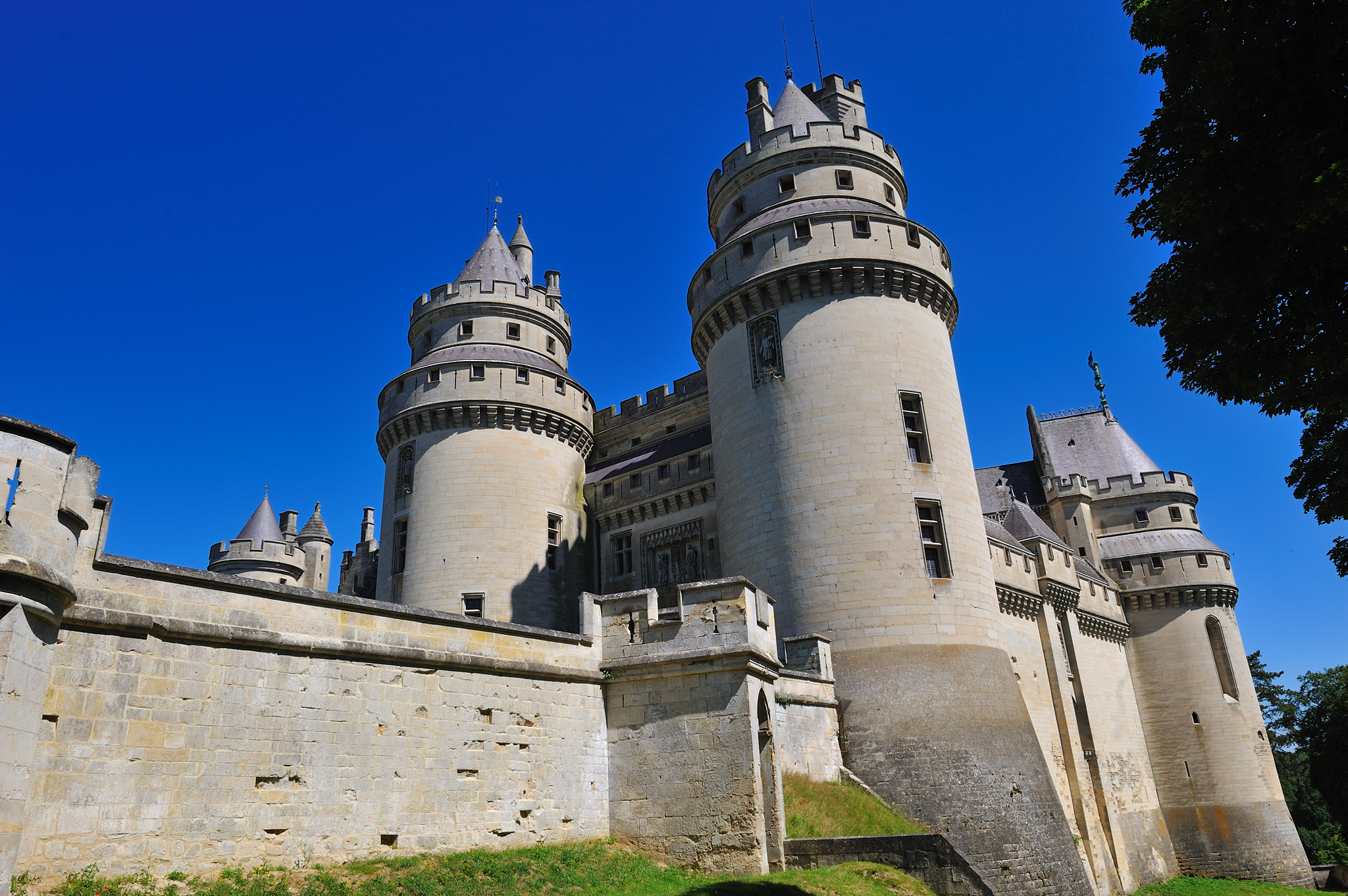
View in 2008

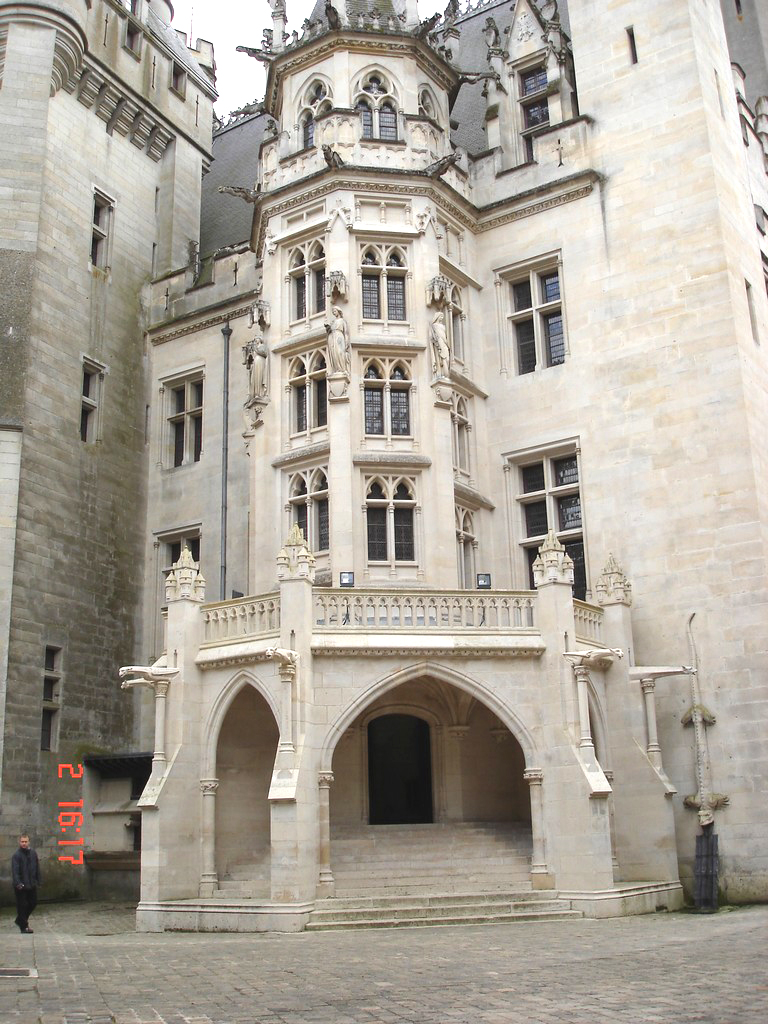
Entrance to the principal residential block

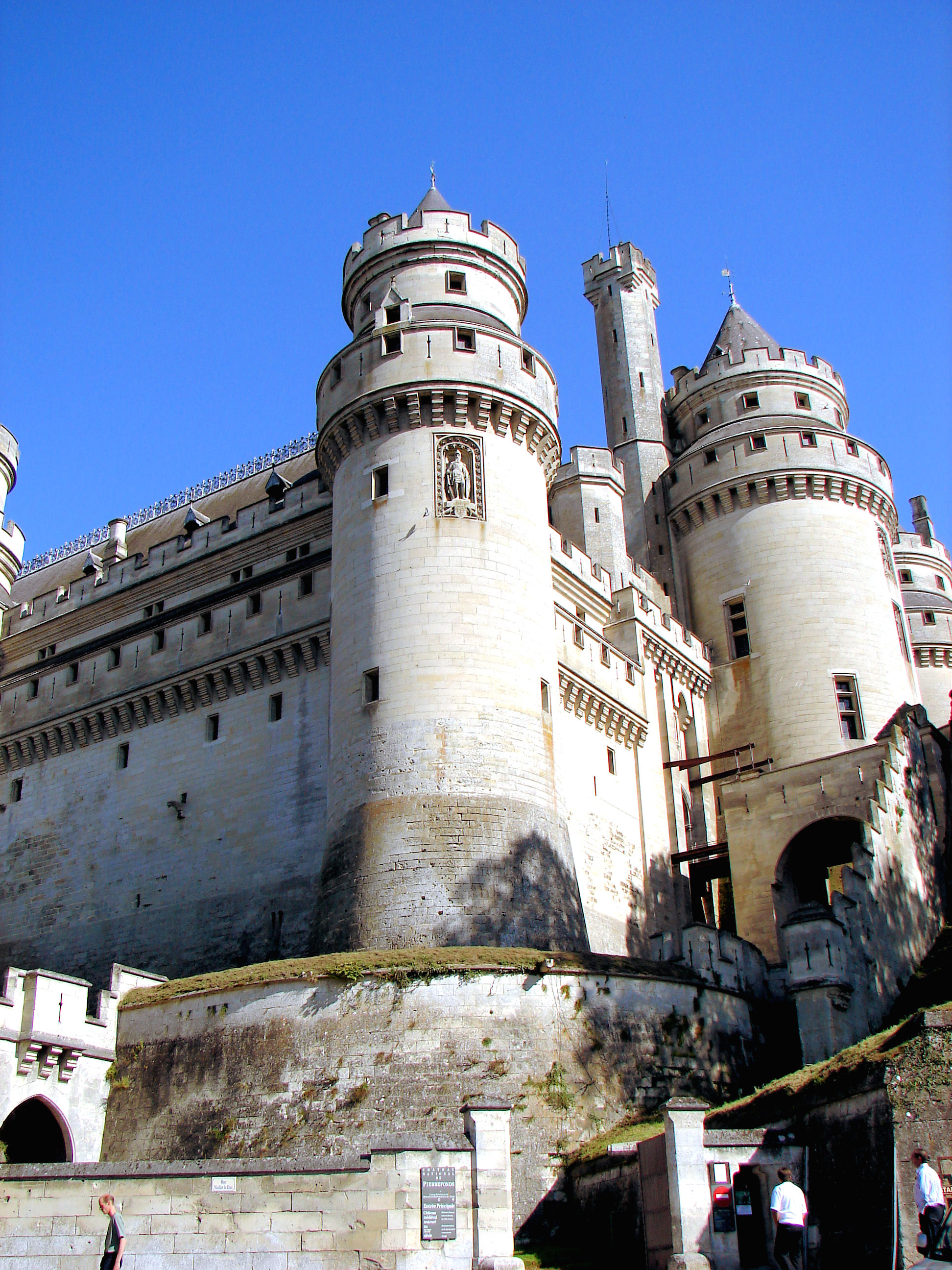
Entrance side view

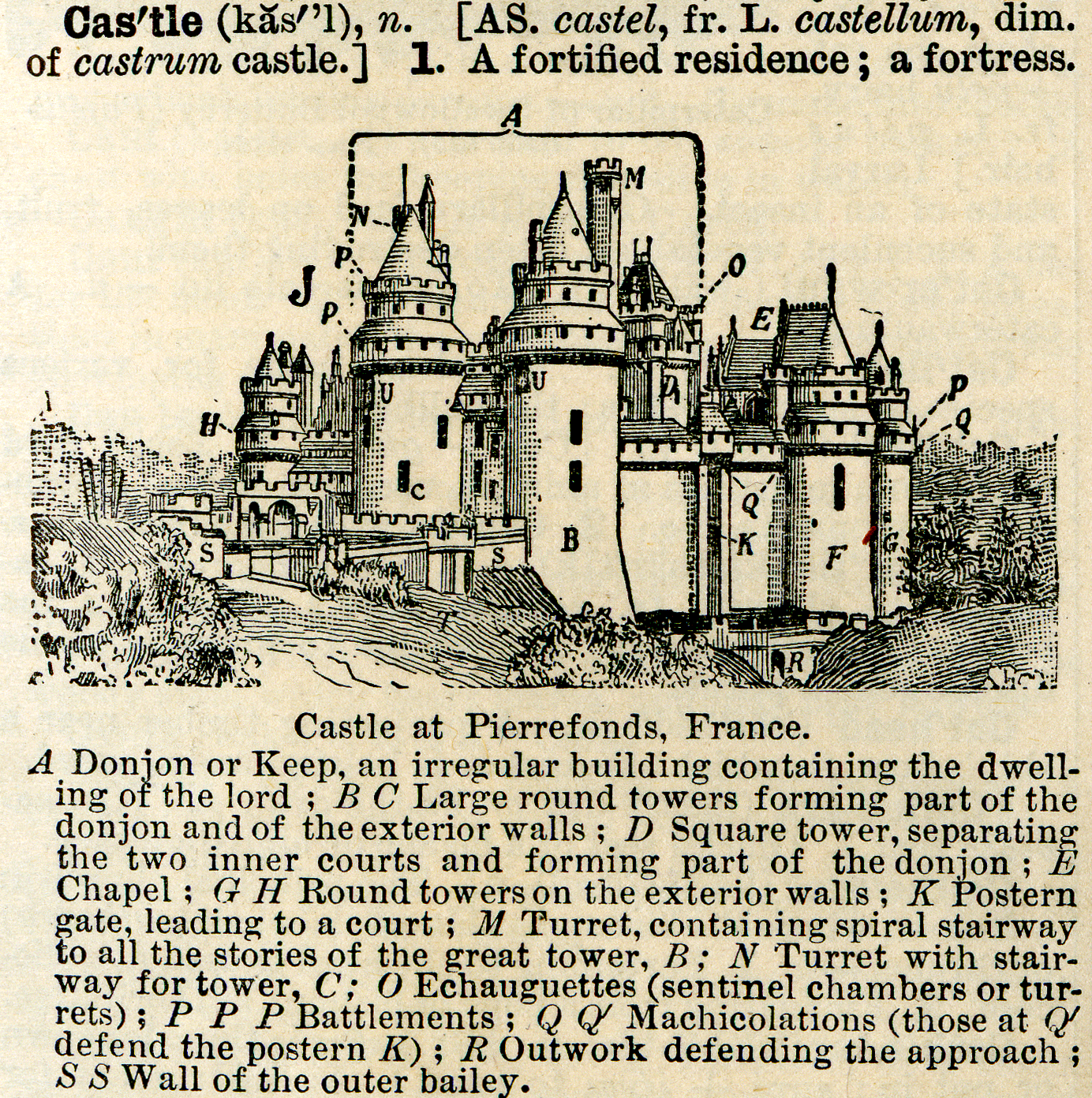
From an 1895 dictionary

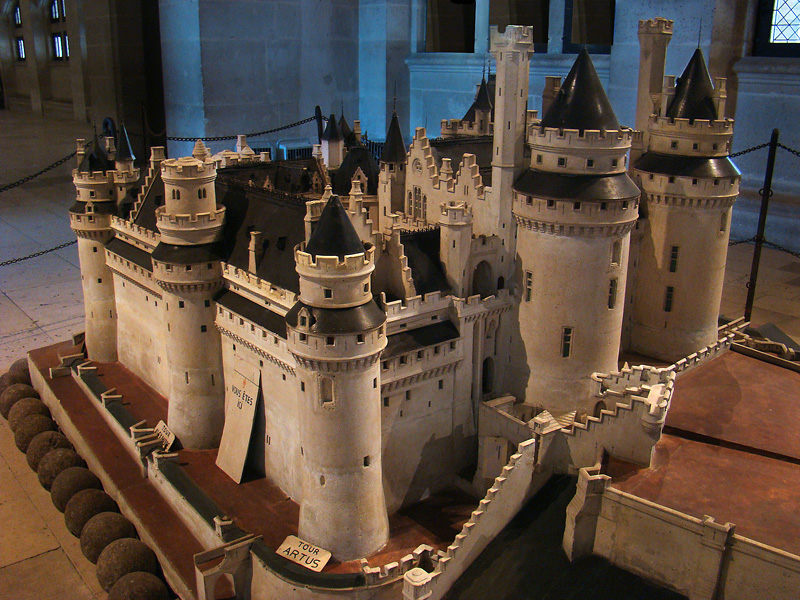
Stone scale model

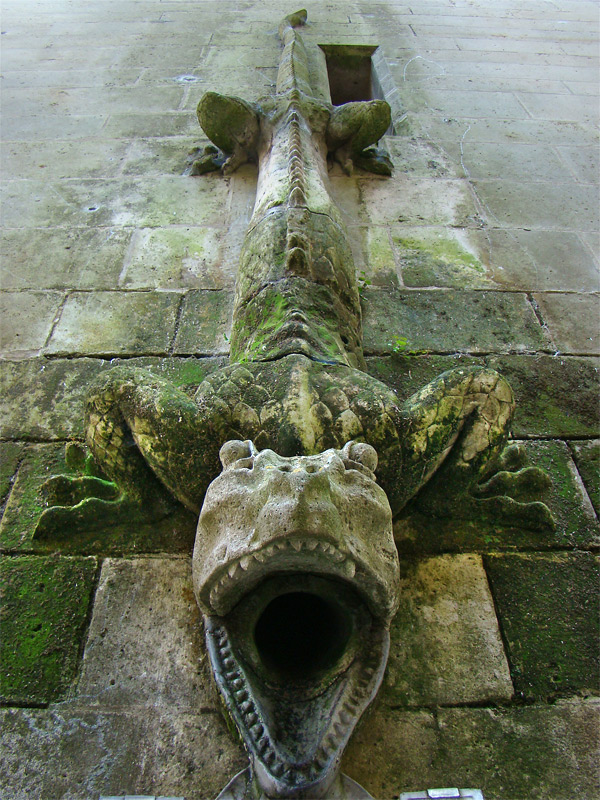
Donjon drain-pipe

== See also ==
- List of castles in France
- Domaine du Bois d'Aucourt d'Adolphe Clément-Bayard à Pierrefonds, a former hunting lodge of Louis XIV.
