= Colette Yver =

French writer

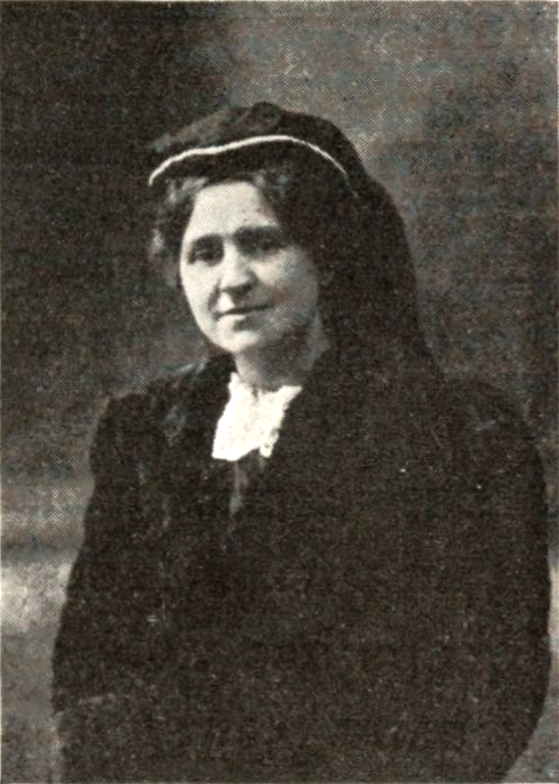
- Colette Yver c. 1920
- Born: Antoinette de Bergevin; 28 July 1874; Segré (Maine-et-Loire)
- Died: 17 March 1953 (aged 78); Rouen
- Occupation: Writer

Colette Yver (28 July 1874 – 17 March 1953) was a French Roman Catholic writer from Normandy, the winner of the 1907 Prix Femina for her work Princesses de science.

== Biography ==
The daughter of a civil servant transferred to Rouen shortly after her birth, Colette Yver was a prolific writer who began publishing, from the age of eighteen, novels for the "Bibliothèque morale de la jeunesse" at Mégard in Rouen. She would publish about a book (novels, essays, or hagiographies) a year for the next fifty years of her life. Her works are representative of the anti-feminist fiction which abounded under the Third Republic. Intended for a female audience, these types of novels depicted emancipated women confronted with multiple misfortunes that they would not have suffered had they chosen life at home.

In 1907, she won the prix Femina (then called prix Vie Heureuse, présided by Jeanne Lapauze) for Princesses de science, A book referring to the difficulties encountered by women in reconciling family and scientific careers. In 1913 she entered the jury of this award, of which she was long the dean, until 1951. In 1917, she was admitted to the Académie des sciences, belles-lettres et arts de Rouen.

Her sister Marguerite (1869-1961), wife of Dr. Guillaume, a young widow with two children in 1896, a professor of French until an advanced age in free education, gave Le Journal de Rouen tales for children under the pseudonym "Hélène Avril".

She is buried at cimetière monumental de Rouen next to her brother, painter Édouard de Bergevin.

She was made a Chevalier of the Légion d'honneur (decree 11 August 1931).

== Essays, novels ==
- 1907: Princesses de science, Calmann-Lévy, (crowned by the Prix Vie Heureuse, previous name of the Prix Femina)
- 1911: Le Métier de Roi, Calmann-Lévy
- 1916: Comment s'en vont les Reines, Calmann-Lévy,
- 1919: Les cousins riches
- 1920: Dans le jardin du féminisme
- 1909: Les Dames du Palais
- 1926: Aujourd'hui...
- 1928: La Bergerie
- 1908: Les Cervelines, Calmann-lévy
- 1929: Femmes d'aujourd'hui
- 1931: Vincent ou La Solitude
- 1932: Le Vote des femmes
- 1912: Un coin du voile
- 1913: Les sables mouvants Archived 2016-12-21 at the Wayback Machine in Revue des Deux mondes
- 1928: Le mystère des béatitudes
- 1917: Mirabelle de Pampelune
- 1928: Le festin des autres
- 1928: L'homme et le dieu
- 1928: Vous serez comme des dieux
- 1928: Haudequin de Lyon

== Bibliography ==
- Léon Abensour, Histoire générale du féminisme des origines à nos jours, Delagrave, Paris, 1921; 1979 ISBN 2050001169.
- Michel Manson, Colette Yver, jeune auteure pour la jeunesse de 1892 à 1900, in "Cahiers Robinsons", n° 5, 2004, Juvenilia (écritures précoces), issue directed by Guillemette Tison, p. 61-77.
- Rebecca Rogers and Françoise Thébaud, La fabrique des filles. L'éducation des filles de Jules Ferry à la pilule, Paris, Éditions Textuel, 2010
