= Canton of Yerville =

Coordinates: 49°39′32″N 0°53′15″E

Yerville
- Former canton
- Interactive map of Yerville
- Country: France
- Region: Normandy
- Department: Seine-Maritime
- No. of communes: {{{nbcomm}}}
- Disbanded: 2015
- Area: 127.45 km^{2} (49.21 sq mi)
- Population (2012): 10,782
  - Density: 84.598/km^{2} (219.11/sq mi)

The Canton of Yerville is a former canton situated in the Seine-Maritime département and in the Haute-Normandie region of northern France. It was disbanded following the French canton reorganisation which came into effect in March 2015. It consisted of 18 communes, which joined the canton of Yvetot in 2015. It had a total of 10,782 inhabitants (2012).

== Geography ==
A farming area situated some 20 miles (32 km) northwest of Rouen. The altitude varies from 89m (Hugleville-en-Caux) to 177m (Saussay) with an average altitude of 213m.

The canton comprised 18 communes:

- Ancretiéville-Saint-Victor
- Auzouville-l'Esneval
- Bourdainville
- Cideville
- Criquetot-sur-Ouville
- Ectot-l'Auber
- Ectot-lès-Baons
- Étoutteville
- Flamanville
- Grémonville
- Hugleville-en-Caux
- Lindebeuf
- Motteville
- Ouville-l'Abbaye
- Saint-Martin-aux-Arbres
- Saussay
- Vibeuf
- Yerville

== Population ==
Historical population Canton of Yerville
Year	1962	1968	1975	1982	1990	1999
Pop.	5,668	6,236	6,521	7,714	8,470	8,968
±%	—	+10.0%	+4.6%	+18.3%	+9.8%	+5.9%
From the year 1962 on: No double counting – residents of multiple communes (e.g. students and military personnel) are counted only once. Source: INSEE

== See also ==
- Arrondissements of the Seine-Maritime department
- Cantons of the Seine-Maritime department
- Communes of the Seine-Maritime department
