= Hautot =

Hautot may refer to:

== Places ==
- Hautot-l'Auvray, commune in the Seine-Maritime department in the Normandy region in northern France.
- Hautot-le-Vatois, a commune in the Seine-Maritime department in the Normandy region in northern France
- Hautot-Saint-Sulpice, a commune in the Seine-Maritime department in the Normandy region in northern France
- Hautot-sur-Mer, a commune in the Seine-Maritime department in the Normandy region in northern France
- Hautot-sur-Seine, a commune in the Seine-Maritime department in the Normandy region in north-western France.

== People ==
- Fauve Hautot (born 1986), French dancer and choreographer

== Others ==
- 15705 Hautot, an asteroid
