= Veauville-lès-Baons =

- Part of Les Hauts-de-Caux
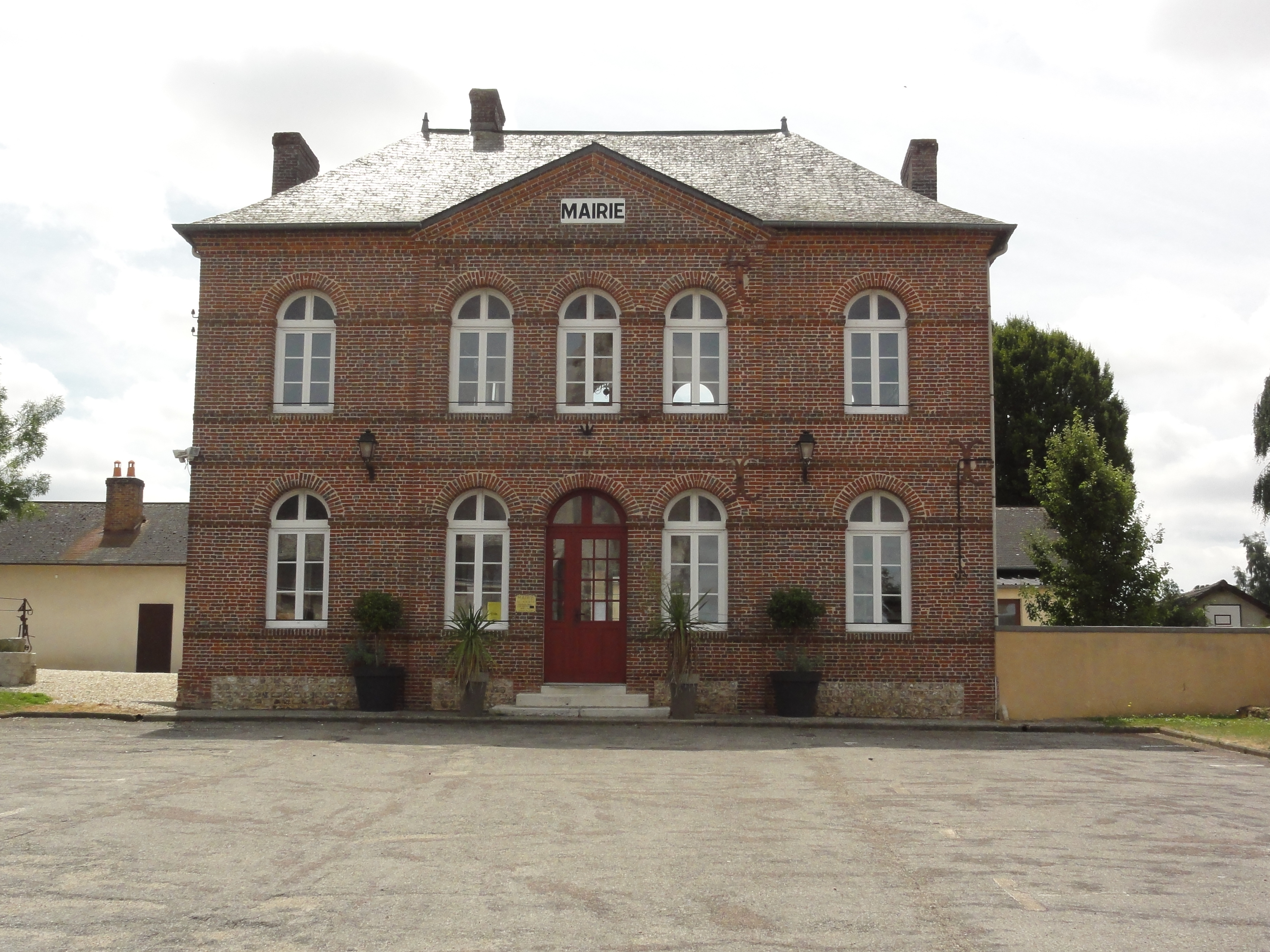
- Town hall
- Location of Veauville-lès-Baons
- Location within France Location within Normandy
- Coordinates: 49°39′14″N 0°46′03″E
- Country: France
- Region: Normandy
- Department: Seine-Maritime
- Arrondissement: Rouen
- Canton: Yvetot
- Commune: Les Hauts-de-Caux
- Area^{1}: 7.96 km^{2} (3.07 sq mi)
- Elevation: 145 m (476 ft)
- Highest elevation: 152 m (499 ft)
- Lowest elevation: 118 m (387 ft)
- Population (2023): 677
  - Density: 85.1/km^{2} (220/sq mi)
- Time zone: UTC+01:00 (CET)
  - Summer (DST): UTC+02:00 (CEST)
- Postal code: 76190
- ^{1} French Land Register data, which excludes lakes, ponds, glaciers > 1 km^{2} (0.386 sq mi or 247 acres) and river estuaries.

Veauville-lès-Baons (French pronunciation: [vovil lɛ bɑ̃], lit. 'Veauville near Baons') is a former commune in the Seine-Maritime department in the Normandy region in northern France. On 1 January 2019, it was merged into the new commune Les Hauts-de-Caux.

== Geography ==
A farming village situated in the Pays de Caux, some 24 miles (39 km) northwest of Rouen at the junction of the C5 with the D37 road. The A29 autoroute passes through the commune's borders.

== Places of interest ==
- The church of St. Austreberthe, dating from the sixteenth century.
- The chapel of St. Gilles, dating from the fifteenth century.
- A sixteenth-century stone cross at the crossroads.
- A 30-foot high granite cross, erected in 1874.

== Notable people ==
Claudine Loquen(1965-), painter and sculptor has lived in Veauville-lès-Baons (from 1976 to 2007)

== See also ==
- Communes of the Seine-Maritime department
