= Autretot =

- Part of Les Hauts-de-Caux
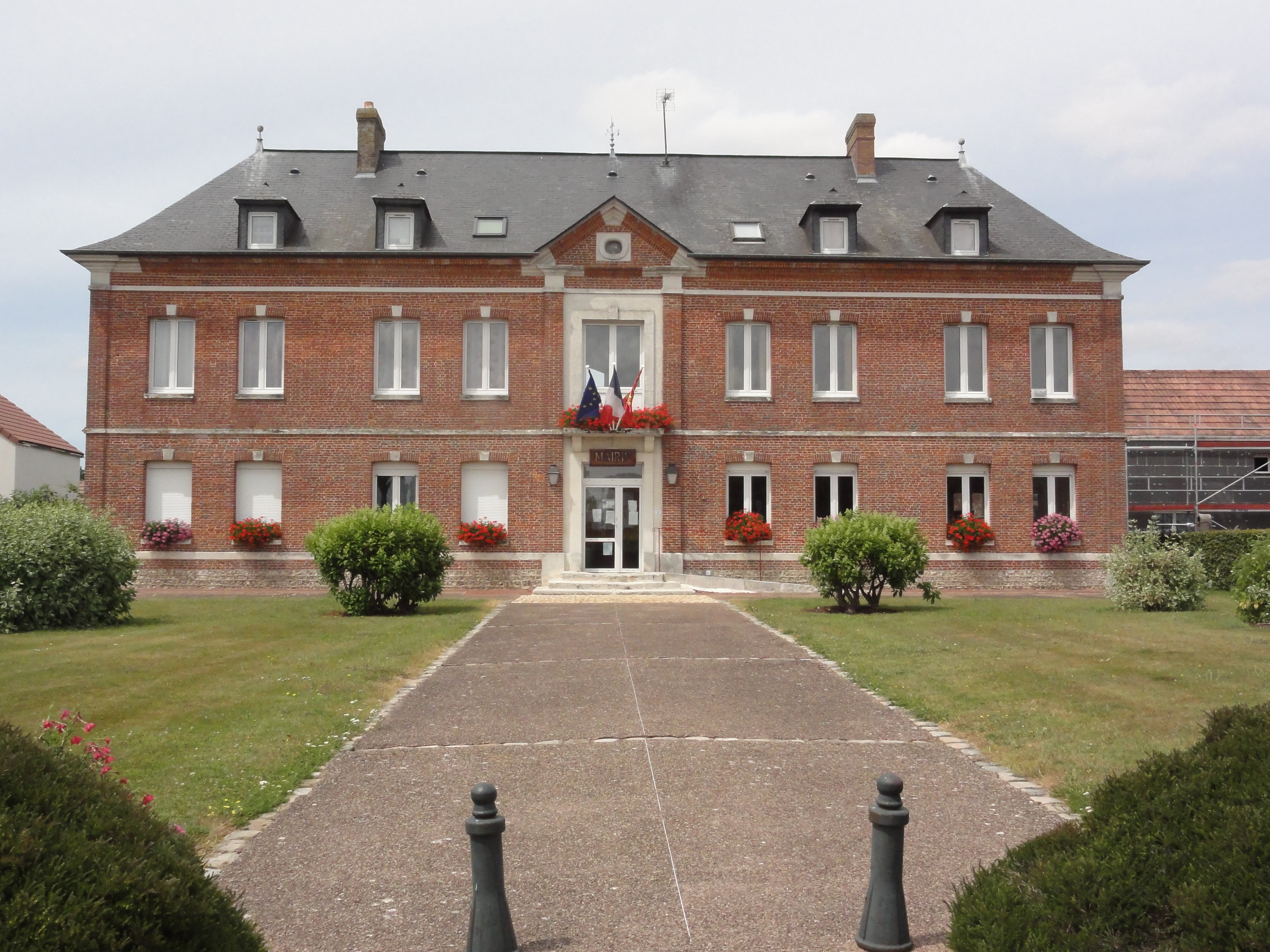
- Town hall
- Location of Autretot
- Location within France Location within Normandy
- Coordinates: 49°39′08″N 0°43′55″E
- Country: France
- Region: Normandy
- Department: Seine-Maritime
- Arrondissement: Rouen
- Canton: Yvetot
- Commune: Les Hauts-de-Caux
- Area^{1}: 3.8 km^{2} (1.5 sq mi)
- Elevation: 149 m (489 ft)
- Highest elevation: 152 m (499 ft)
- Lowest elevation: 126 m (413 ft)
- Population (2023): 654
  - Density: 170/km^{2} (450/sq mi)
- Time zone: UTC+01:00 (CET)
  - Summer (DST): UTC+02:00 (CEST)
- Postal code: 76190
- ^{1} French Land Register data, which excludes lakes, ponds, glaciers > 1 km^{2} (0.386 sq mi or 247 acres) and river estuaries.

Autretot (French pronunciation: [otʁəto]) is a former commune in the Seine-Maritime department in the Normandy region in northern France. On 1 January 2019, it was merged into the new commune Les Hauts-de-Caux.

== Geography ==
A farming village situated in the Pays de Caux, some 23 miles (37 km) northwest of Rouen on the D131 road. The commune has the distinction of having been awarded the Grand Prix and four flowers for its floral display.

== Places of interest ==
- The church of Notre-Dame, dating from the eighteenth century.

== See also ==
- Communes of the Seine-Maritime department
