= Écretteville-lès-Baons =

- Commune
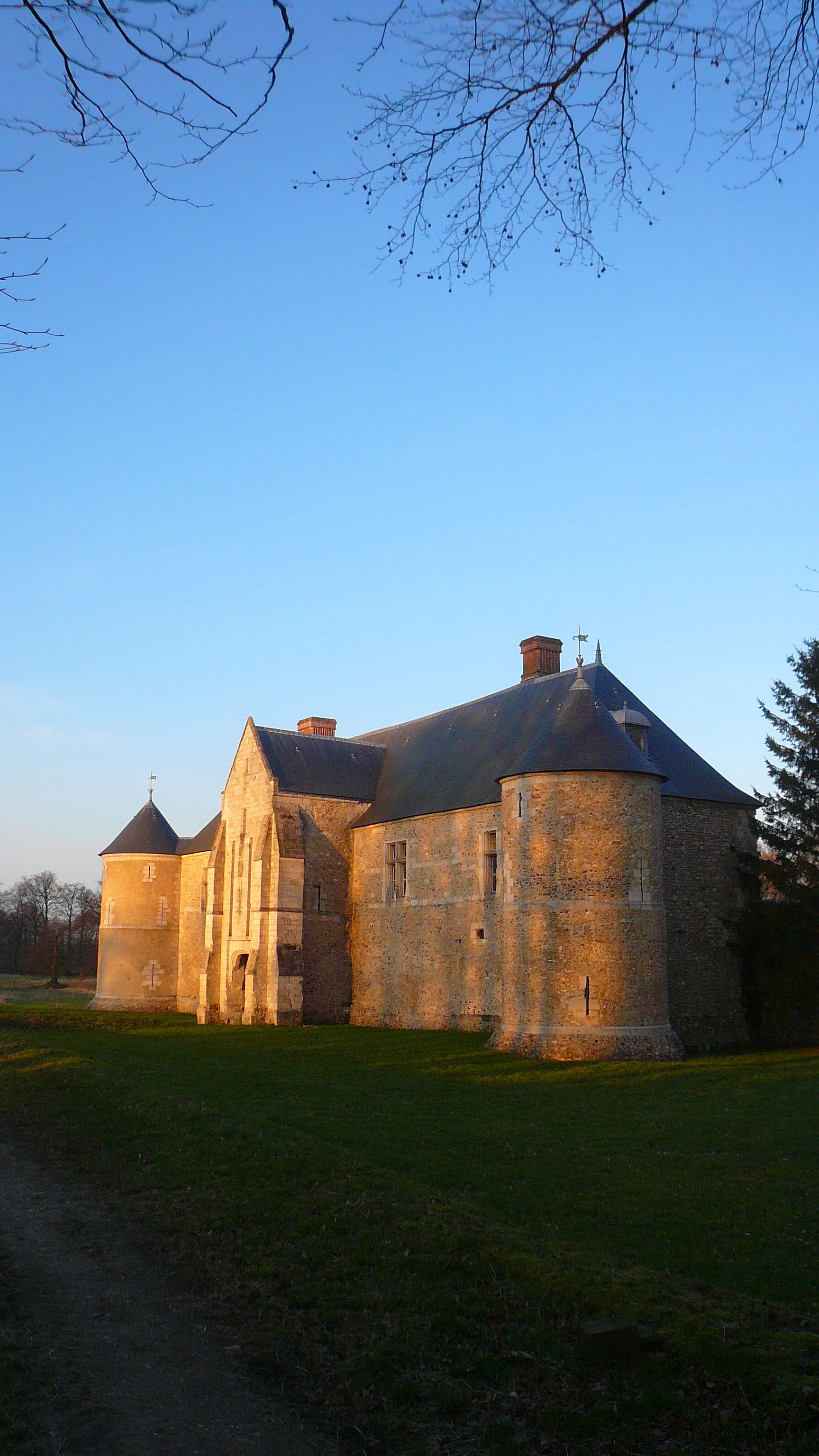
- The manor in Écretteville-lès-Baons

- Coat of arms
- Location of Écretteville-lès-Baons
- Location within France Location within Normandy
- Coordinates: 49°37′39″N 0°41′00″E
- Country: France
- Region: Normandy
- Department: Seine-Maritime
- Arrondissement: Rouen
- Canton: Yvetot

Government
  - Mayor (2020–2026): Eric Renée
- Area^{1}: 9.39 km^{2} (3.63 sq mi)
- Elevation: 130 m (430 ft)
- Highest elevation: 139 m (456 ft)
- Lowest elevation: 107 m (351 ft)
- Population (2023): 357
  - Density: 38.0/km^{2} (98.5/sq mi)
- Time zone: UTC+01:00 (CET)
  - Summer (DST): UTC+02:00 (CEST)
- INSEE/Postal code: 76225 /76190
- ^{1} French Land Register data, which excludes lakes, ponds, glaciers > 1 km^{2} (0.386 sq mi or 247 acres) and river estuaries.

Écretteville-lès-Baons (French pronunciation: [ekʁɛtvil lɛ bɑ̃], lit. 'Écretteville near Baons') is a commune in the Seine-Maritime department in the Normandy region of northern France.

== Geography ==
A farming village situated in the Pays de Caux, some 26 miles (42 km) northwest of Rouen near the junction of the D110 with the D6015 road.

== Population ==
Historical population
Year	Pop.	±% p.a.
1968	354	—
1975	381	+1.06%
1982	376	−0.19%
1990	398	+0.71%
1999	420	+0.60%
2007	417	−0.09%
2012	394	−1.13%
2017	387	−0.36%
2023	357	−1.34%
Source: INSEE

== Places of interest ==
- The church of St. Blaise, dating from the thirteenth century.
- The fortified manorhouse du Catel, dating from the thirteenth century.

== See also ==
- Communes of the Seine-Maritime department
