= Ectot-lès-Baons =

- Commune
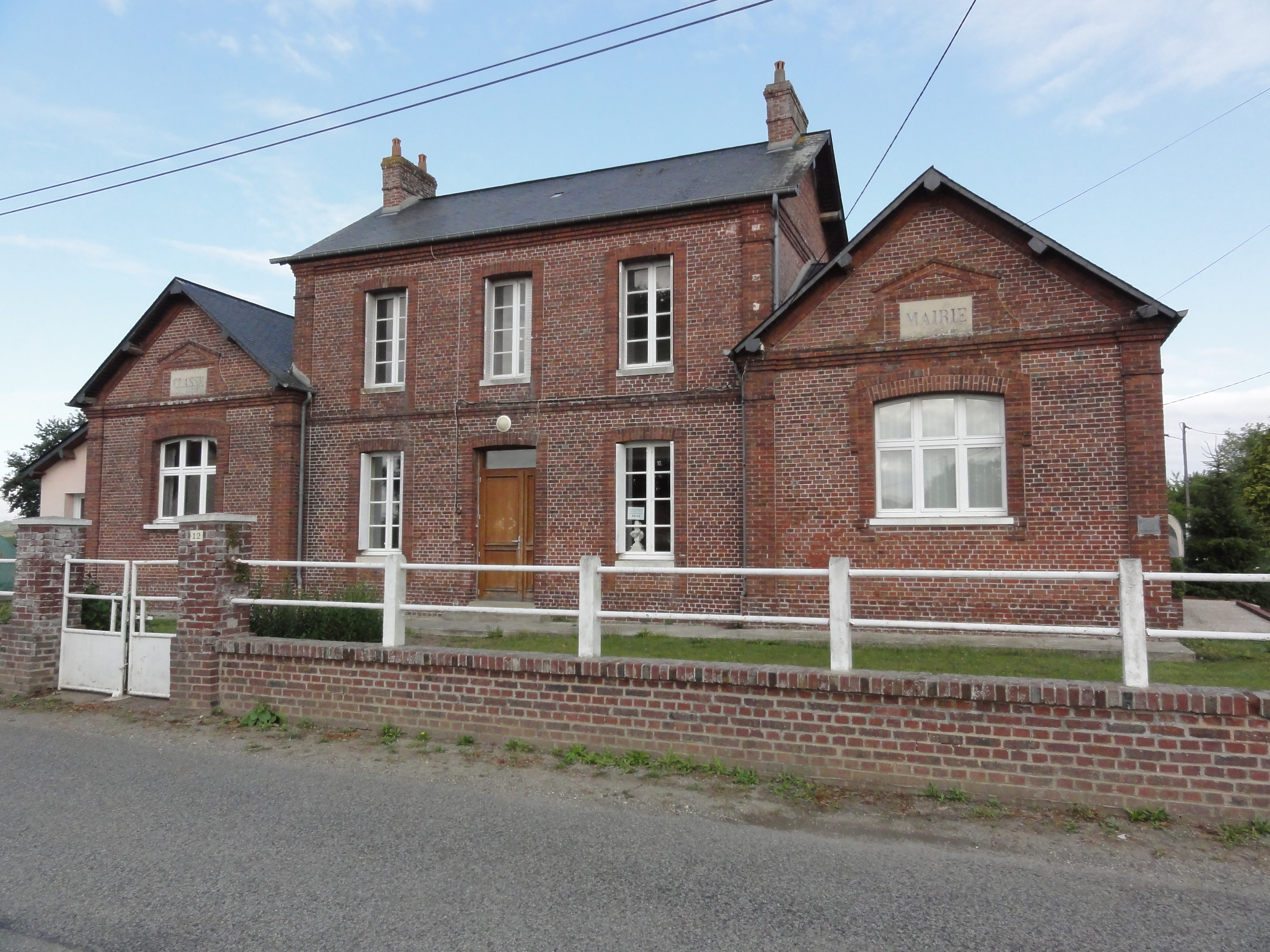
- Town hall
- Location of Ectot-lès-Baons
- Location within France Location within Normandy
- Coordinates: 49°38′37″N 0°48′28″E
- Country: France
- Region: Normandy
- Department: Seine-Maritime
- Arrondissement: Rouen
- Canton: Yvetot
- Intercommunality: CC Plateau de Caux

Government
  - Mayor (2020–2026): Claude Bouteiller
- Area^{1}: 4.92 km^{2} (1.90 sq mi)
- Elevation: 150 m (490 ft)
- Highest elevation: 151 m (495 ft)
- Lowest elevation: 132 m (433 ft)
- Population (2023): 398
  - Density: 80.9/km^{2} (210/sq mi)
- Time zone: UTC+01:00 (CET)
  - Summer (DST): UTC+02:00 (CEST)
- INSEE/Postal code: 76228 /76970
- ^{1} French Land Register data, which excludes lakes, ponds, glaciers > 1 km^{2} (0.386 sq mi or 247 acres) and river estuaries.

Ectot-lès-Baons (French pronunciation: [ɛkto lɛ bɑ̃], lit. 'Ectot near Baons') is a commune in the Seine-Maritime department in the Normandy region in northern France.

== Geography ==
A farming village situated some 21 miles (34 km) northwest of Rouen at the junction of the D55 and the D240 roads. The commune is crossed by two major roads: the A151 autoroute to the southwest and the A29 autoroute on the northern border.

== Population ==
Historical population
Year	Pop.	±% p.a.
1968	232	—
1975	317	+4.56%
1982	355	+1.63%
1990	355	+0.00%
1999	383	+0.85%
2007	408	+0.79%
2012	397	−0.55%
2017	394	−0.15%
2023	398	+0.17%
Source: INSEE

== Places of interest ==
- The church of Notre-Dame, dating from the thirteenth century.

== See also ==
- Communes of the Seine-Maritime department
