= Sainte-Marie-des-Champs =

- Commune
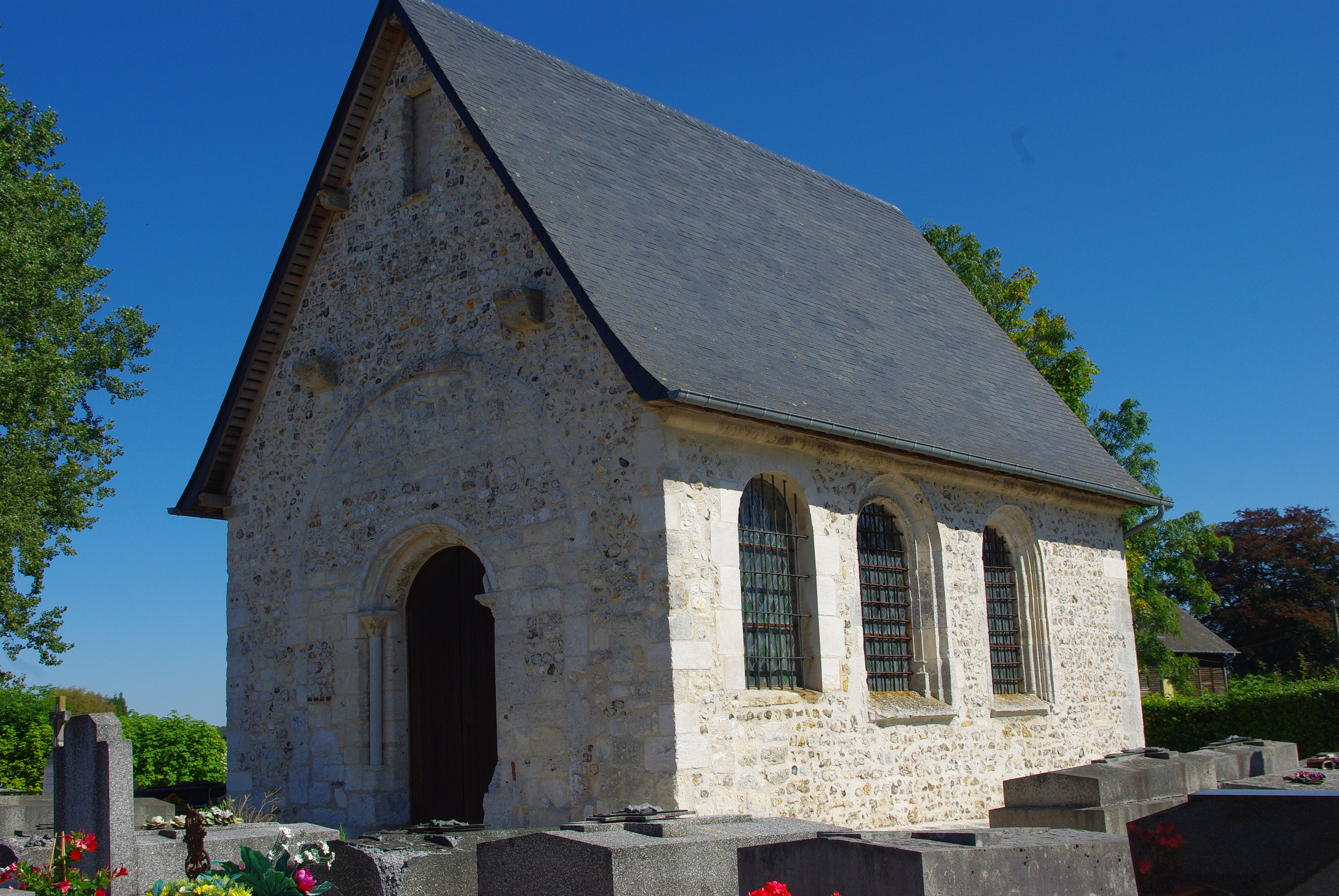
- The chapel in Sainte-Marie-des-Champs
- Location of Sainte-Marie-des-Champs
- Location within France Location within Normandy
- Coordinates: 49°37′28″N 0°46′48″E
- Country: France
- Region: Normandy
- Department: Seine-Maritime
- Arrondissement: Rouen
- Canton: Yvetot

Government
  - Mayor (2026–32): Michael Dodelin
- Area^{1}: 4.11 km^{2} (1.59 sq mi)
- Elevation: 147 m (482 ft)
- Highest elevation: 156 m (512 ft)
- Lowest elevation: 100 m (330 ft)
- Population (2023): 1,562
  - Density: 380/km^{2} (984/sq mi)
- Time zone: UTC+01:00 (CET)
  - Summer (DST): UTC+02:00 (CEST)
- INSEE/Postal code: 76610 /76190
- ^{1} French Land Register data, which excludes lakes, ponds, glaciers > 1 km^{2} (0.386 sq mi or 247 acres) and river estuaries.

Sainte-Marie-des-Champs (French pronunciation: [sɛ̃t maʁi de ʃɑ̃]) is a commune in the Seine-Maritime department in the Normandy region in northern France.

== Geography ==
The commune is an eastern suburb of Yvetot, in the Pays de Caux, some 21 miles (34 km) northwest of Rouen on the D37, D55 and D6015 roads. Farming and light industry are the primary occupations.

== Population ==
Historical population
| Year | Pop. | ±% p.a. |
|---|---|---|
| 1968 | 501 | — |
| 1975 | 631 | +3.35% |
| 1982 | 1,238 | +10.11% |
| 1990 | 1,462 | +2.10% |
| 1999 | 1,554 | +0.68% |
| 2007 | 1,542 | −0.10% |
| 2012 | 1,490 | −0.68% |
| 2017 | 1,582 | +1.21% |
| 2023 | 1,562 | −0.21% |
Source: INSEE

== Places of interest ==
- The church of St.Marie, dating from the nineteenth century.
- The Chapelle du Fay.

== See also ==
- Communes of the Seine-Maritime department
