= Amfreville-les-Champs, Seine-Maritime =

Amfreville-les-Champs
- Commune
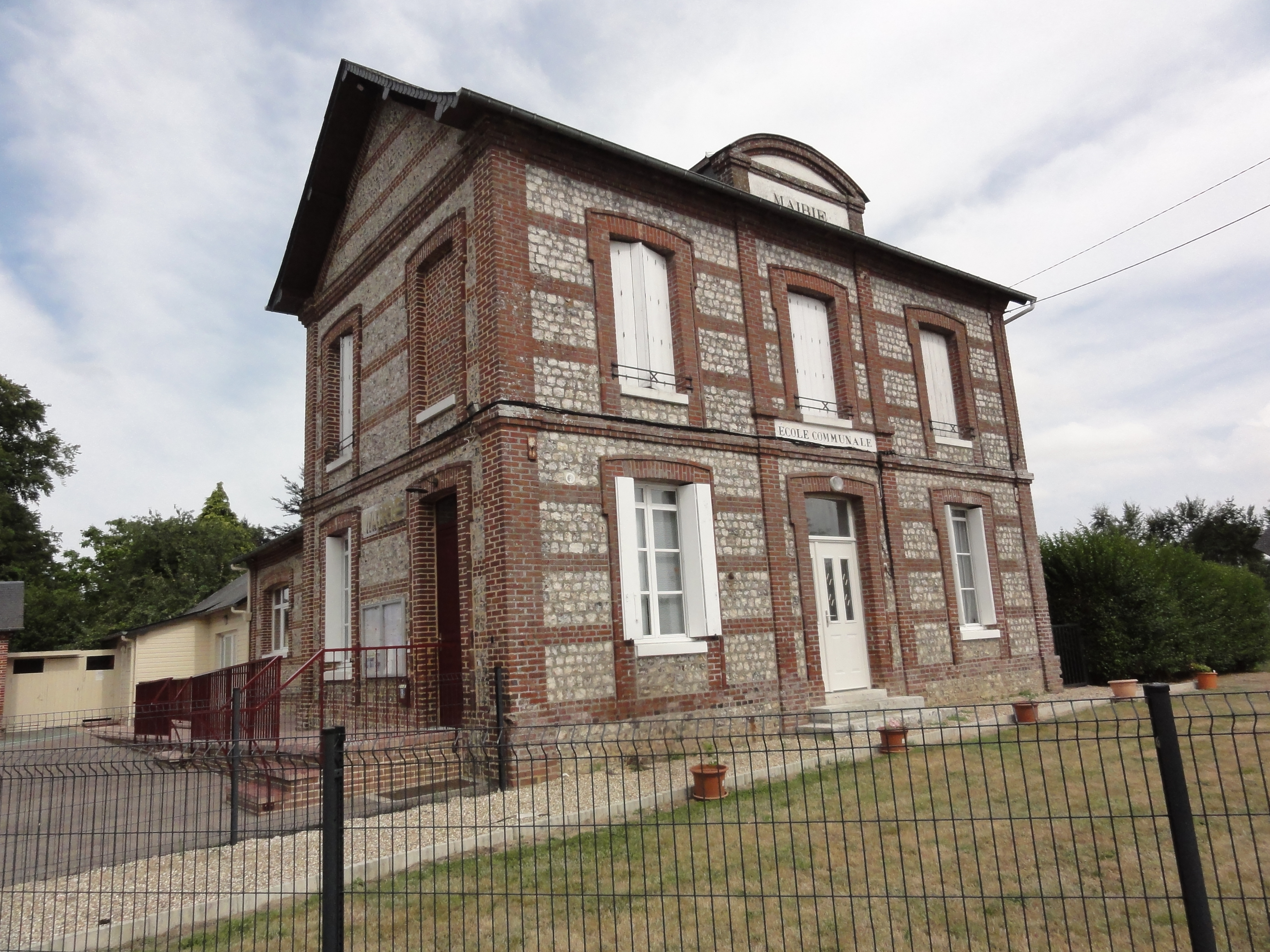
- Amfreville-les-Champs (Seine-Mar.) Town hall
- Location of Amfreville-les-Champs
- Location within France Location within Normandy
- Coordinates: 49°41′54″N 0°49′06″E
- Country: France
- Region: Normandy
- Department: Seine-Maritime
- Arrondissement: Rouen
- Canton: Yvetot
- Intercommunality: CC Plateau de Caux

Government
  - Mayor (2020–2026): Alain Lebouc
- Area^{1}: 4.6 km^{2} (1.8 sq mi)
- Elevation: 137 m (449 ft)
- Highest elevation: 167 m (548 ft)
- Lowest elevation: 141 m (463 ft)
- Population (2023): 188
  - Density: 41/km^{2} (110/sq mi)
- Time zone: UTC+01:00 (CET)
  - Summer (DST): UTC+02:00 (CEST)
- INSEE/Postal code: 76006 /76560
- ^{1} French Land Register data, which excludes lakes, ponds, glaciers > 1 km^{2} (0.386 sq mi or 247 acres) and river estuaries.

Amfreville-les-Champs (French pronunciation: [ɑ̃fʁəvil le ʃɑ̃]) is a commune in the Seine-Maritime department in the Normandy region in northern France.

== Geography ==
A very small farming village situated in the Pays de Caux, some 23 miles (37 km) southwest of Dieppe at the junction of the D20, D27 and D89 roads.

== Population ==
Historical population
Year	Pop.	±% p.a.
1968	105	—
1975	96	−1.27%
1982	80	−2.57%
1990	111	+4.18%
1999	99	−1.26%
2007	138	+4.24%
2012	181	+5.57%
2017	171	−1.13%
2023	188	+1.59%
Source: INSEE

== Places of interest ==
- The thirteenth century church of St.Pierre.

== See also ==
- Communes of the Seine-Maritime department
