= Valliquerville =

- Commune
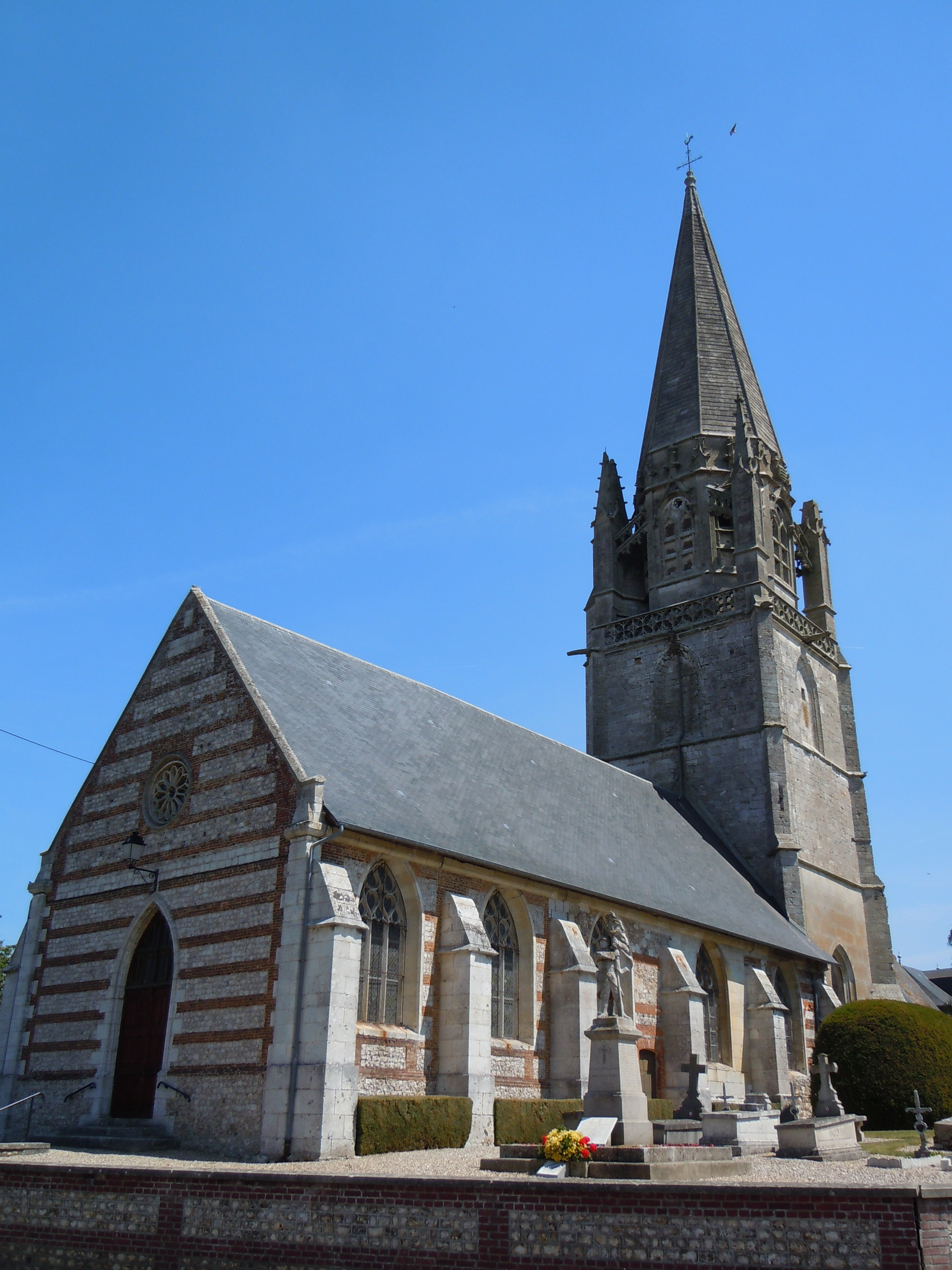
- The church in Valliquerville

- Coat of arms
- Location of Valliquerville
- Location within France Location within Normandy
- Coordinates: 49°36′52″N 0°41′25″E
- Country: France
- Region: Normandy
- Department: Seine-Maritime
- Arrondissement: Rouen
- Canton: Yvetot

Government
  - Mayor (2026–32): Jacques Cahard
- Area^{1}: 13.39 km^{2} (5.17 sq mi)
- Elevation: 120 m (390 ft)
- Highest elevation: 151 m (495 ft)
- Lowest elevation: 117 m (384 ft)
- Population (2023): 1,494
  - Density: 111.6/km^{2} (289.0/sq mi)
- Time zone: UTC+01:00 (CET)
  - Summer (DST): UTC+02:00 (CEST)
- INSEE/Postal code: 76718 /76190
- ^{1} French Land Register data, which excludes lakes, ponds, glaciers > 1 km^{2} (0.386 sq mi or 247 acres) and river estuaries.

Valliquerville (French pronunciation: [valikɛʁvil]) is a commune in the Seine-Maritime department in the Normandy region in northern France.

== Geography ==
A farming village situated in the Pays de Caux, some 25 miles (40 km) northwest of Rouen at the junction of the D6015 with the D131e and the D110 roads.

== History ==
In the late eleventh century the village was in the possession of Bec Abbey.

In May 1592, Henry IV and his forces were encamped in the village during the French Wars of Religion.

In April 1940, during World War II Princess Louise's Kensington Regiment was billeted in the village as part of the British Expeditionary Force.

== Heraldry ==
Arms of Valliquerville	The arms of the commune of Valliquerville are blazoned : Per pale highly indented argent and gules impaled with Vert, the local bell-tower argent issuant from base.

== Population ==
Historical population
Year	Pop.	±% p.a.
1968	769	—
1975	870	+1.78%
1982	980	+1.72%
1990	1,125	+1.74%
1999	1,164	+0.38%
2007	1,267	+1.07%
2012	1,294	+0.42%
2017	1,418	+1.85%
2023	1,494	+0.87%
Source: INSEE

== Places of interest ==
- The church of Notre-Dame, dating from the thirteenth century. Its Gothic tower dates from the sixteenth century. It has been restored after being in a state of disrepair in the mid nineteenth century.

== See also ==
- Communes of the Seine-Maritime department
