= Auzebosc =

- Commune
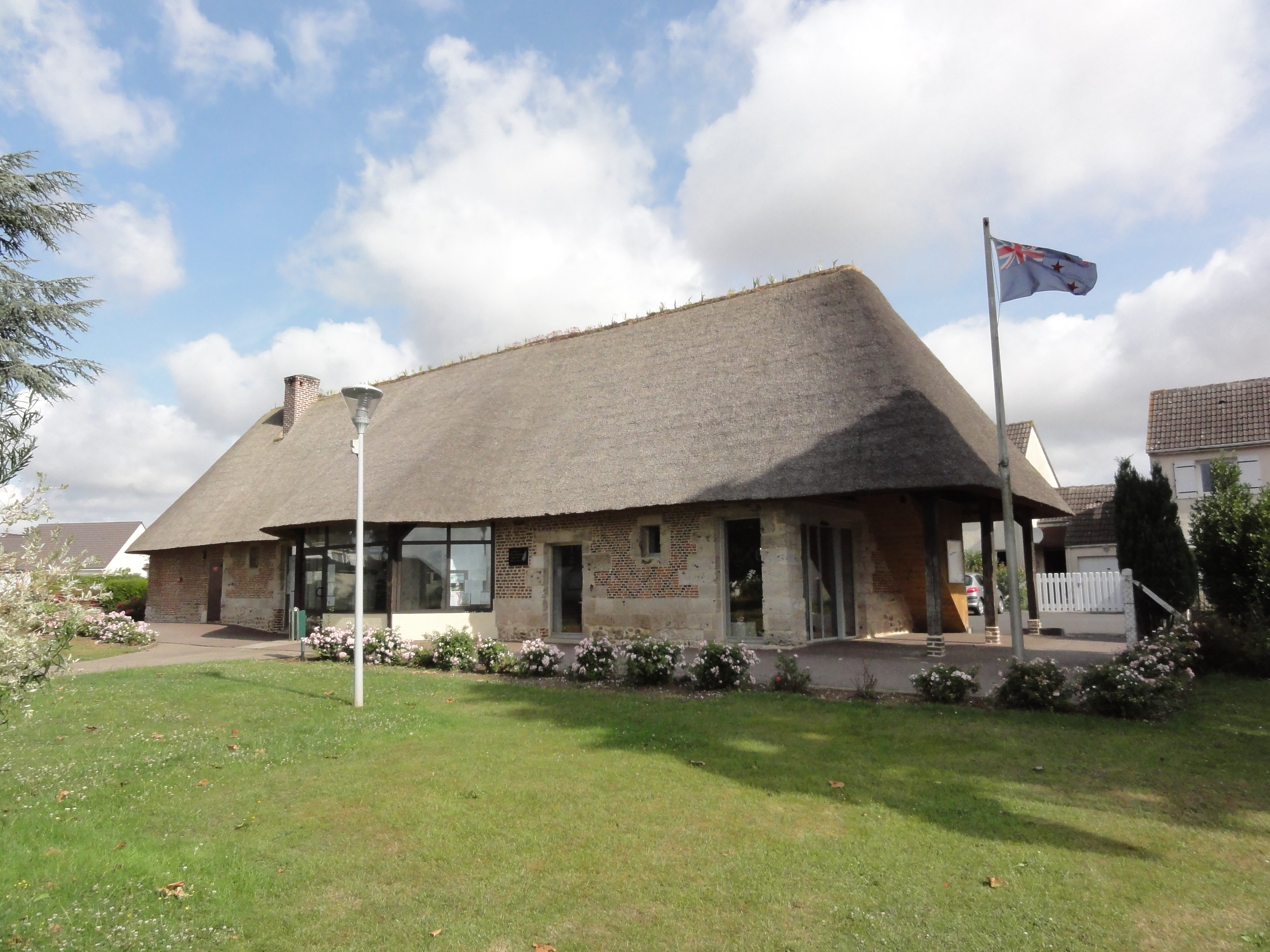
- Auzebosc Town hall

- Coat of arms
- Location of Auzebosc
- Location within France Location within Normandy
- Coordinates: 49°35′49″N 0°43′40″E
- Country: France
- Region: Normandy
- Department: Seine-Maritime
- Arrondissement: Rouen
- Canton: Yvetot
- Intercommunality: Yvetot Normandie

Government
  - Mayor (2020–2026): Dominique Macé
- Area^{1}: 4.76 km^{2} (1.84 sq mi)
- Elevation: 135 m (443 ft)
- Highest elevation: 142 m (466 ft)
- Lowest elevation: 94 m (308 ft)
- Population (2023): 1,116
  - Density: 234/km^{2} (607/sq mi)
- Time zone: UTC+01:00 (CET)
  - Summer (DST): UTC+02:00 (CEST)
- INSEE/Postal code: 76043 /76190
- ^{1} French Land Register data, which excludes lakes, ponds, glaciers > 1 km^{2} (0.386 sq mi or 247 acres) and river estuaries.

Auzebosc (French pronunciation: [ozbɔsk]) is a commune in the Seine-Maritime department in the Normandy region in northern France.

== Geography ==
A village of farming and associated light industry situated in the Pays de Caux, some 24 miles (39 km) northwest of Rouen on the D131 road.

== Heraldry ==
Arms of Auzebosc	The arms of Auzebosc are blazoned : Paly Or and gules.

== Population ==
Historical population
Year	Pop.	±% p.a.
1968	388	—
1975	576	+5.81%
1982	738	+3.60%
1990	755	+0.29%
1999	963	+2.74%
2007	1,015	+0.66%
2012	1,070	+1.06%
2017	1,123	+0.97%
2023	1,116	−0.10%
Source: INSEE

== Places of interest ==
- The ruins of a 15th-century castle.
- An eighteenth-century château.
- A seventeenth-century stone cross.
- The church of St.Jean-Baptiste, dating from the sixteenth century.

== See also ==
- Communes of the Seine-Maritime department
