= Anvéville =

- Commune
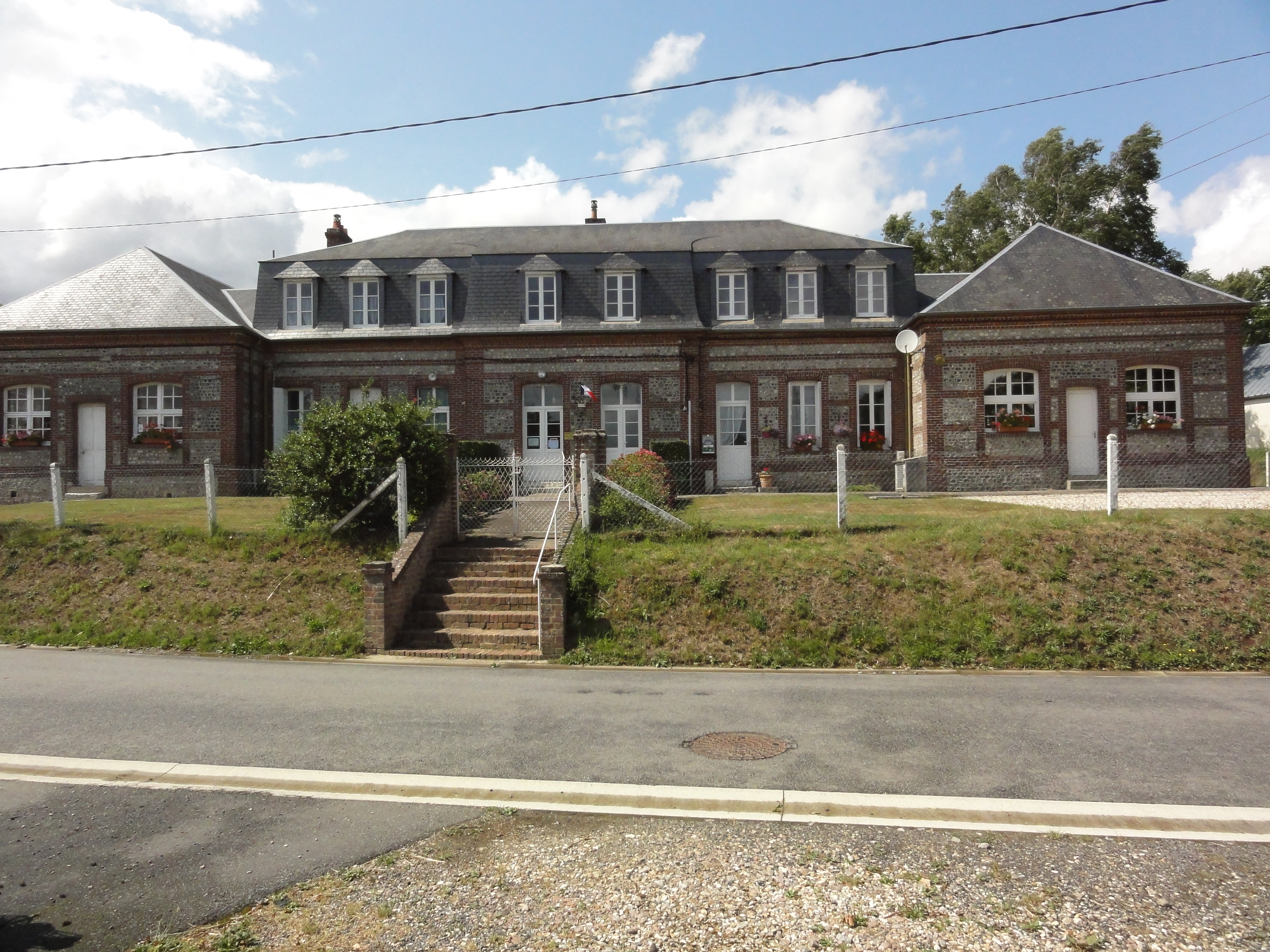
- Anvéville Town hall
- Location of Anvéville
- Location within France Location within Normandy
- Coordinates: 49°41′59″N 0°44′21″E
- Country: France
- Region: Normandy
- Department: Seine-Maritime
- Arrondissement: Rouen
- Canton: Yvetot
- Intercommunality: CC Plateau de Caux

Government
  - Mayor (2026–32): David Neveu
- Area^{1}: 4.23 km^{2} (1.63 sq mi)
- Elevation: 115 m (377 ft)
- Highest elevation: 152 m (499 ft)
- Lowest elevation: 87 m (285 ft)
- Population (2023): 291
  - Density: 68.8/km^{2} (178/sq mi)
- Time zone: UTC+01:00 (CET)
  - Summer (DST): UTC+02:00 (CEST)
- INSEE/Postal code: 76023 /76560
- ^{1} French Land Register data, which excludes lakes, ponds, glaciers > 1 km^{2} (0.386 sq mi or 247 acres) and river estuaries.

Anvéville (French pronunciation: [ɑ̃vevil]) is a commune in the Seine-Maritime department in the Normandy region in northern France.

== Geography ==
A small farming village situated in the Pays de Caux, some 32 miles (51 km) northeast of Le Havre, between the D110 and the D142.

== Population ==
Historical population
Year	Pop.	±% p.a.
1968	241	—
1975	201	−2.56%
1982	201	+0.00%
1990	195	−0.38%
1999	247	+2.66%
2007	249	+0.10%
2012	283	+2.59%
2017	295	+0.83%
2023	291	−0.23%
Source: INSEE

== Places of interest ==
- The church of St.Pierre, dating from the twelfth century.
- Ruins of a medieval castle.

== See also ==
- Communes of the Seine-Maritime department
