= Bois-Himont =

- Commune
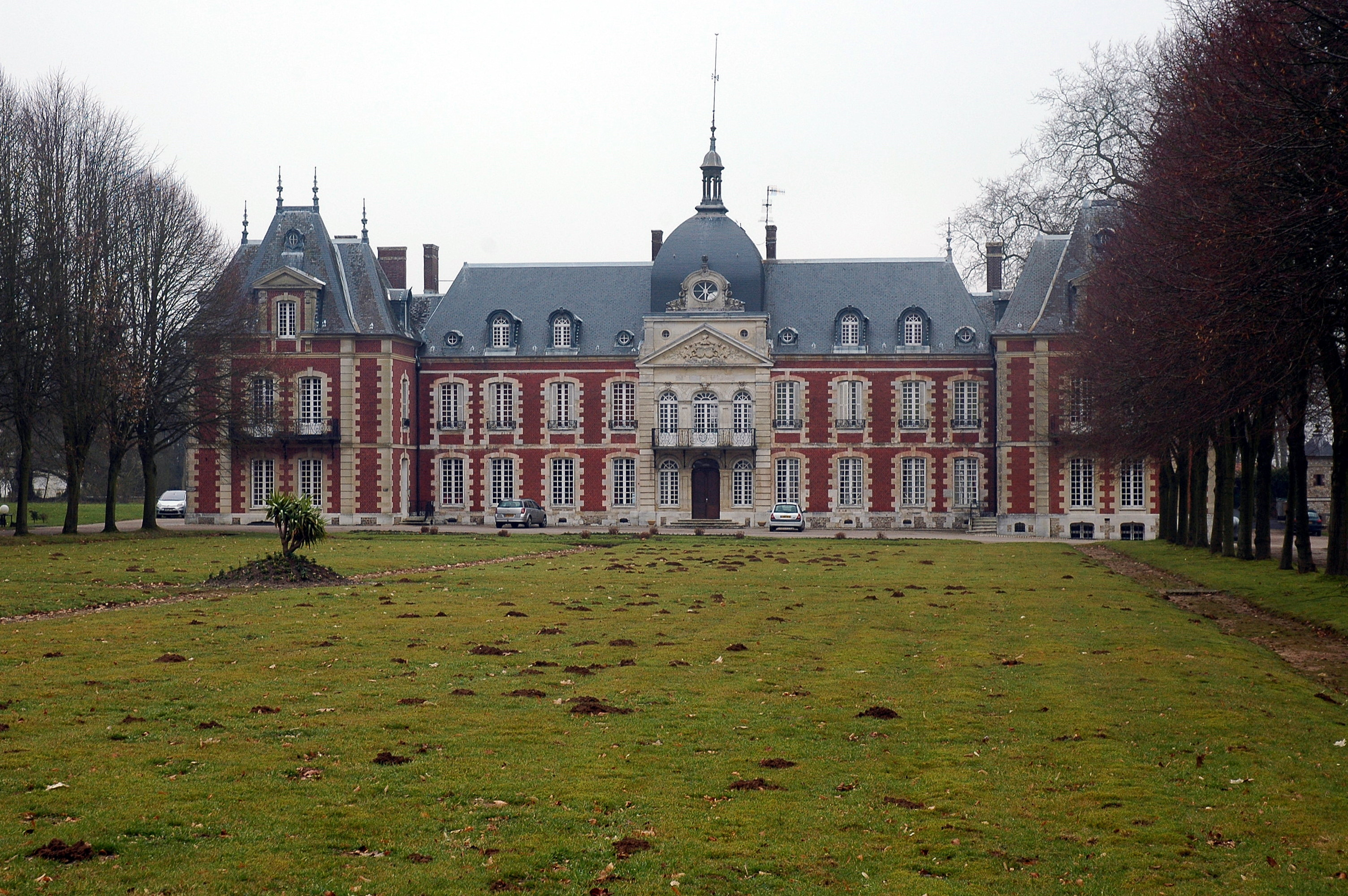
- The chateau in Bois-Himont

- Coat of arms
- Location of Bois-Himont
- Location within France Location within Normandy
- Coordinates: 49°35′08″N 0°42′10″E
- Country: France
- Region: Normandy
- Department: Seine-Maritime
- Arrondissement: Rouen
- Canton: Yvetot

Government
  - Mayor (2026–32): Louis Eudier
- Area^{1}: 5.84 km^{2} (2.25 sq mi)
- Elevation: 140 m (460 ft)
- Highest elevation: 150 m (490 ft)
- Lowest elevation: 65 m (213 ft)
- Population (2023): 436
  - Density: 74.7/km^{2} (193/sq mi)
- Time zone: UTC+01:00 (CET)
  - Summer (DST): UTC+02:00 (CEST)
- INSEE/Postal code: 76110 /76190
- ^{1} French Land Register data, which excludes lakes, ponds, glaciers > 1 km^{2} (0.386 sq mi or 247 acres) and river estuaries.

Bois-Himont (French pronunciation: [bwa imɔ̃]) is a commune in the Seine-Maritime department in the Normandy region in northern France.

== Geography ==
A farming village situated in the Pays de Caux, some 28 miles (45 km) northwest of Rouen at the junction of the D104 and the D33 roads.

== Population ==
Historical population
Year	Pop.	±% p.a.
1968	193	—
1975	182	−0.83%
1982	312	+8.00%
1990	334	+0.86%
1999	392	+1.80%
2007	427	+1.07%
2012	464	+1.68%
2017	460	−0.17%
2023	436	−0.89%
Source: INSEE

== Places of interest ==
- The church of St.Laurent, dating from the thirteenth century.
- A fifteenth-century chapel.
- The eighteenth-century chateau, nowadays a hotel and conference centre.

== See also ==
- Communes of the Seine-Maritime department
