= Les Hauts-de-Caux =

- Commune
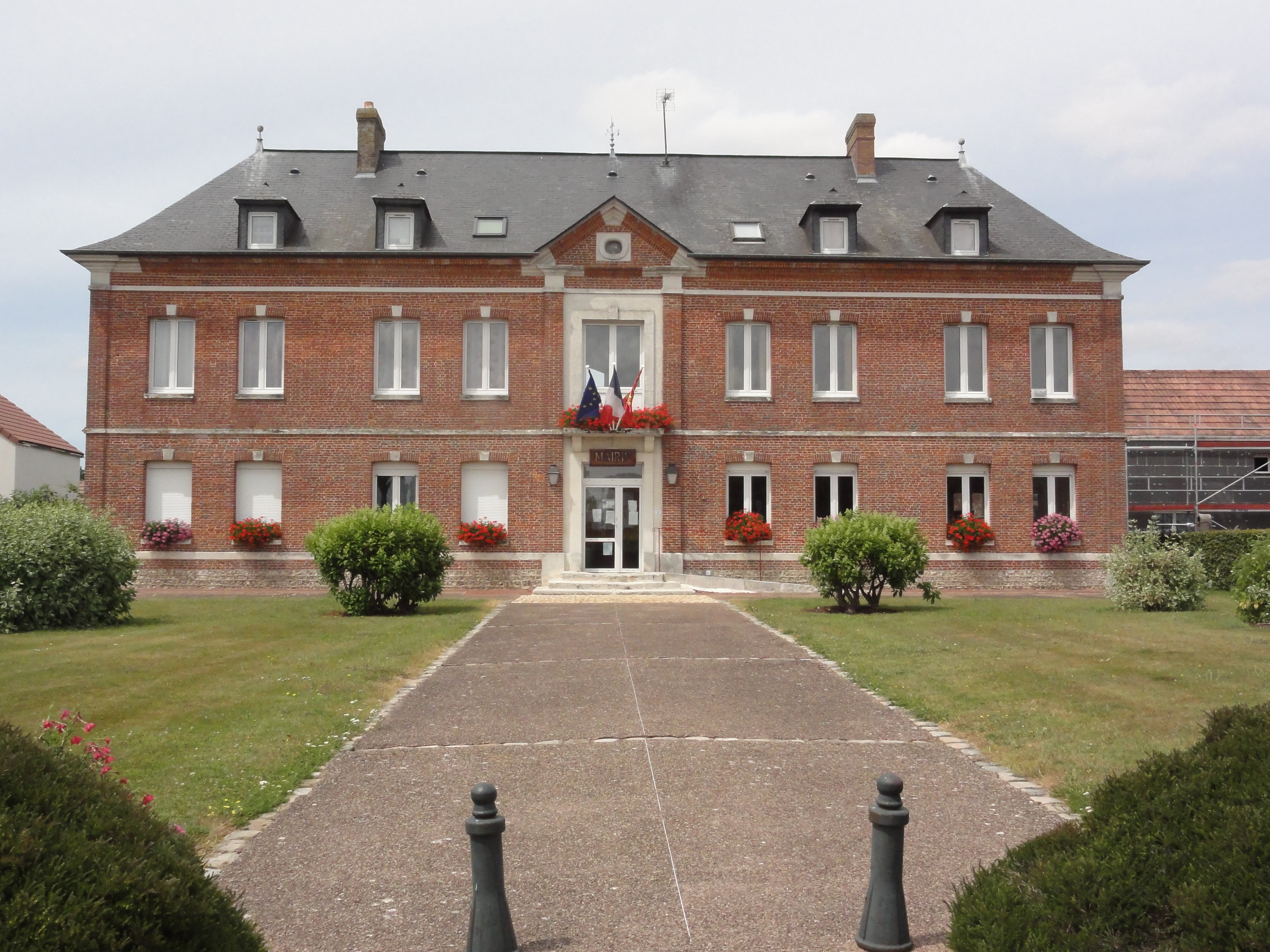
- Les Hauts-de-Caux Town hall
- Location of Les Hauts-de-Caux
- Location within France Location within Normandy
- Coordinates: 49°39′08″N 0°43′55″E
- Country: France
- Region: Normandy
- Department: Seine-Maritime
- Arrondissement: Rouen
- Canton: Yvetot
- Intercommunality: Yvetot Normandie

Government
  - Mayor (2026–32): Lorena Tuna
- Area^{1}: 11.76 km^{2} (4.54 sq mi)
- Highest elevation: 152 m (499 ft)
- Lowest elevation: 118 m (387 ft)
- Population (2023): 1,331
  - Density: 113.2/km^{2} (293.1/sq mi)
- Time zone: UTC+01:00 (CET)
  - Summer (DST): UTC+02:00 (CEST)
- INSEE/Postal code: 76041 /76190
- ^{1} French Land Register data, which excludes lakes, ponds, glaciers > 1 km^{2} (0.386 sq mi or 247 acres) and river estuaries.

Les Hauts-de-Caux (French pronunciation: [le o də ko]) is a commune in the Seine-Maritime department in the Normandy region in northern France. It was established on 1 January 2019 by merger of the former communes of Autretot (the seat) and Veauville-lès-Baons.

== Population ==
Population data refer to the area corresponding with the commune as of January 2025.

Historical population
Year	Pop.	±% p.a.
1968	675	—
1975	994	+5.68%
1982	1,177	+2.44%
1990	1,345	+1.68%
1999	1,338	−0.06%
2007	1,353	+0.14%
2012	1,444	+1.31%
2017	1,384	−0.85%
2023	1,331	−0.65%
Source: INSEE

== Places and monuments ==
- church of Sainte-Austreberthe (Veauville-les-Baons)
- church of Notre-Dame (Autretot)
- war memorial (Autretot)
- the charreterie (Autretot)

== See also ==
- Communes of the Seine-Maritime department
