= Saint-Clair-sur-les-Monts =

- Commune
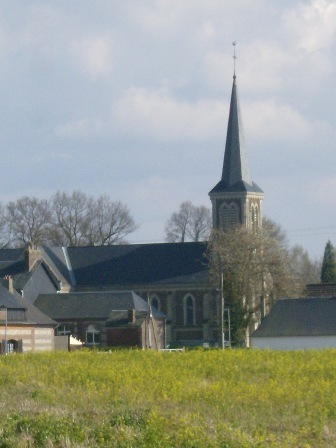
- The church in Saint-Clair-sur-les-Monts

- Coat of arms
- Location of Saint-Clair-sur-les-Monts
- Location within France Location within Normandy
- Coordinates: 49°36′28″N 0°47′12″E
- Country: France
- Region: Normandy
- Department: Seine-Maritime
- Arrondissement: Rouen
- Canton: Yvetot

Government
  - Mayor (2026–32): Mario Demaziéres
- Area^{1}: 4.07 km^{2} (1.57 sq mi)
- Elevation: 125 m (410 ft)
- Highest elevation: 142 m (466 ft)
- Lowest elevation: 57 m (187 ft)
- Population (2023): 660
  - Density: 160/km^{2} (420/sq mi)
- Time zone: UTC+01:00 (CET)
  - Summer (DST): UTC+02:00 (CEST)
- INSEE/Postal code: 76568 /76190
- ^{1} French Land Register data, which excludes lakes, ponds, glaciers > 1 km^{2} (0.386 sq mi or 247 acres) and river estuaries.

Saint-Clair-sur-les-Monts (French pronunciation: [sɛ̃ klɛːʁ syʁ le mɔ̃]) is a commune in the Seine-Maritime department in the Normandy region in northern France.

== Geography ==
A farming village situated in the Pays de Caux, some 22 miles (35 km) northwest of Rouen near the junction of the D5 and the D131e roads.

== Heraldry ==
Arms of Saint-Clair-sur-les-Monts	The arms of Saint-Clair-sur-les-Monts are blazoned : Argent, on a bend gules between a garb [of wheat] and a lion vert, a buckle between 2 mullets of 5 all palewise Or.

== Population ==
Historical population
Year	Pop.	±% p.a.
1968	291	—
1975	385	+4.08%
1982	411	+0.94%
1990	484	+2.06%
1999	560	+1.63%
2007	646	+1.80%
2012	641	−0.16%
2017	591	−1.61%
2023	660	+1.86%
Source: INSEE

== Places of interest ==
The cross

- The church of St.Clair, dating from the thirteenth century.
- A fifteenth century manorhouse.
- The 3 Châteaux (de Marseille, Mézerville and de Taillanville).
- A sixteenth-century stone cross.

== See also ==
- Communes of the Seine-Maritime department
