= Hautot-le-Vatois =

- Commune
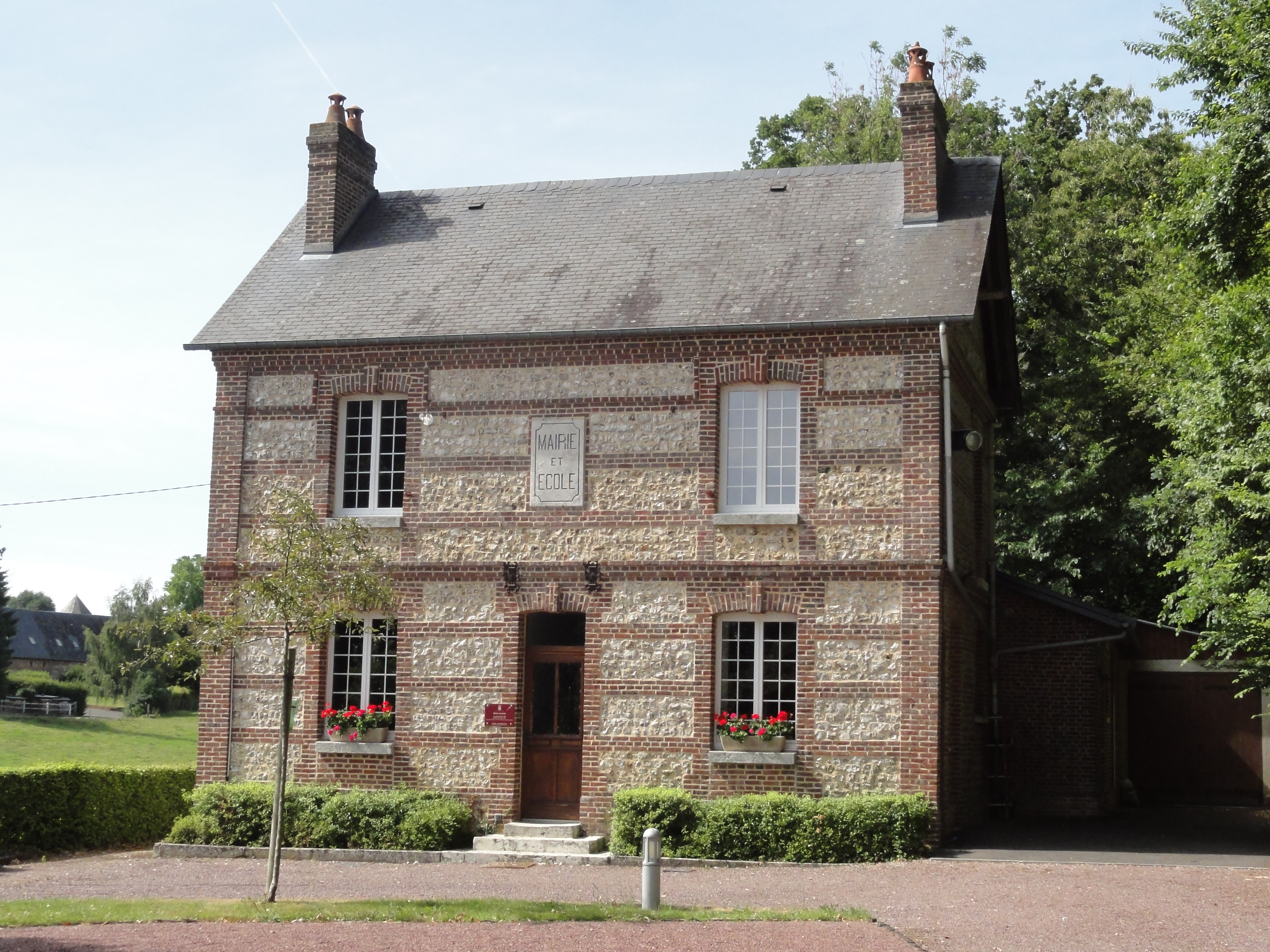
- Town hall

- Coat of arms
- Location of Hautot-le-Vatois
- Location within France Location within Normandy
- Coordinates: 49°38′51″N 0°41′24″E
- Country: France
- Region: Normandy
- Department: Seine-Maritime
- Arrondissement: Rouen
- Canton: Yvetot

Government
  - Mayor (2020–2026): Claude Bellin
- Area^{1}: 6.07 km^{2} (2.34 sq mi)
- Elevation: 139 m (456 ft)
- Highest elevation: 142 m (466 ft)
- Lowest elevation: 95 m (312 ft)
- Population (2023): 325
  - Density: 53.5/km^{2} (139/sq mi)
- Time zone: UTC+01:00 (CET)
  - Summer (DST): UTC+02:00 (CEST)
- INSEE/Postal code: 76347 /76190
- ^{1} French Land Register data, which excludes lakes, ponds, glaciers > 1 km^{2} (0.386 sq mi or 247 acres) and river estuaries.

Hautot-le-Vatois (French pronunciation: [oto lə vatwa]) is a commune in the Seine-Maritime department in the Normandy region in northern France.

== Geography ==
A small farming village situated in the Pays de Caux, some 27 miles (43 km) northeast of Le Havre, at the junction of the D5, D240 and D110 roads. The A29 autoroute passes through the commune's southern farmland.

== Population ==
Historical population
Year	Pop.	±% p.a.
1968	202	—
1975	252	+3.21%
1982	302	+2.62%
1990	295	−0.29%
1999	268	−1.06%
2007	275	+0.32%
2012	309	+2.36%
2017	354	+2.76%
2023	325	−1.41%
Source: INSEE

== Places of interest ==
- The chapel of St. Geneviève, dating from the seventeenth century.
- The twelfth century church of Notre-Dame.

== See also ==
- Communes of the Seine-Maritime department
