= Hautot-Saint-Sulpice =

- Commune
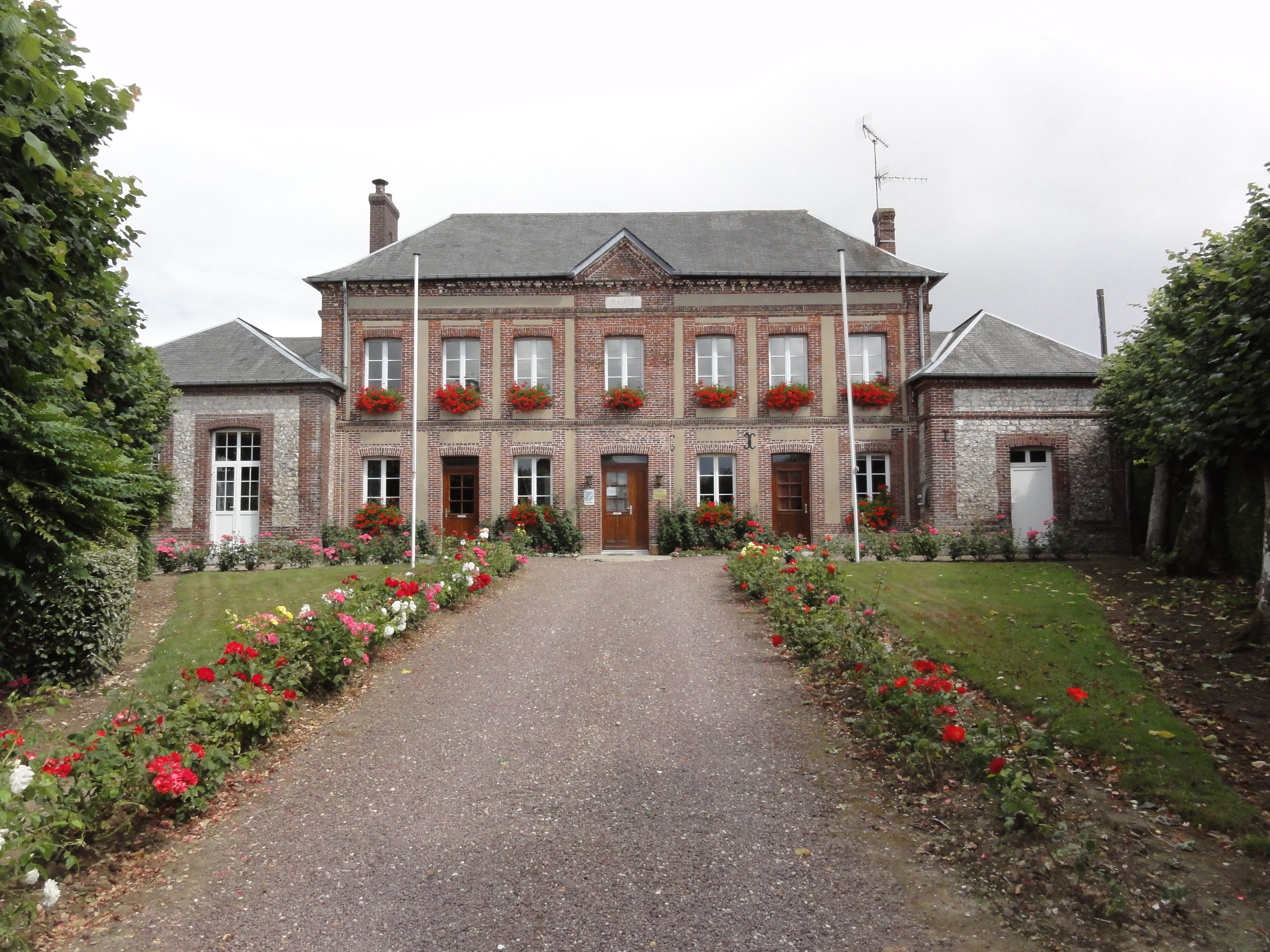
- Town hall

- Coat of arms
- Location of Hautot-Saint-Sulpice
- Location within France Location within Normandy
- Coordinates: 49°40′54″N 0°44′26″E
- Country: France
- Region: Normandy
- Department: Seine-Maritime
- Arrondissement: Rouen
- Canton: Yvetot

Government
  - Mayor (2020–2026): Vincent Lemettais
- Area^{1}: 8.53 km^{2} (3.29 sq mi)
- Elevation: 140 m (460 ft)
- Highest elevation: 148 m (486 ft)
- Lowest elevation: 75 m (246 ft)
- Population (2023): 688
  - Density: 80.7/km^{2} (209/sq mi)
- Time zone: UTC+01:00 (CET)
  - Summer (DST): UTC+02:00 (CEST)
- INSEE/Postal code: 76348 /76190
- ^{1} French Land Register data, which excludes lakes, ponds, glaciers > 1 km^{2} (0.386 sq mi or 247 acres) and river estuaries.

Hautot-Saint-Sulpice (French pronunciation: [oto sɛ̃ sylpis]) is a commune in the Seine-Maritime département in the Normandy region in northern France.

== Geography ==
Hautot-Saint-Sulpice is a small farming village situated in the Pays de Caux, some 28 miles (45 km) northeast of Le Havre, at the junction of the D53 and D10 roads.

== Population ==
Historical population
Year	Pop.	±% p.a.
1968	430	—
1975	358	−2.58%
1982	381	+0.89%
1990	496	+3.35%
1999	562	+1.40%
2007	575	+0.29%
2012	628	+1.78%
2017	678	+1.54%
2023	688	+0.24%
Source: INSEE

== Places of interest ==
- Church of St. Sulpice, dating from the 11th century
- Some 16th-century houses
- The Chaplaincy of St Mary the Virgin, part of the Anglican Catholic Church European Deanery, Currently under the Diocese of the United Kingdom, is in the Village.

== See also ==
- Communes of the Seine-Maritime department
