= Hugleville-en-Caux =

- Commune
- Coat of arms
- Location of Hugleville-en-Caux
- Location within France Location within Normandy
- Coordinates: 49°38′04″N 0°59′06″E
- Country: France
- Region: Normandy
- Department: Seine-Maritime
- Arrondissement: Rouen
- Canton: Yvetot
- Intercommunality: CC Plateau de Caux

Government
  - Mayor (2020–2026): Luc Lefrançois
- Area^{1}: 9.45 km^{2} (3.65 sq mi)
- Elevation: 150 m (490 ft)
- Highest elevation: 174 m (571 ft)
- Lowest elevation: 89 m (292 ft)
- Population (2023): 406
  - Density: 43.0/km^{2} (111/sq mi)
- Time zone: UTC+01:00 (CET)
  - Summer (DST): UTC+02:00 (CEST)
- INSEE/Postal code: 76370 /76570
- ^{1} French Land Register data, which excludes lakes, ponds, glaciers > 1 km^{2} (0.386 sq mi or 247 acres) and river estuaries.

Hugleville-en-Caux (French pronunciation: [yɡləvil ɑ̃ ko], literally Hugleville in Caux) is a commune in the Seine-Maritime department in the Normandy region in northern France.

== Geography ==
A village of forestry and farming in the Pays de Caux, situated some 14 miles (23 km) north of Rouen, at the junction of the D22, D63 and the D467 roads. The A29 autoroute just touches the commune's northern border.

== Population ==
Historical population
Year	Pop.	±% p.a.
1968	222	—
1975	230	+0.51%
1982	275	+2.59%
1990	302	+1.18%
1999	290	−0.45%
2007	361	+2.78%
2012	413	+2.73%
2017	428	+0.72%
2023	406	−0.88%
Source: INSEE

== Places of interest ==
- The church of Notre-Dame, dating from the eighteenth century.
- An eighteenth-century chateau, built on the ruins of an earlier castle.

== See also ==
- Communes of the Seine-Maritime department
