= Saussay, Seine-Maritime =

Saussay
- Commune
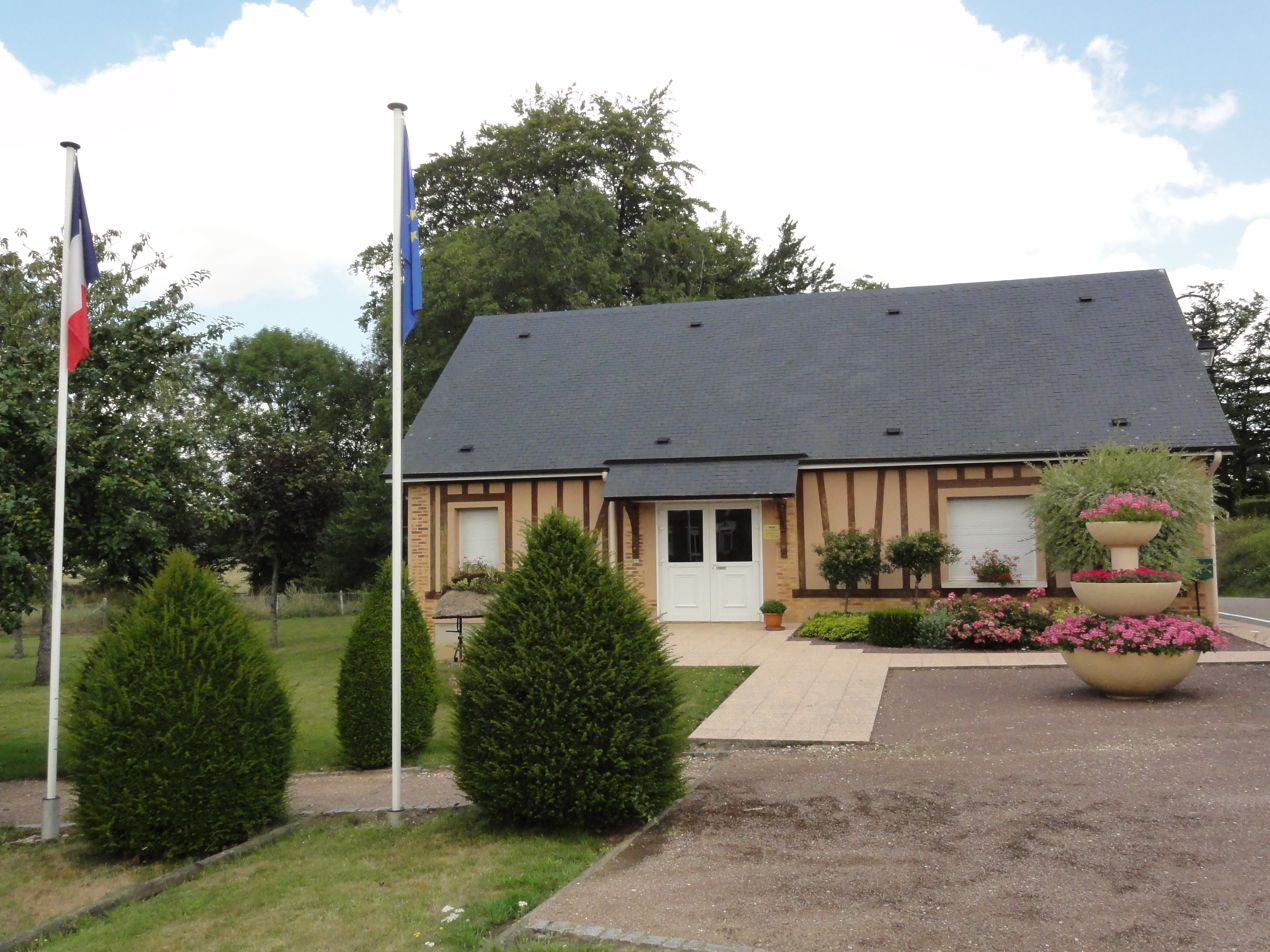
- Saussay Town hall

- Coat of arms
- Location of Saussay
- Location within France Location within Normandy
- Coordinates: 49°38′08″N 0°56′25″E
- Country: France
- Region: Normandy
- Department: Seine-Maritime
- Arrondissement: Rouen
- Canton: Yvetot
- Intercommunality: CC Plateau de Caux

Government
  - Mayor (2026–32): Rémy Bonamy
- Area^{1}: 5.17 km^{2} (2.00 sq mi)
- Elevation: 160 m (520 ft)
- Highest elevation: 177 m (581 ft)
- Lowest elevation: 150 m (490 ft)
- Population (2023): 376
  - Density: 72.7/km^{2} (188/sq mi)
- Time zone: UTC+01:00 (CET)
  - Summer (DST): UTC+02:00 (CEST)
- INSEE/Postal code: 76668 /76760
- ^{1} French Land Register data, which excludes lakes, ponds, glaciers > 1 km^{2} (0.386 sq mi or 247 acres) and river estuaries.

Saussay (French pronunciation: [sosɛ]) is a commune in the Seine-Maritime department in the Normandy region in northern France.

== Geography ==
A farming village situated in the Pays de Caux, some 20 miles (32 km) north of Rouen at the junction of the D124, D142 and the D324 roads.

== Population ==
Historical population
Year	Pop.	±% p.a.
1968	224	—
1975	168	−4.03%
1982	214	+3.52%
1990	270	+2.95%
1999	307	+1.44%
2007	320	+0.52%
2012	343	+1.40%
2017	376	+1.85%
2023	376	+0.00%
Source: INSEE

== Places of interest ==
- The church of St. Martin, dating from the seventeenth century.
- The chateau of Vermanoir.

== See also ==
- Communes of the Seine-Maritime department
