= Yerville =

- Commune
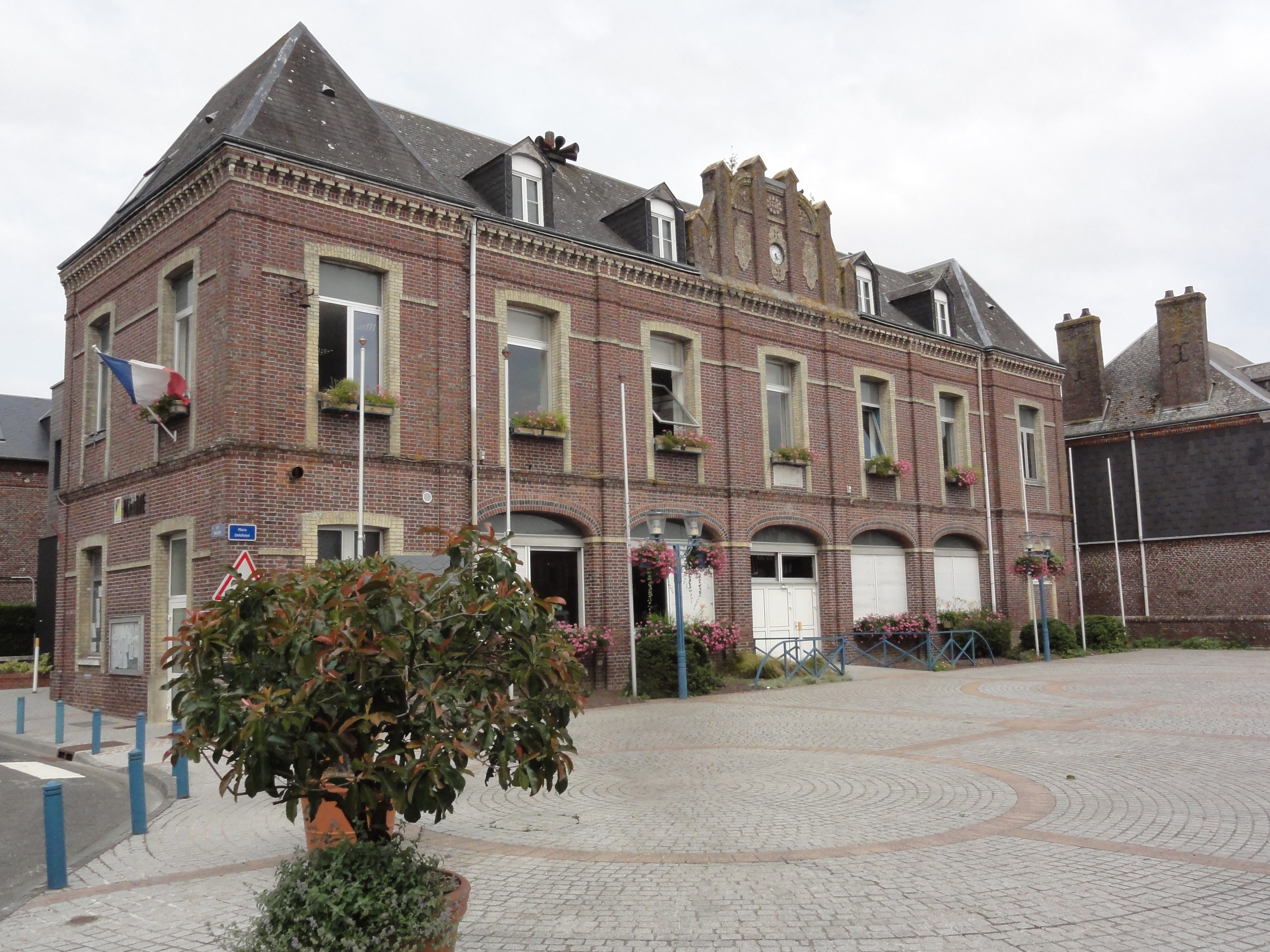
- Town hall

- Coat of arms
- Location of Yerville
- Location within France Location within Normandy
- Coordinates: 49°40′08″N 0°53′49″E
- Country: France
- Region: Normandy
- Department: Seine-Maritime
- Arrondissement: Rouen
- Canton: Yvetot
- Intercommunality: CC Plateau de Caux

Government
  - Mayor (2020–2026): Thierry Louvel
- Area^{1}: 10.42 km^{2} (4.02 sq mi)
- Elevation: 56 m (184 ft)
- Highest elevation: 174 m (571 ft)
- Lowest elevation: 148 m (486 ft)
- Population (2023): 2,731
  - Density: 262.1/km^{2} (678.8/sq mi)
- Time zone: UTC+01:00 (CET)
  - Summer (DST): UTC+02:00 (CEST)
- INSEE/Postal code: 76752 /76760
- ^{1} French Land Register data, which excludes lakes, ponds, glaciers > 1 km^{2} (0.386 sq mi or 247 acres) and river estuaries.

Yerville (French pronunciation: [jɛʁvil]) is a commune in the Seine-Maritime department in the Normandy region in northern France.

== Geography ==
A small farming and light industrial town situated in the Pays de Caux, some 20 miles (32 km) northwest of Rouen at the junction of the D929 with the D142 road. The A29 autoroute forms the southern border of the commune's territory.

== Heraldry ==
Arms of Yerville	The arms of Yerville are blazoned : Azure, a pall Or, on a chief gules a leopard Or.

== Population ==
Historical population
Year	Pop.	±% p.a.
1968	1,381	—
1975	1,492	+1.11%
1982	1,847	+3.10%
1990	1,948	+0.67%
1999	2,170	+1.21%
2007	2,274	+0.59%
2012	2,414	+1.20%
2017	2,418	+0.03%
2023	2,731	+2.05%
Source: INSEE

== Places of interest ==
- The church of Notre-Dame, dating from the nineteenth century.
- Ruins of the sixteenth-century chateau of Thibermesnil.

== See also ==
- Communes of the Seine-Maritime department
