= Baons-le-Comte =

- Commune
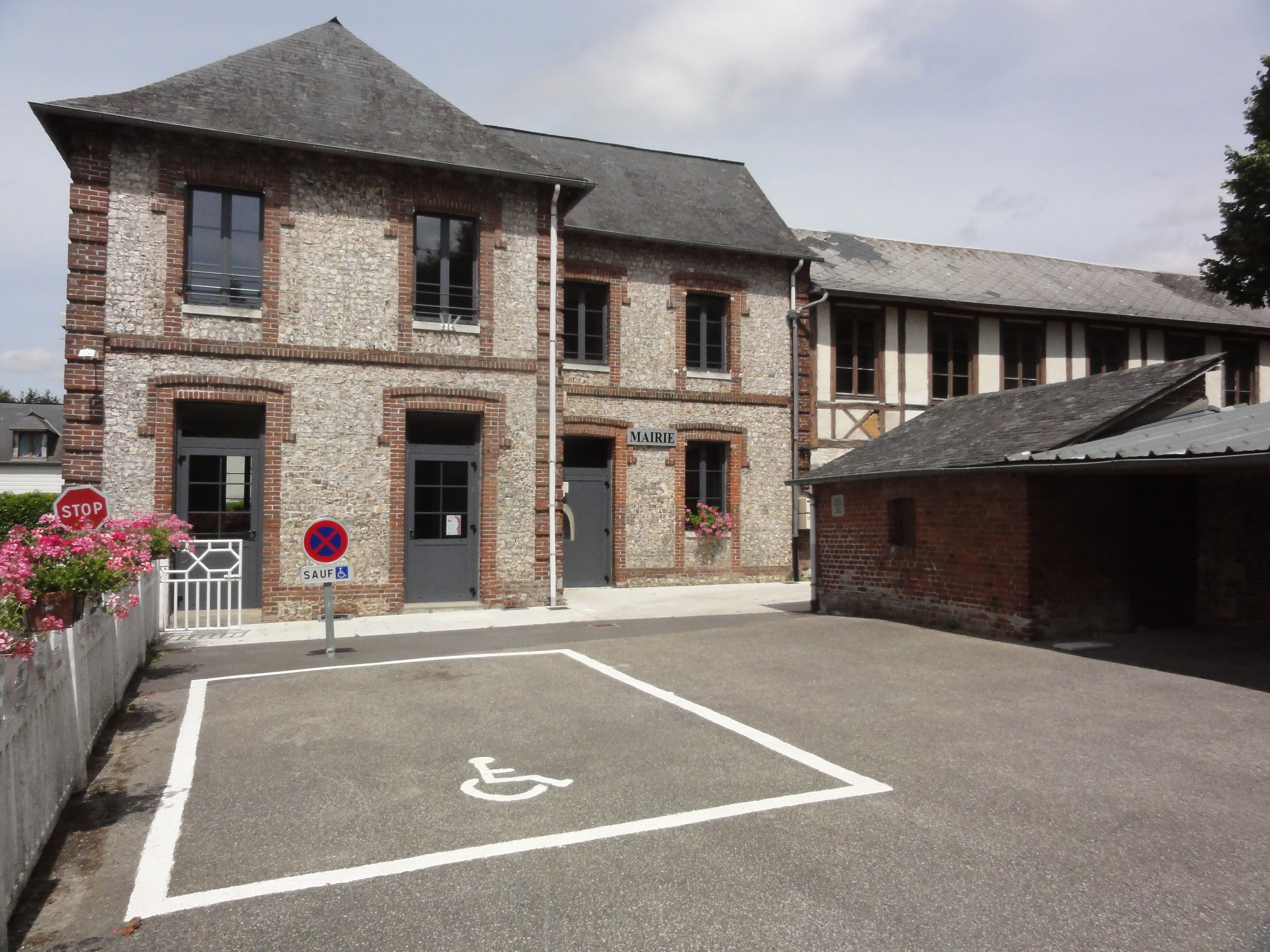
- Town hall

- Coat of arms
- Location of Baons-le-Comte
- Location within France Location within Normandy
- Coordinates: 49°38′33″N 0°46′39″E
- Country: France
- Region: Normandy
- Department: Seine-Maritime
- Arrondissement: Rouen
- Canton: Yvetot

Government
  - Mayor (2026–32): Catherine Maillot
- Area^{1}: 5.38 km^{2} (2.08 sq mi)
- Elevation: 170 m (560 ft)
- Highest elevation: 154 m (505 ft)
- Lowest elevation: 131 m (430 ft)
- Population (2023): 337
  - Density: 62.6/km^{2} (162/sq mi)
- Time zone: UTC+01:00 (CET)
  - Summer (DST): UTC+02:00 (CEST)
- INSEE/Postal code: 76055 /76190
- ^{1} French Land Register data, which excludes lakes, ponds, glaciers > 1 km^{2} (0.386 sq mi or 247 acres) and river estuaries.

Baons-le-Comte (French pronunciation: [bɑ̃ lə kɔ̃t]) is a commune in the Seine-Maritime department in the Normandy region in northern France.

== Geography ==
A farming village situated in the Pays de Caux, some 22 miles (35 km) northwest of Rouen at the junction of the D240, D37 and the D55 roads. The A29 autoroute joins with the A150 autoroute within the commune's territory.

=== Heraldry ===
Arms of Baons-le-Comte	The arms of Baons-le-Comte are blazoned : Per pale azure and vert, a balance argent and a (weaver's) shuttle bendwise sinister Or, and on a base gules fimbriated Or a jeweled county coronet proper.

== Population ==
Historical population
Year	Pop.	±% p.a.
1968	247	—
1975	289	+2.27%
1982	303	+0.68%
1990	340	+1.45%
1999	359	+0.61%
2007	337	−0.79%
2012	359	+1.27%
2017	349	−0.56%
2023	337	−0.58%
Source: INSEE

== Places of interest ==
- The chateau, dating from the nineteenth century.
- The church of St.Romain, dating from the twelfth century.

== See also ==
- Communes of the Seine-Maritime department
