= Canton of Yvetot =

Coordinates: 49°36′59″N 0°44′05″E

Yvetot
- Canton
- Country: France
- Region: Normandy
- Department: Seine-Maritime
- No. of communes: {{{nbcomm}}}
- Area: 360.36 km^{2} (139.14 sq mi)
- Population (2023): 43,079
  - Density: 119.54/km^{2} (309.62/sq mi)
- INSEE code: 76 35

The Canton of Yvetot is a canton situated in the Seine-Maritime département and in the Normandy region of northern France.

== Geography ==
An area of farming and associated light industry situated some 22 miles (35 km) northwest of Rouen.

== Composition ==
At the French canton reorganisation which came into effect in March 2015, the canton was expanded from 12 to 53 communes:

- Allouville-Bellefosse
- Amfreville-les-Champs
- Ancretiéville-Saint-Victor
- Anvéville
- Auzebosc
- Auzouville-l'Esneval
- Baons-le-Comte
- Bénesville
- Berville-en-Caux
- Bois-Himont
- Boudeville
- Bourdainville
- Bretteville-Saint-Laurent
- Butot
- Canville-les-Deux-Églises
- Carville-Pot-de-Fer
- Cideville
- Criquetot-sur-Ouville
- Doudeville
- Écretteville-lès-Baons
- Ectot-l'Auber
- Ectot-lès-Baons
- Étalleville
- Étoutteville
- Flamanville
- Fultot
- Gonzeville
- Grémonville
- Harcanville
- Hautot-le-Vatois
- Hautot-Saint-Sulpice
- Les Hauts-de-Caux
- Héricourt-en-Caux
- Hugleville-en-Caux
- Lindebeuf
- Motteville
- Ouville-l'Abbaye
- Prétot-Vicquemare
- Reuville
- Robertot
- Routes
- Saint-Clair-sur-les-Monts
- Sainte-Marie-des-Champs
- Saint-Laurent-en-Caux
- Saint-Martin-aux-Arbres
- Saussay
- Le Torp-Mesnil
- Touffreville-la-Corbeline
- Valliquerville
- Yvetot
- Vibeuf
- Yerville
- Yvecrique

== Population ==
Historical population
Year	Pop.	±% p.a.
2013	42,670	—
2018	42,947	+0.13%
Source: INSEE

== See also ==
- Arrondissements of the Seine-Maritime department
- Cantons of the Seine-Maritime department
- Communes of the Seine-Maritime department
