= Robertot =

- Commune
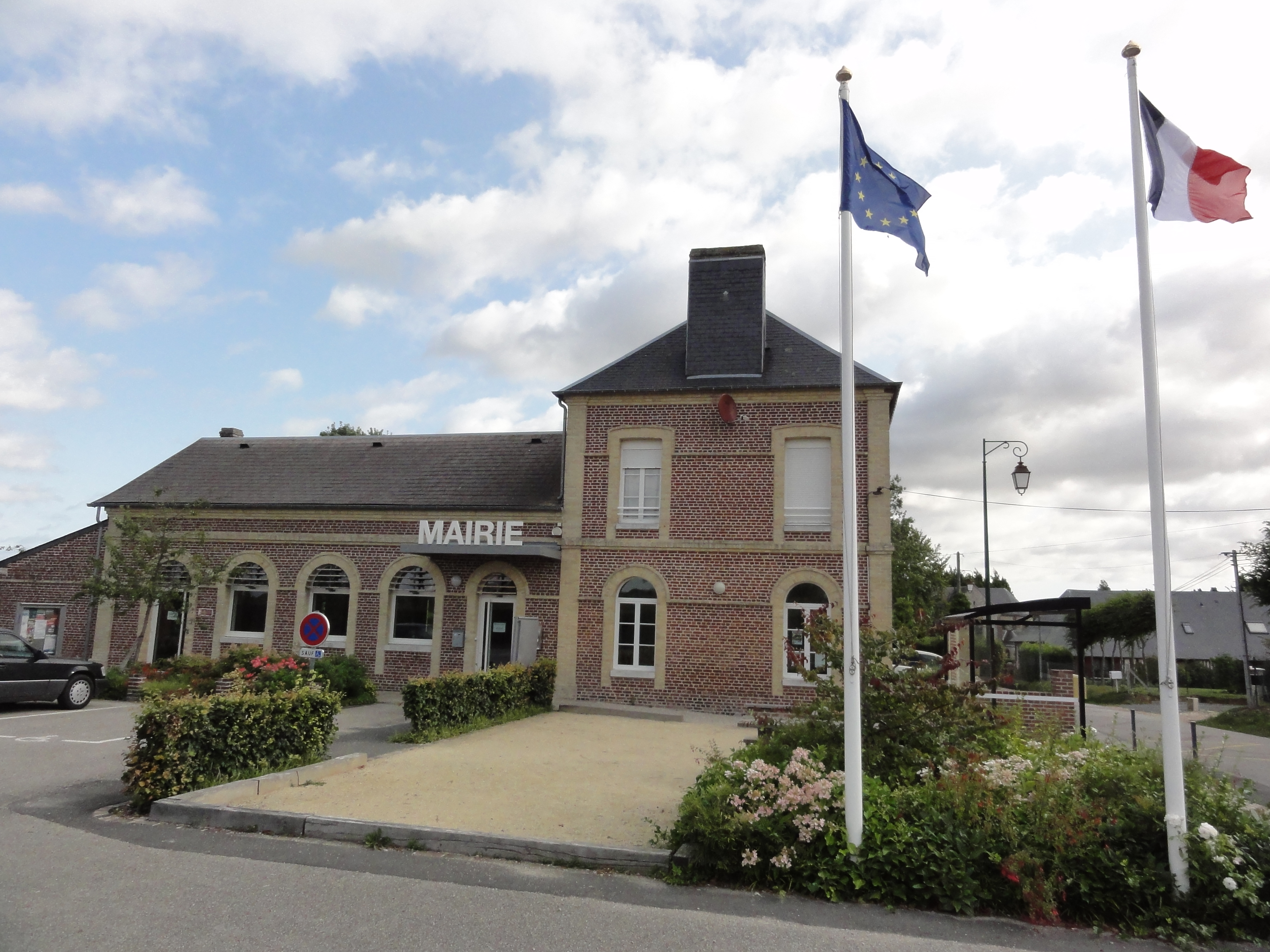
- Town hall
- Location of Robertot
- Location within France Location within Normandy
- Coordinates: 49°43′11″N 0°41′52″E
- Country: France
- Region: Normandy
- Department: Seine-Maritime
- Arrondissement: Rouen
- Canton: Yvetot
- Intercommunality: CC Plateau de Caux
- Area^{1}: 2.45 km^{2} (0.95 sq mi)
- Elevation: 112 m (367 ft)
- Highest elevation: 126 m (413 ft)
- Lowest elevation: 50 m (160 ft)
- Population (2023): 213
  - Density: 86.9/km^{2} (225/sq mi)
- Time zone: UTC+01:00 (CET)
  - Summer (DST): UTC+02:00 (CEST)
- INSEE/Postal code: 76530 /76560
- ^{1} French Land Register data, which excludes lakes, ponds, glaciers > 1 km^{2} (0.386 sq mi or 247 acres) and river estuaries.

Robertot (French pronunciation: [ʁɔbɛʁto]) is a commune in the Seine-Maritime department of the Normandy region in northern France.

== Geography ==
A farming village by the wooded banks of the river Durdent, in the Pays de Caux, approximately 31 miles (50 km) northeast of Le Havre, at the junction of the D53 and D106 roads.

== Population ==
Historical population
Year	Pop.	±% p.a.
1968	169	—
1975	121	−4.66%
1982	132	+1.25%
1990	129	−0.29%
1999	117	−1.08%
2007	186	+5.97%
2012	199	+1.36%
2017	215	+1.56%
2023	213	−0.16%
Source: INSEE

== Places of interest ==
- The church of St.Pierre, dating from the eighteenth century.

== See also ==
- Communes of the Seine-Maritime department
