= Clasville =

- Commune
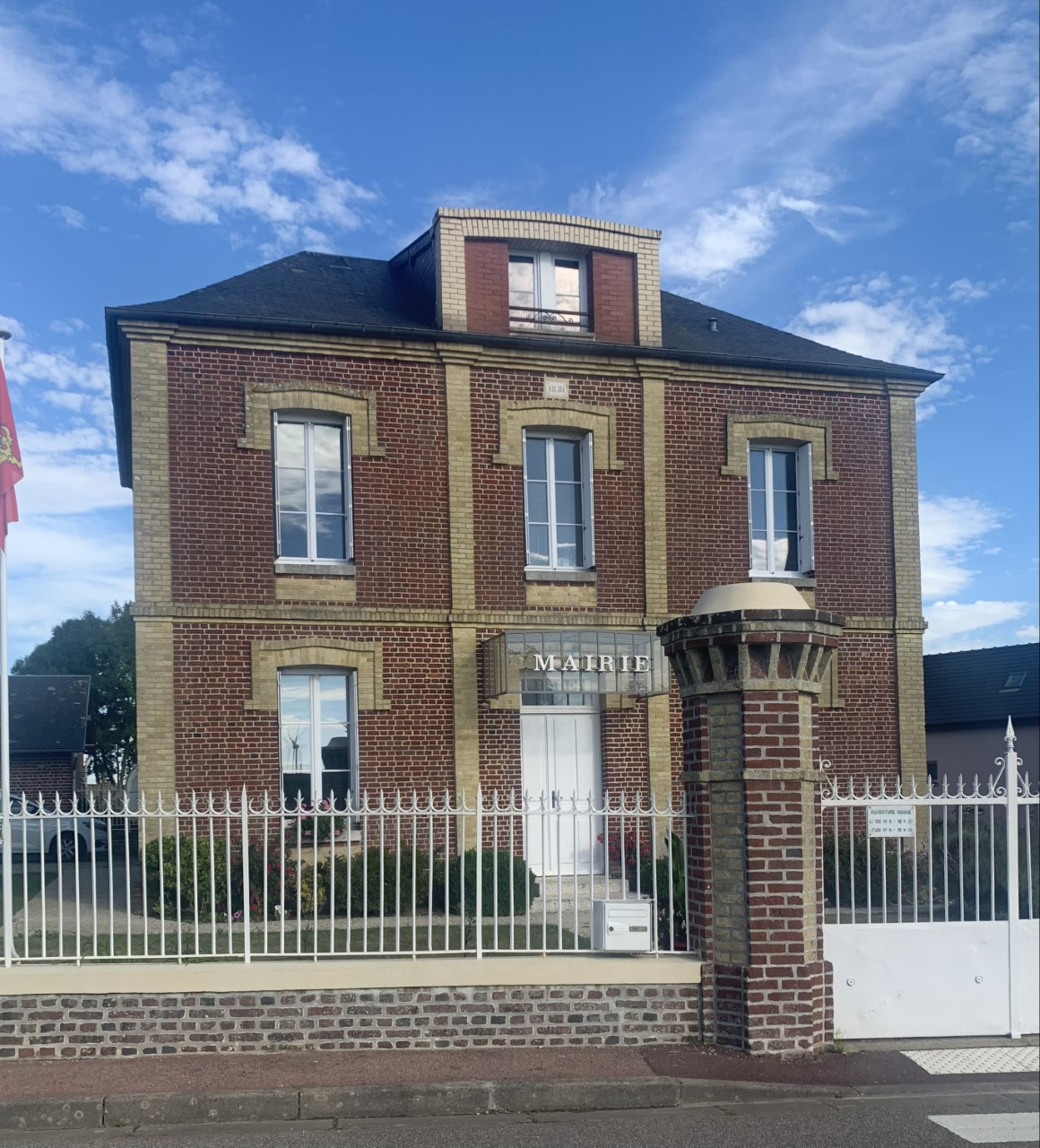

- Coat of arms
- Location of Clasville
- Location within France Location within Normandy
- Coordinates: 49°47′29″N 0°37′10″E
- Country: France
- Region: Normandy
- Department: Seine-Maritime
- Arrondissement: Dieppe
- Canton: Saint-Valery-en-Caux
- Intercommunality: CC Côte d'Albâtre

Government
  - Mayor (2026–32): Pascal Baillet
- Area^{1}: 3.16 km^{2} (1.22 sq mi)
- Elevation: 108 m (354 ft)
- Highest elevation: 112 m (367 ft)
- Lowest elevation: 10 m (33 ft)
- Population (2023): 347
  - Density: 110/km^{2} (284/sq mi)
- Time zone: UTC+01:00 (CET)
  - Summer (DST): UTC+02:00 (CEST)
- INSEE/Postal code: 76176 /76450
- ^{1} French Land Register data, which excludes lakes, ponds, glaciers > 1 km^{2} (0.386 sq mi or 247 acres) and river estuaries.

Clasville is a commune in the Seine-Maritime department in the Normandy region in northern France.

== Geography ==
A farming village situated by the banks of the river Durdent in the Pays de Caux, some 28 miles (45 km) southeast of Dieppe, near the junction of the D925 and the D271 roads.

== Population ==
Historical population
Year	Pop.	±% p.a.
1968	223	—
1975	181	−2.94%
1982	236	+3.86%
1990	215	−1.16%
1999	222	+0.36%
2007	255	+1.75%
2012	290	+2.61%
2017	326	+2.37%
2023	347	+1.05%
Source: INSEE

== Places of interest ==
- The church of St. Honorine, dating from the sixteenth century.

== See also ==
- Communes of the Seine-Maritime department
