= Sommesnil =

- Commune
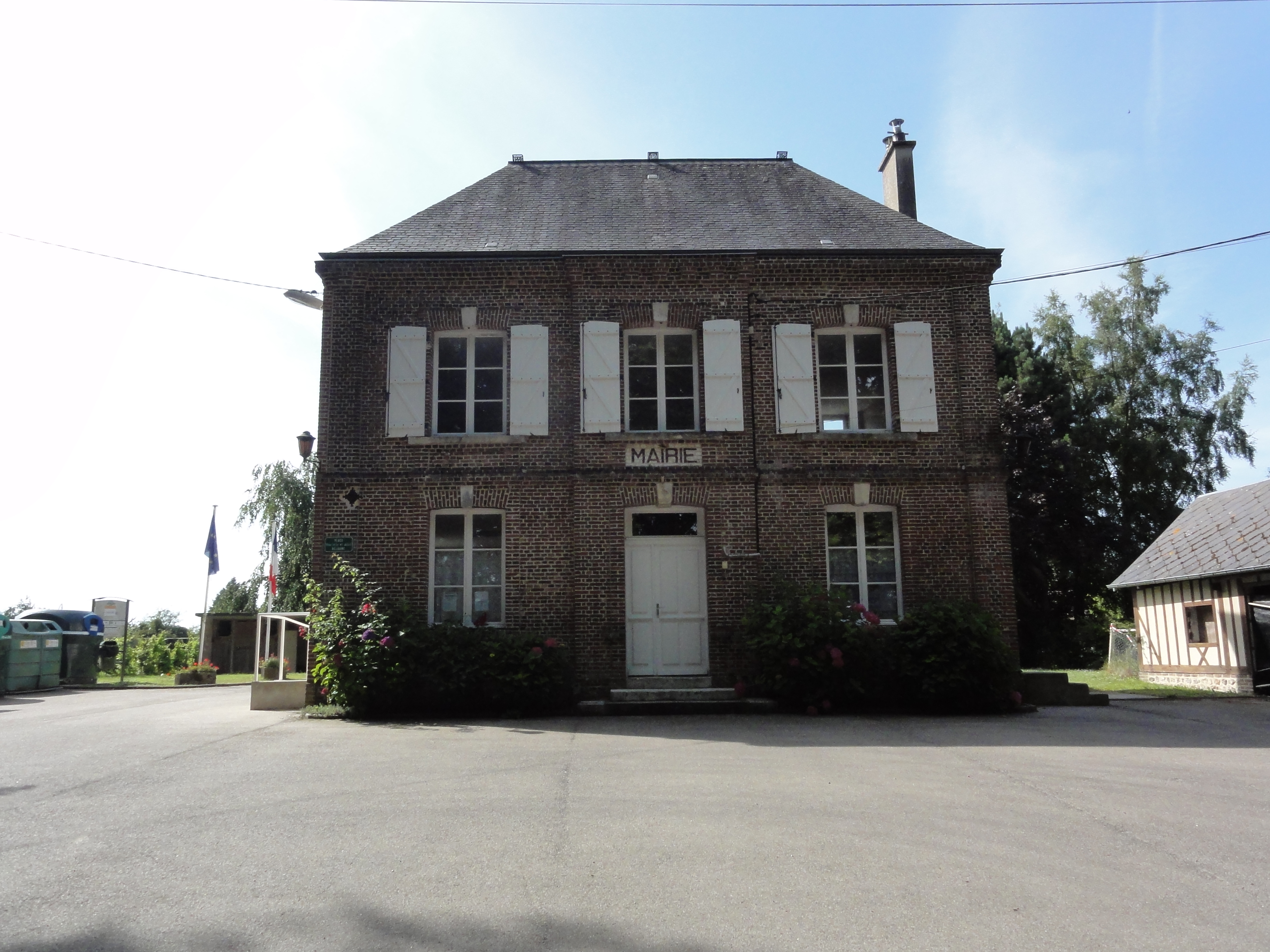
- Town hall
- Location of Sommesnil
- Location within France Location within Normandy
- Coordinates: 49°42′43″N 0°40′25″E
- Country: France
- Region: Normandy
- Department: Seine-Maritime
- Arrondissement: Dieppe
- Canton: Saint-Valery-en-Caux
- Intercommunality: CC Côte d'Albâtre

Government
  - Mayor (2026–32): Antoine Lecroq
- Area^{1}: 3.06 km^{2} (1.18 sq mi)
- Elevation: 121 m (397 ft)
- Highest elevation: 128 m (420 ft)
- Lowest elevation: 47 m (154 ft)
- Population (2023): 110
  - Density: 36/km^{2} (93/sq mi)
- Time zone: UTC+01:00 (CET)
  - Summer (DST): UTC+02:00 (CEST)
- INSEE/Postal code: 76679 /76560
- ^{1} French Land Register data, which excludes lakes, ponds, glaciers > 1 km^{2} (0.386 sq mi or 247 acres) and river estuaries.

Sommesnil (French pronunciation: [sɔmenil]) is a commune in the Seine-Maritime department in the Normandy region in northern France.

== Geography ==
A very small farming village, in the Durdent valley of the Pays de Caux, situated some 32 miles (51 km) northeast of Le Havre, at the junction of the D105 and D106 roads.

== Population ==
Historical population
Year	Pop.	±% p.a.
1968	80	—
1975	64	−3.14%
1982	62	−0.45%
1990	66	+0.78%
1999	84	+2.72%
2007	86	+0.29%
2012	94	+1.79%
2017	103	+1.85%
2023	110	+1.10%
Source: INSEE

== Places of interest ==
- The church of St. Firmin, dating from the nineteenth century.
- A seventeenth-century chateau. The chateau was built in 1620 by Louis XIII on the site of a medieval chateau as a base for hunting. Louis XIII built the two fine Medici gates which still exist in honour of his mother Marie de Medici [1575-1642]. She was the wife of Henry IV and Queen of France. The Chateau was later Inhabited by the family Bigot who were involved in the parliament at Rouen. Over the years it has been a home, a medical centre and used by the German and United States armies in WW2. It has original ceilings and panelled dining room, an original kitchen with fireplace, an impressive staircase and cour d'honneur with fine tapestries. The chateau has been undergoing a full restoration by the current owner.
- The chapel of Notre-Dame. This is a small Chapel much revered by the community of Sommesnil who hold an annual service and procession between the chapel and the church of St Firmin. The chapel was originally owned by the château of Sommesnil but was donated by the present owner of the chateau to the community of Sommesnil.

== See also ==
- Communes of the Seine-Maritime department
