= Vittefleur =

- Commune
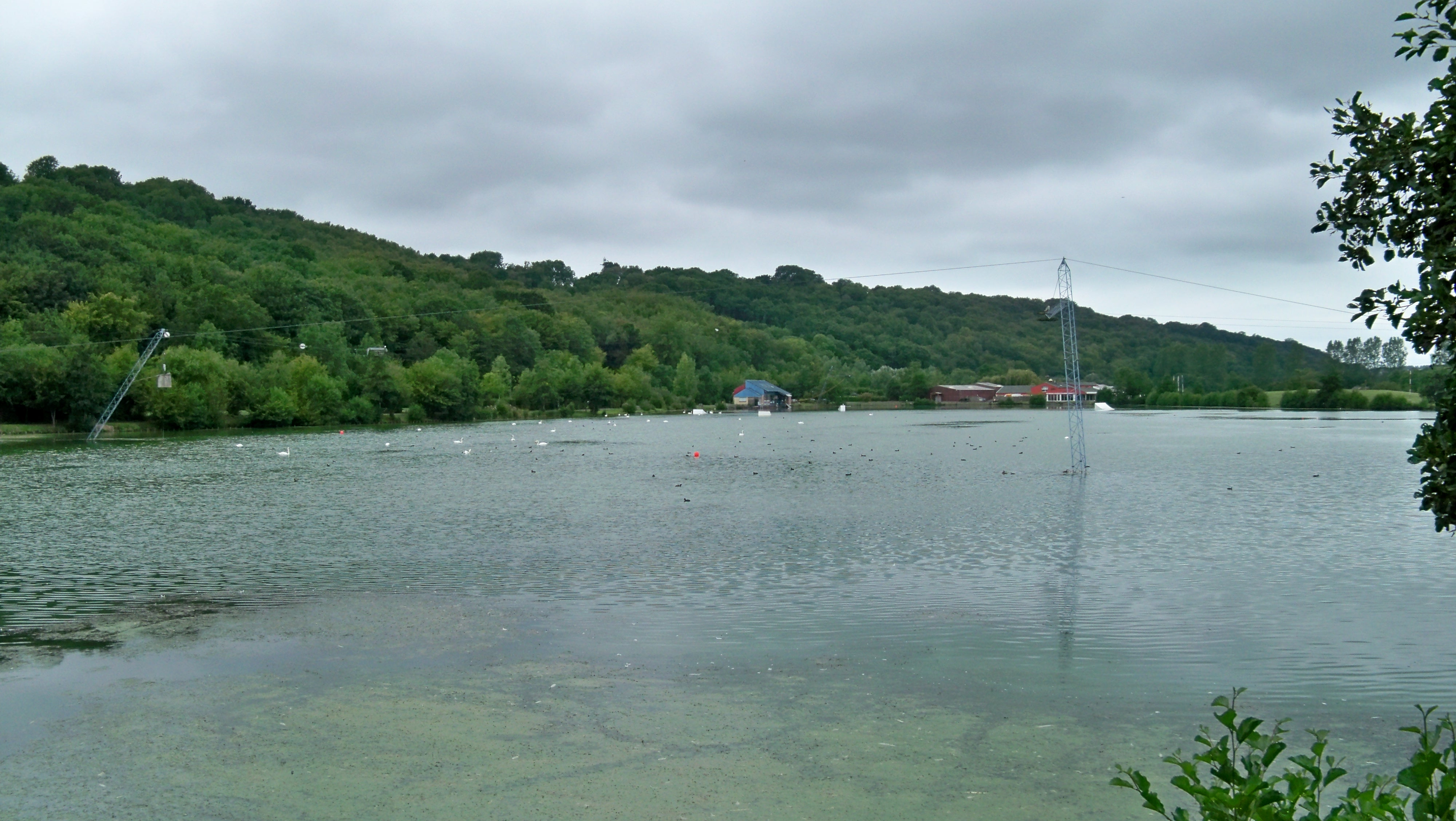
- Caniel Lake
- Location of Vittefleur
- Location within France Location within Normandy
- Coordinates: 49°49′10″N 0°38′18″E
- Country: France
- Region: Normandy
- Department: Seine-Maritime
- Arrondissement: Dieppe
- Canton: Saint-Valery-en-Caux
- Intercommunality: Côte d'Albâtre

Government
  - Mayor (2026–32): Franck Foiret
- Area^{1}: 8.17 km^{2} (3.15 sq mi)
- Elevation: 8 m (26 ft)
- Highest elevation: 100 m (330 ft)
- Lowest elevation: 2 m (6.6 ft)
- Population (2023): 642
  - Density: 78.6/km^{2} (204/sq mi)
- Time zone: UTC+01:00 (CET)
  - Summer (DST): UTC+02:00 (CEST)
- INSEE/Postal code: 76748 /76450
- ^{1} French Land Register data, which excludes lakes, ponds, glaciers > 1 km^{2} (0.386 sq mi or 247 acres) and river estuaries.

Vittefleur is a commune in the Seine-Maritime department in the Normandy region in northern France.

== Geography ==
A farming village situated on the banks of the river Durdent in the Pays de Caux, some 23 miles (37 km) southwest of Dieppe at the junction of the D69, D10 and the D268 roads.

== Population ==
Historical population
Year	Pop.	±% p.a.
1968	651	—
1975	638	−0.29%
1982	736	+2.06%
1990	678	−1.02%
1999	641	−0.62%
2007	627	−0.28%
2012	629	+0.06%
2017	655	+0.81%
2023	642	−0.33%
Source: INSEE

== Places of interest ==
- The church of St. Pierre and Paul, dating from the thirteenth century.
- The ruins of a sixteenth-century castle.
- A stone cross from the sixteenth century.
- The eighteenth-century chapel of Saint-Pierre at Crosville.

== See also ==
- Communes of the Seine-Maritime department
