= Durdent (river) =

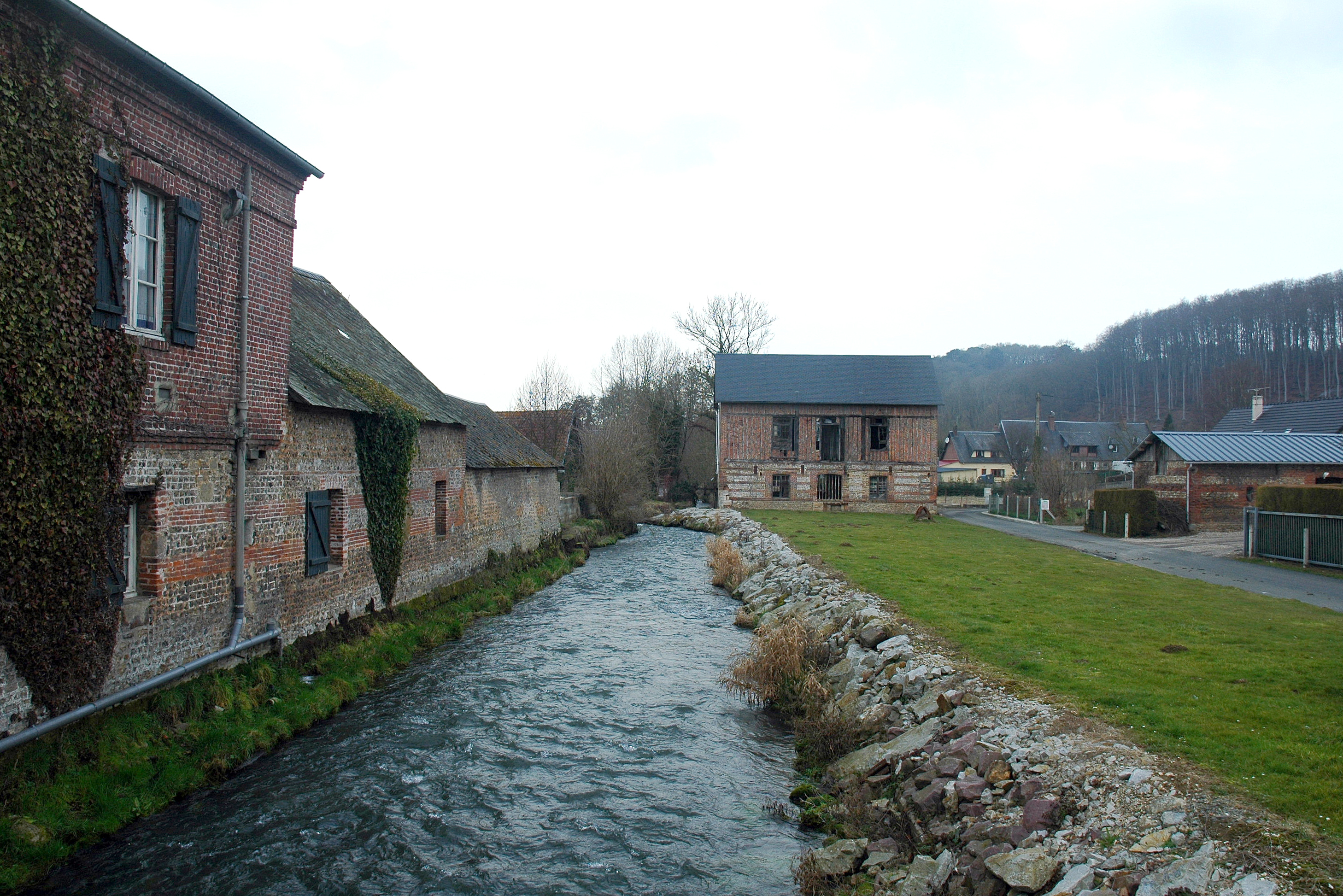

Location
- Country: France

Physical characteristics
- Source
  - location: Pays de Caux
- Mouth
  - location: English Channel
  - coordinates: 49.8563°N 0.6069°E
- Length: 25.4 km (15.8 mi)

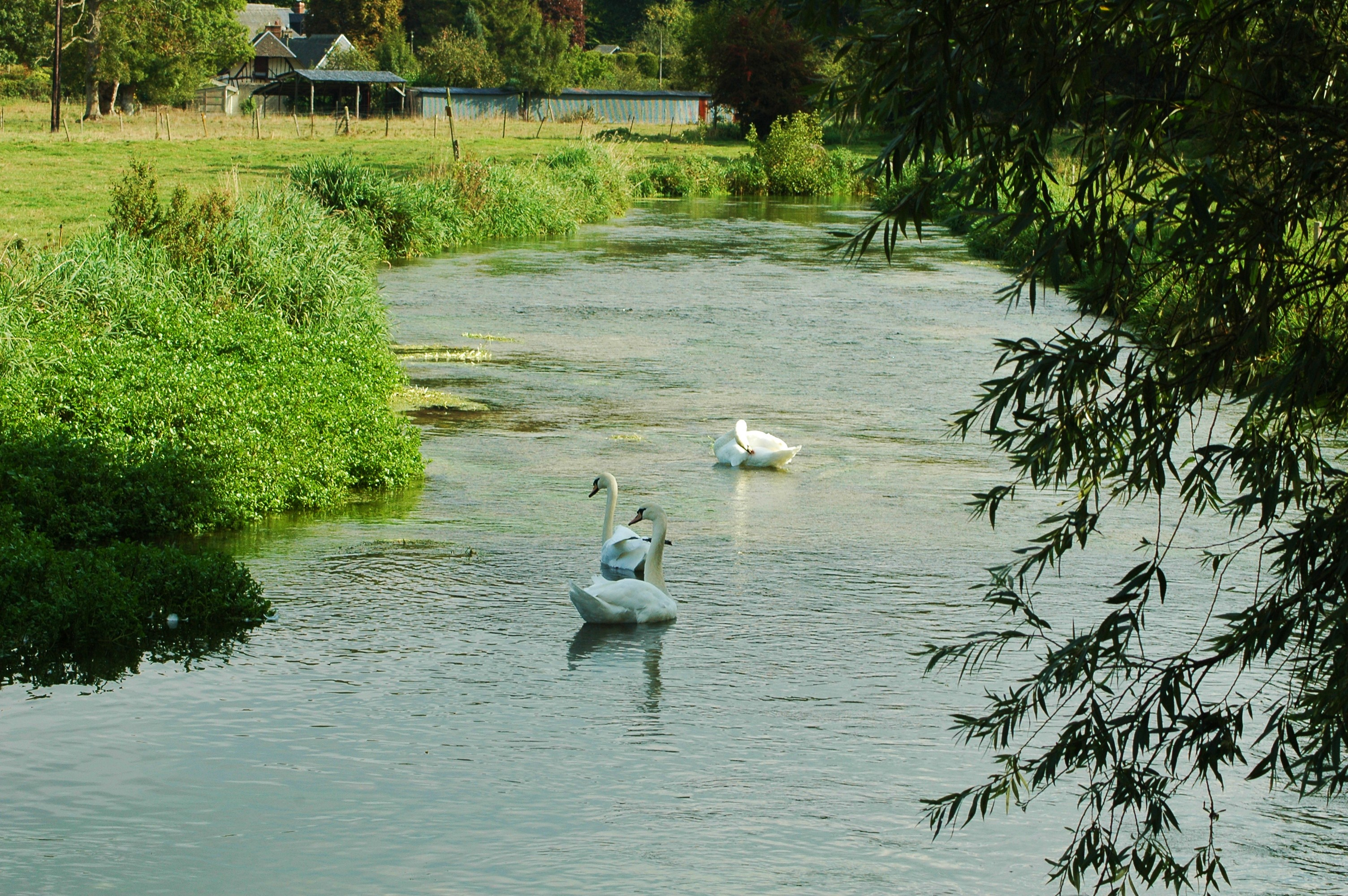
The River Durdent

Hydrological table of the Durdent at Vittefleur

The river Durdent (French pronunciation: [dyʁdɑ̃]) is one of the many small coastal rivers that flow from the plateau of the Pays de Caux into the English Channel. It is 25.4 km (15.8 mi) long.

== Course ==
The river rises just northwest of Yvetot, near Héricourt-en-Caux, at the meeting of the two streams, the Saint-Denis and the Saint-Riquier, then takes a north-northwest route, typical of the rivers of the Seine-Maritime department. It passes through the villages of Robertot, Sommesnil, Oherville, Le Hanouard, Clasville, Grainville-la-Teinturière, Cany-Barville, Vittefleur and Paluel and empties into the English Channel at Veulettes-sur-Mer. In earlier times, it powered many watermills along its course.

== Flora and fauna ==
The Durdent valley is home to many bats such as the rare vespers bat, the large and lesser horseshoe bat and the mouse-eared bats. More common species, such as the long-eared bat and Daubenton's Bat are present in large numbers. Kniphofia (red-hot pokers) grow in a few places along the river's course.

== See also ==
Schéma directeur d'aménagement et de gestion des eaux
