= Paluel =

- Commune
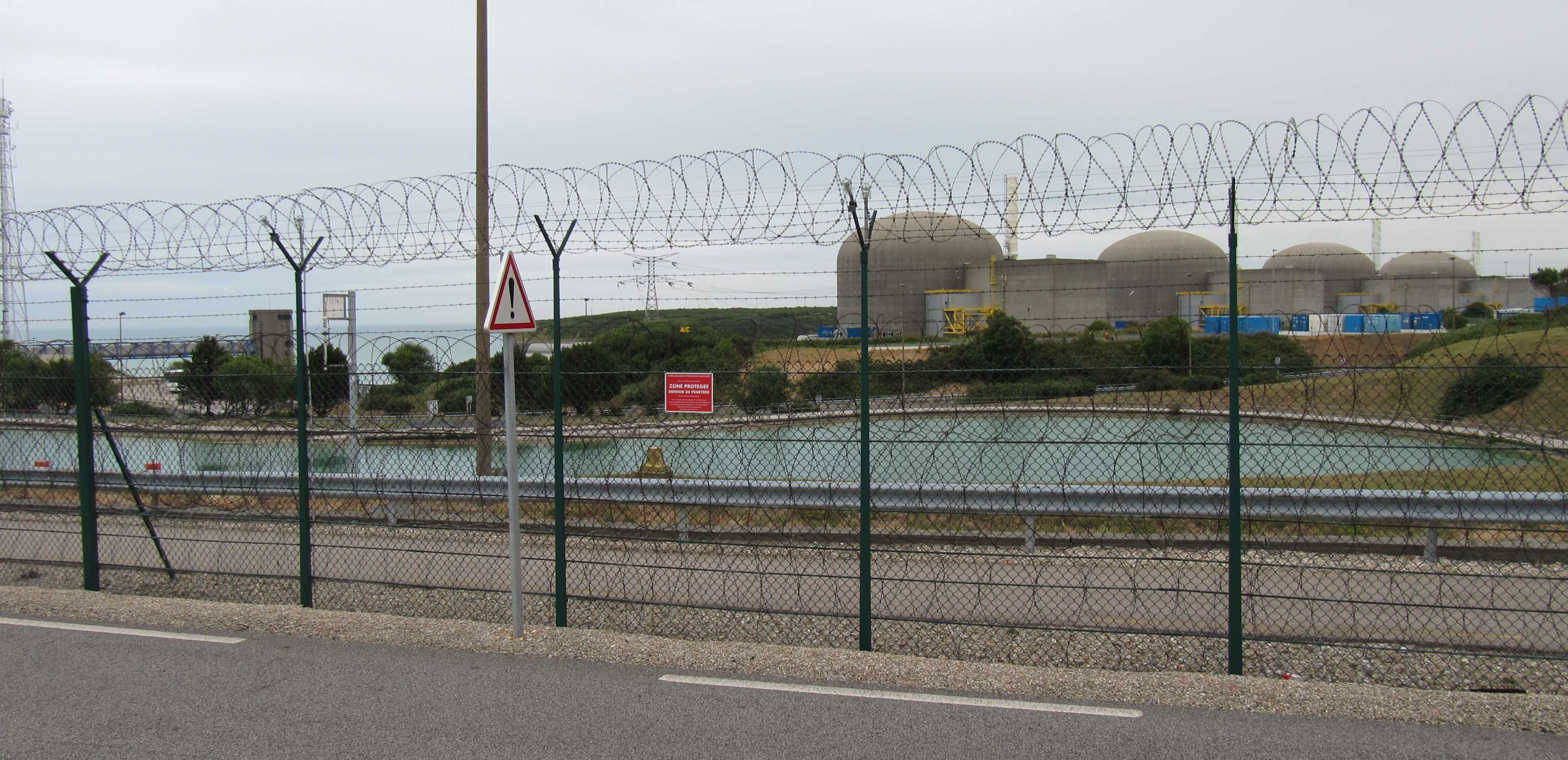
- Paluel Nuclear Power Plant

- Coat of arms
- Location of Paluel
- Location within France Location within Normandy
- Coordinates: 49°50′01″N 0°37′44″E
- Country: France
- Region: Normandy
- Department: Seine-Maritime
- Arrondissement: Dieppe
- Canton: Saint-Valery-en-Caux
- Intercommunality: CC Côte d'Albâtre

Government
  - Mayor (2026–32): Didier Gaston
- Area^{1}: 10.87 km^{2} (4.20 sq mi)
- Elevation: 9 m (30 ft)
- Highest elevation: 96 m (315 ft)
- Lowest elevation: 0 m (0 ft)
- Population (2023): 406
  - Density: 37.4/km^{2} (96.7/sq mi)
- Time zone: UTC+01:00 (CET)
  - Summer (DST): UTC+02:00 (CEST)
- INSEE/Postal code: 76493 /76450
- ^{1} French Land Register data, which excludes lakes, ponds, glaciers > 1 km^{2} (0.386 sq mi or 247 acres) and river estuaries.

Paluel (French pronunciation: [palɥɛl]) is a commune in the Seine-Maritime department in the Normandy region in northern France.

== Geography ==
A village of farming and light industry situated by the banks of the river Durdent in the Pays de Caux at the junction of the D10, D68 and the D79 roads, some 20 miles (32 km) southwest of Dieppe.

== History ==
The village owes its name to the marshes (in Latin "Palus"), in the lower valley of the Durdent.
A Roman mosaic was excavated in 1849 at a place known as the Rosy.
A church has existed here from 988, under the jurisdiction of the abbey at Fécamp.
The manor of Janville was given to the seigneurs of Paluel by Henri III in 1582.
There was a leper colony here until 1695.
The commune had 638 inhabitants in 1876.
The United States "Lucky Strike" army camp counted 300,000 inhabitants after the offensive against Germany during 1944/45.
In 1977, EDF, the French electricity company, built a nuclear power station, with 4 reactors of 1300MW each. It covers 200 hectares (490 acres) of land within the commune.

== Population ==
Historical population
Year	Pop.	±% p.a.
1968	389	—
1975	364	−0.94%
1982	443	+2.85%
1990	383	−1.80%
1999	416	+0.92%
2007	454	+1.10%
2012	457	+0.13%
2017	432	−1.12%
2023	406	−1.03%
Source: INSEE

== Places of interest ==
- The nuclear power station on the coast at Conteville.
- The seventeenth-century château de Janville, with its dovecote and park.
- The two 18th-century châteaux at Bertheauville and Conteville
- The chapel of Notre-Dame at Janville, dating from the thirteenth century.
- The church of St. Pierre, dating from the twelfth century.
- The church of St. Martin, dating from the thirteenth century.
- A sixteenth-century stone cross.

== See also ==
- Paluel Nuclear Power Plant
- Communes of the Seine-Maritime department
