= Paluel Nuclear Power Plant =

Nuclear power plant in Normandy, France

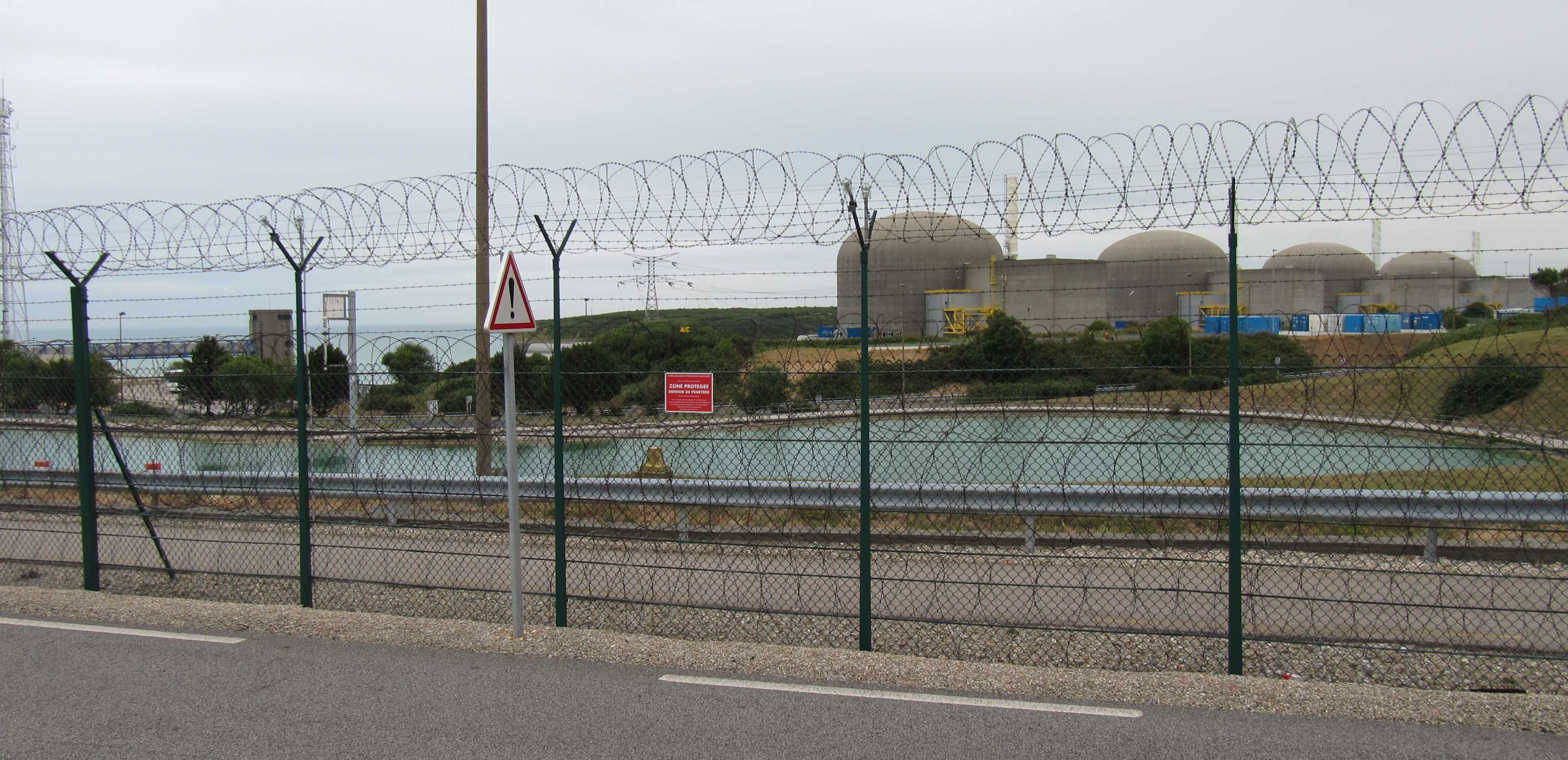
- Official name: Centrale Nucléaire de Paluel
- Country: France
- Location: Paluel, Seine-Maritime, Normandy
- Coordinates: 49°51′29″N 0°38′8″E
- Status: Operational
- Construction began: Unit 1: 15 August 1977; Unit 2: 1 January 1978; Unit 3: 1 February 1979; Unit 4: 1 February 1980
- Commission date: Units 1–2: 1 December 1985; Unit 3: 1 February 1986; Unit 4: 1 June 1986
- Owner: EDF
- Operator: EDF

Nuclear power station
- Reactor type: PWR
- Reactor supplier: Framatome
- Cooling source: English Channel
- Thermal capacity: 4 × 3817 MW_{th}

Power generation
- Units operational: 4 × 1330 MW
- Make and model: P4 REP 1300
- Nameplate capacity: 5320 MW
- Capacity factor: 68.53% (lifetime)
- Annual net output: 21,218 GWh (2017)

External links
- Website: Centrale nucléaire de Paluel
- Commons: Related media on Commons

The Paluel Nuclear Power Plant (French: Centrale nucléaire de Paluel) lies within the French town Paluel in Normandy in the Département Seine-Maritime. The nuclear power plant, which consists of four 1330 MWe class pressurized water reactors, is about 40 kilometers far away from the city of Dieppe and employs approx. 1,250 full-time workers. The operator is the French company EDF. Water from the English Channel is used for cooling.

== Achievement ==
The installed total output of 5.528 GW makes it one of the largest nuclear power stations in France. By electrical output it is second place in France and seventh place worldwide. It feeds on average 32 billion kilowatt-hours into the public electricity grid every year.

== Safety ==
In the past, there were problems with the cooling of the plant due to blockage of cooling water from the English Channel, which caused an automatic reactor trip. The blockage was caused in part by seasonally-present macroalgae, and EDF is pursuing possible solutions to prevent its recurrence with Gunderboom, Inc.

In April 2016 a 450-tonne steam generator crashed onto the reactor floor during the decennial maintenance outage of Paluel 2. Paluel 2 had gone offline in May 2015, and the incident delayed its restart until July 2018 after replacement of the steam generator and full testing of concrete damages.

== Reactors ==
Reaktorblock	Type	Net power	Total power	Construction start	Construction finish	Commercial operation	Licensed Until
Paluel 1	PWR	1,330 MW	1,382 MW	15.08.1977	22.06.1984	01.12.1985	2025
Paluel 2	PWR	1,330 MW	1,382 MW	01.01.1978	04.09.1984	01.12.1985	2025
Paluel 3	PWR	1,330 MW	1,382 MW	01.02.1979	30.09.1985	01.02.1986	2026
Paluel 4	PWR	1,330 MW	1,382 MW	01.02.1980	11.04.1986	01.06.1986	2026
