= Oherville =

- Commune
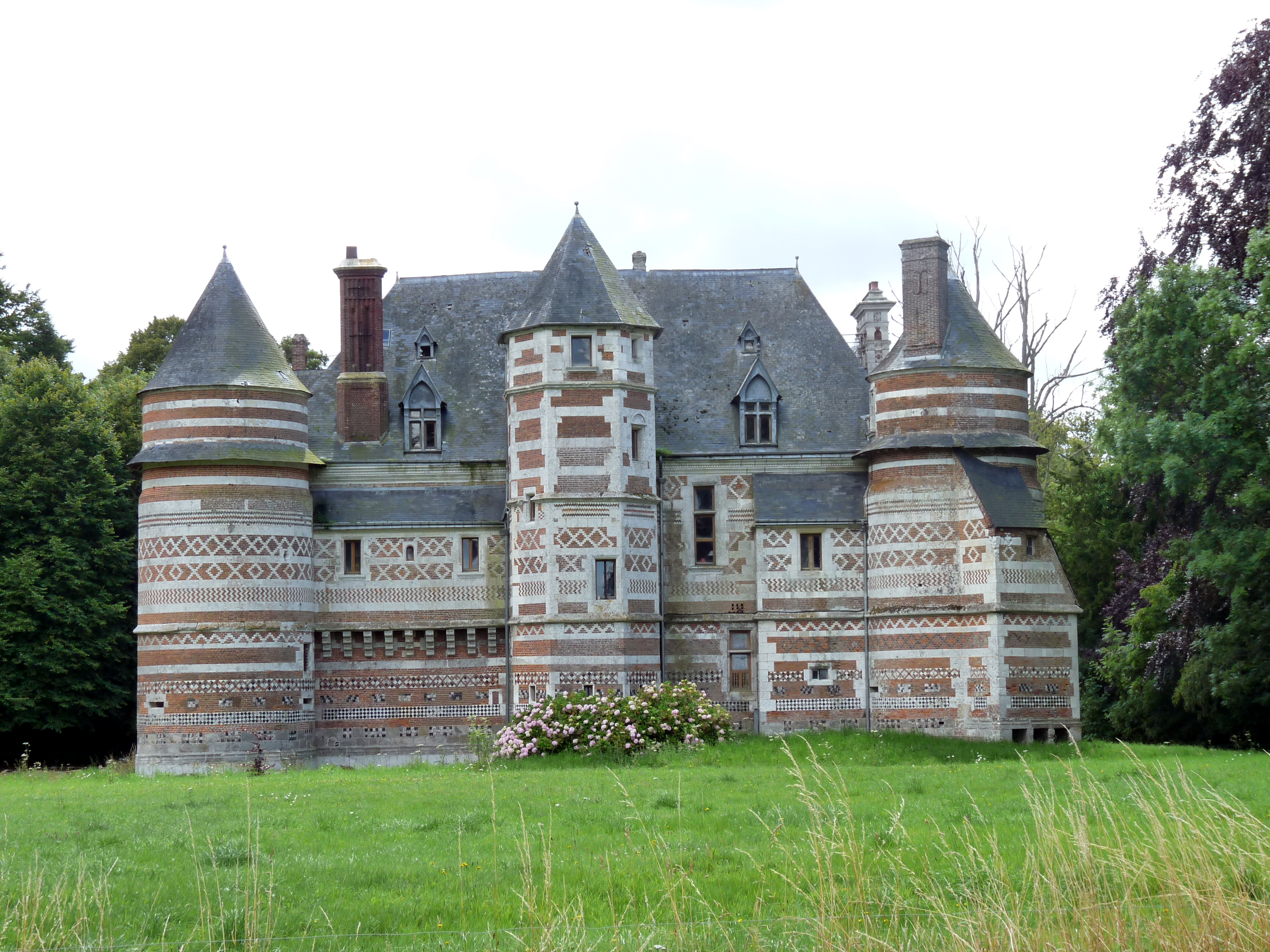
- Chateau d'Auffay

- Coat of arms
- Location of Oherville
- Location within France Location within Normandy
- Coordinates: 49°43′18″N 0°40′45″E
- Country: France
- Region: Normandy
- Department: Seine-Maritime
- Arrondissement: Dieppe
- Canton: Saint-Valery-en-Caux
- Intercommunality: CC Côte d'Albâtre

Government
  - Mayor (2026–32): Hervé Jolly
- Area^{1}: 4.57 km^{2} (1.76 sq mi)
- Elevation: 50 m (160 ft)
- Highest elevation: 142 m (466 ft)
- Lowest elevation: 42 m (138 ft)
- Population (2023): 253
  - Density: 55.4/km^{2} (143/sq mi)
- Time zone: UTC+01:00 (CET)
  - Summer (DST): UTC+02:00 (CEST)
- INSEE/Postal code: 76483 /76560
- ^{1} French Land Register data, which excludes lakes, ponds, glaciers > 1 km^{2} (0.386 sq mi or 247 acres) and river estuaries.

Oherville (French pronunciation: [ɔɛʁvij]) is a farming commune in the Seine-Maritime department in the Normandy region in northern France.

== Geography ==
It is located in the Pays de Caux, situated some 30 miles (48 km) northeast of Le Havre, at the junction of the D131 and D105 roads in the wooded valley of the river Durdent.

== History ==
The name comes is from the Germanic man's name ‘’Odardus’’ and from the Latin ‘’villa’’.

The commune is made up of the union of two hamlets, Oherville, first mentioned in 1240 and Auffray, mentioned in 1040.
The existence of a feudal motte indicates the presence of a medieval castle.

The first seigneurs of the place are mentioned in 1170. In the Middle Ages it was a dependency of the Duchy of Longueville. Oherville was a fiefdom under the lordship of Veauville until the 16th century. The village's position by the banks of the Durdent led to the construction of mills used for purposes including grinding corn, pressing of oil and the production of linen from flax. Traces of some mills can still be found.

=== Heraldry ===
| Arms of Oherville | The arms of Oherville are blazoned: Vert, on a bend sinister wavy argent between a trout argent and a garb (of wheat) Or, a mill wheel bendwise sinister in trian aspect proper. |

== Population ==
Historical population
| Year | Pop. | ±% p.a. |
|---|---|---|
| 1968 | 186 | — |
| 1975 | 168 | −1.44% |
| 1982 | 170 | +0.17% |
| 1990 | 164 | −0.45% |
| 1999 | 160 | −0.27% |
| 2007 | 183 | +1.69% |
| 2012 | 217 | +3.47% |
| 2017 | 228 | +0.99% |
| 2023 | 253 | +1.75% |
Source: INSEE

== Places of interest ==
- The church of Notre-Dame, dating from the sixteenth century.
- Auffray manorhouse and its dovecote, dating from the fifteenth century.
- Nonnettes manorhouse, dating from the sixteenth century.
- The remains of the medieval castle.
- The Moulin de Chanterive watermill.

== See also ==
- Communes of the Seine-Maritime department
