= Le Hanouard =

- Commune
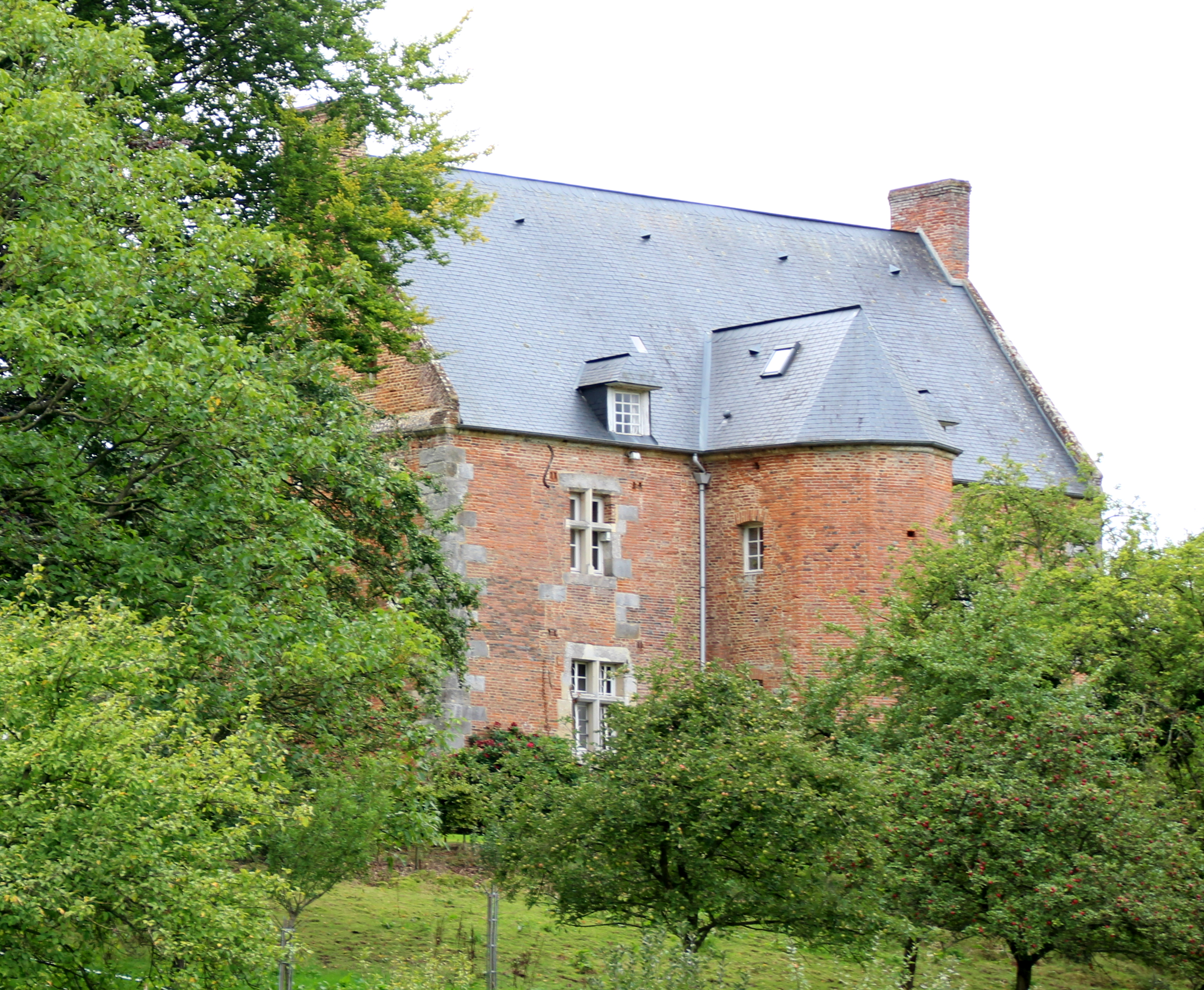
- The manor of Le Hanouard

- Coat of arms
- Location of Le Hanouard
- Location within France Location within Normandy
- Coordinates: 49°43′49″N 0°39′49″E
- Country: France
- Region: Normandy
- Department: Seine-Maritime
- Arrondissement: Dieppe
- Canton: Saint-Valery-en-Caux
- Intercommunality: CC Côte d'Albâtre

Government
  - Mayor (2026–32): Jacques Leballeur
- Area^{1}: 4.32 km^{2} (1.67 sq mi)
- Elevation: 85 m (279 ft)
- Highest elevation: 142 m (466 ft)
- Lowest elevation: 36 m (118 ft)
- Population (2023): 271
  - Density: 62.7/km^{2} (162/sq mi)
- Time zone: UTC+01:00 (CET)
  - Summer (DST): UTC+02:00 (CEST)
- INSEE/Postal code: 76339 /76450
- ^{1} French Land Register data, which excludes lakes, ponds, glaciers > 1 km^{2} (0.386 sq mi or 247 acres) and river estuaries.

Le Hanouard (French pronunciation: [lə anwaʁ]) is a commune in the Seine-Maritime department in the Normandy region in northern France.

== Geography ==
A farming village surrounded by woodland in the Pays de Caux, some 32 miles (51 km) northeast of Le Havre, at the junction of the D131 and D109 roads and by the banks of the river Durdent.

== Heraldry ==
Arms of Le Hanouard	The arms of Le Hanouard are blazoned : Gules, on a bend wavy argent between an apple tree and a leopard Or armed and langued azure, 3 millwheels sable.

== Population ==
Historical population
Year	Pop.	±% p.a.
1968	234	—
1975	226	−0.50%
1982	287	+3.47%
1990	266	−0.95%
1999	273	+0.29%
2007	218	−2.77%
2012	246	+2.45%
2017	249	+0.24%
2023	271	+1.42%
Source: INSEE

== Places of interest ==
- The church of St. Denis-et-Sainte-Cécile, dating from the seventeenth century.

== See also ==
- Communes of the Seine-Maritime department
