= Light rail =

Form of passenger urban rail transit

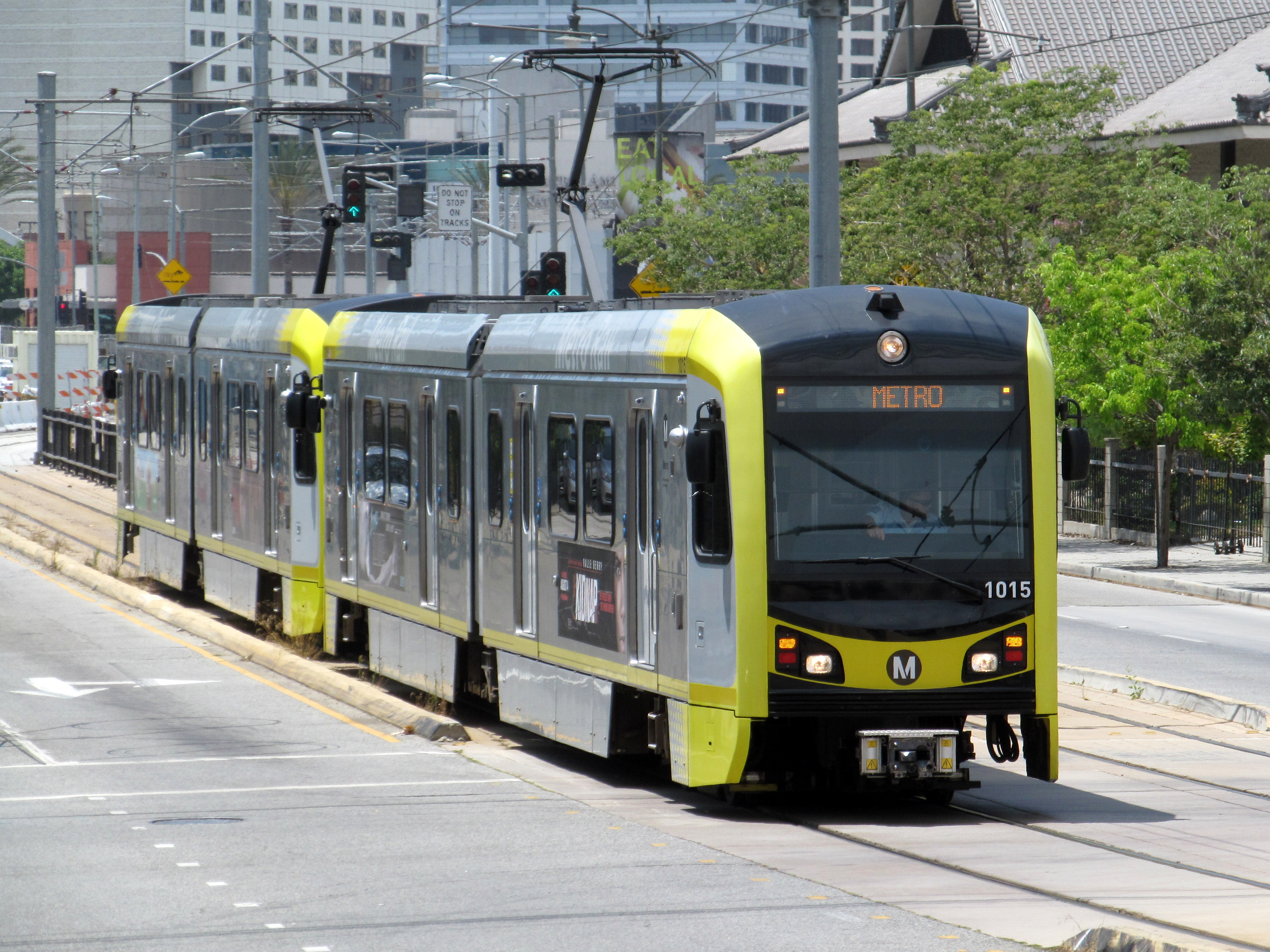
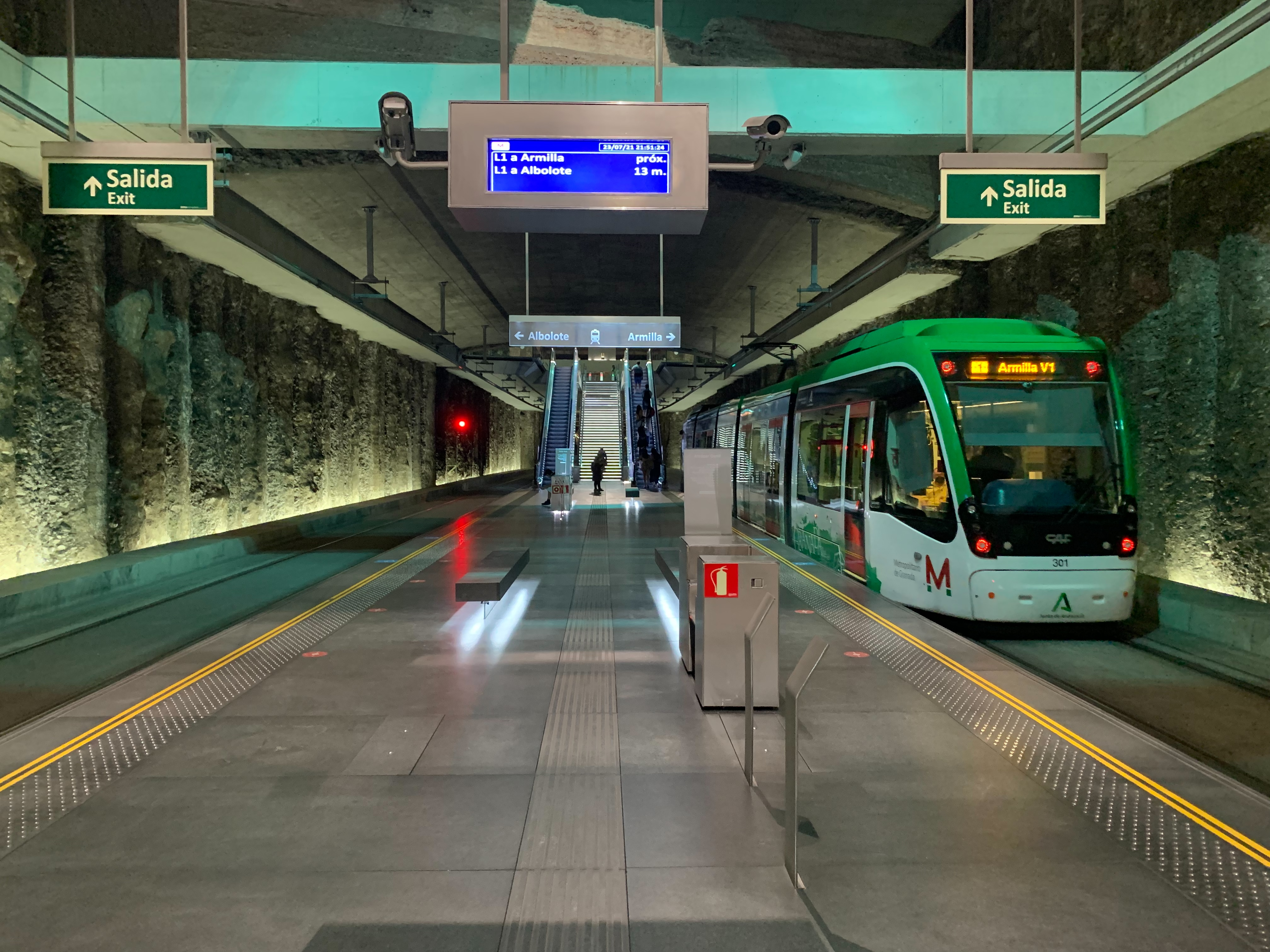
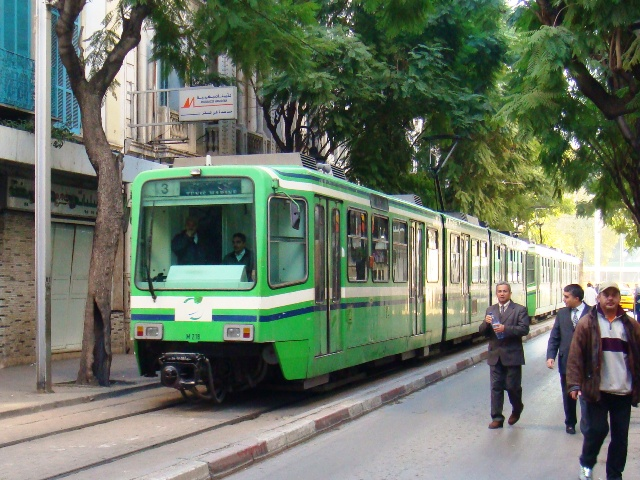
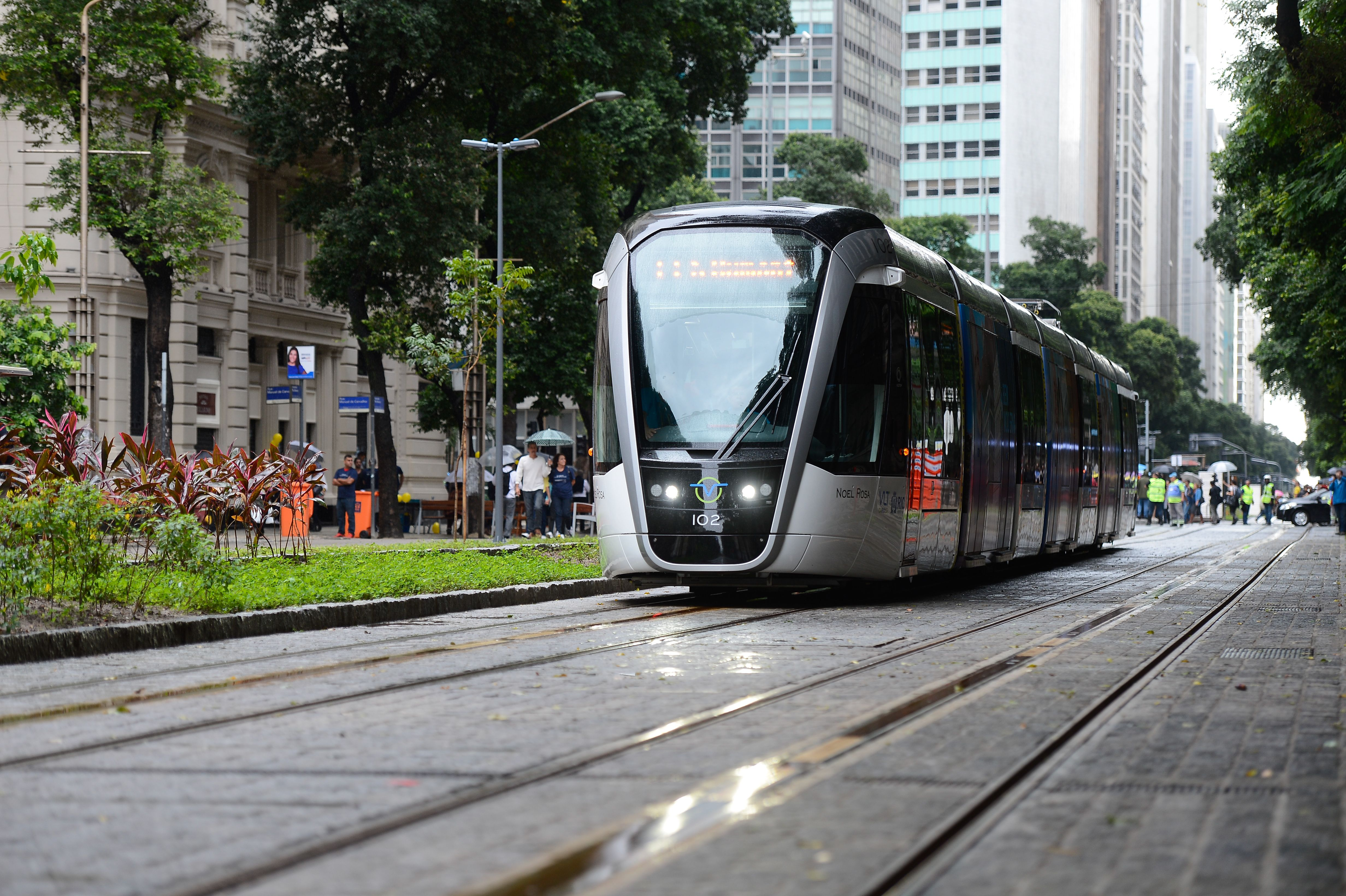
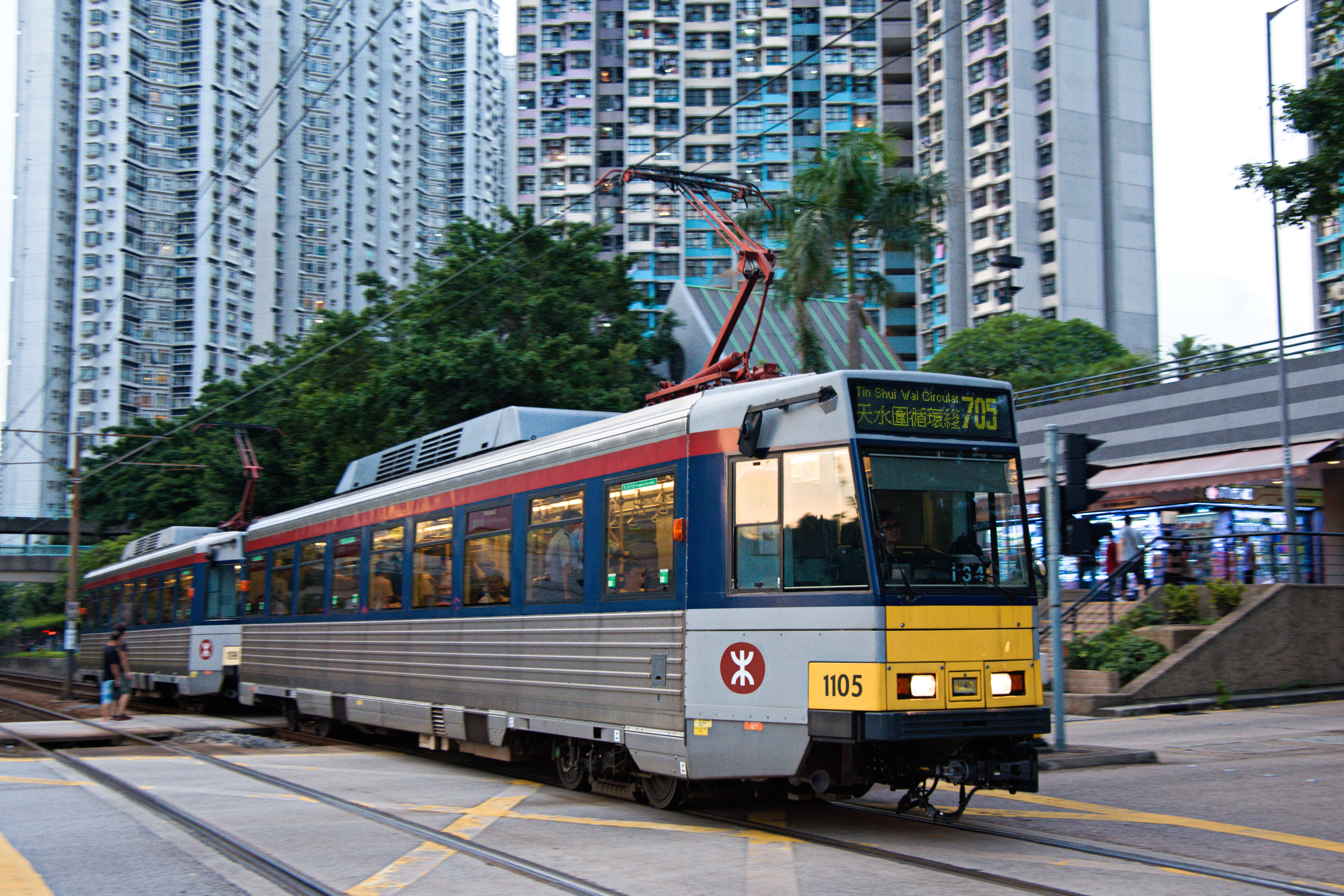
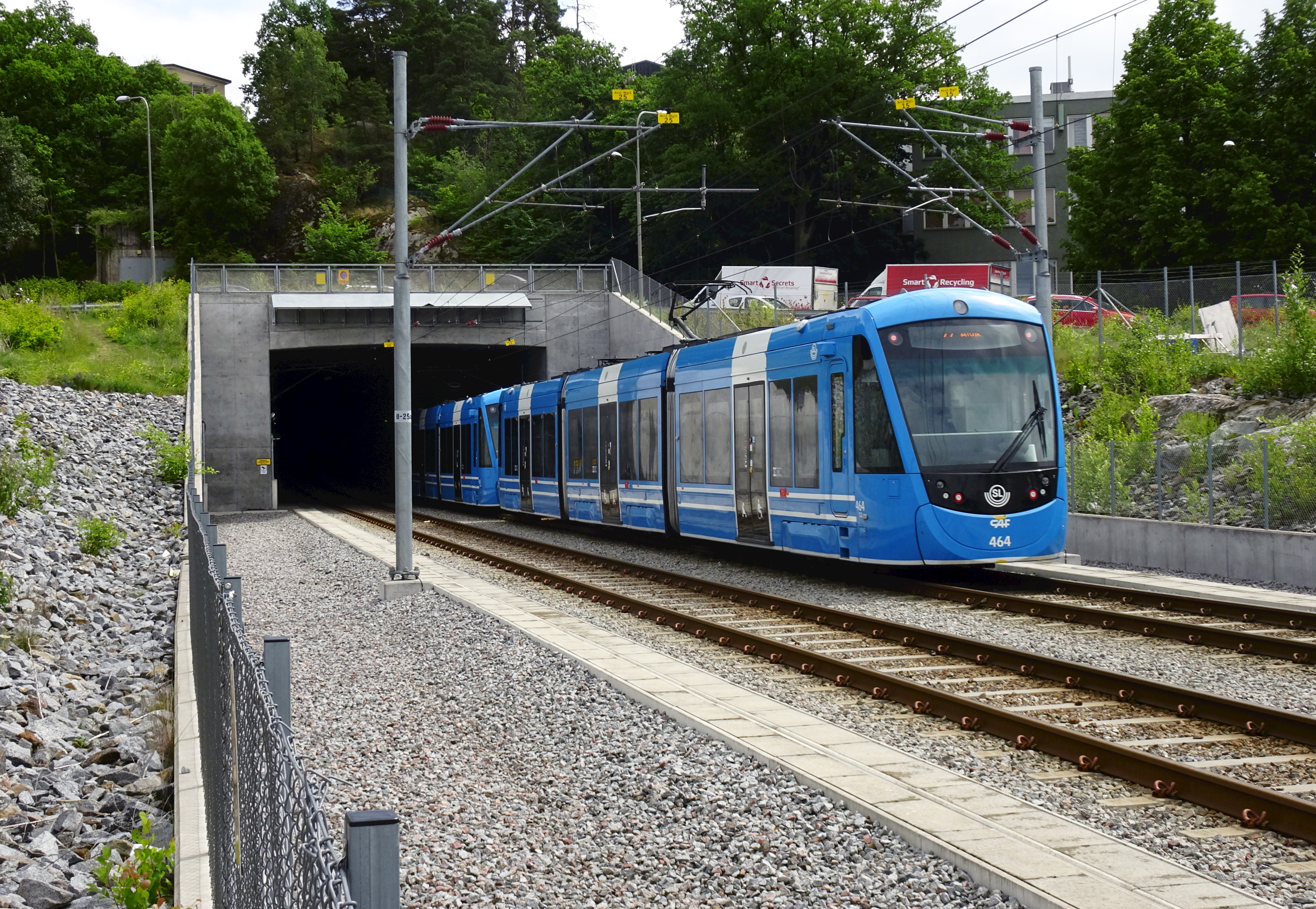
Gallery of light rail systems worldwide, from top left to bottom right: the Los Angeles Metro E Line, the Granada Metro, the Tunis Metro, the Rio de Janeiro Light Rail, the MTR Light Rail in Hong Kong, and Tvärbanan in Stockholm

Light rail (or light rail transit, abbreviated to LRT) is a form of passenger urban rail transit that uses rolling stock derived from tram technology, while having the capability to operate rolling stock on exclusive right of ways, on grade-separated section as well as in mixed traffic conditions. This capability gives LRT a greater flexibility than other transit modes. "Light" refers to the lighter passengers capacity of a line compared to rapid transit.

The term was coined in 1972 in the United States as an English equivalent for the German word Stadtbahn, meaning "city railroad". Different definitions exist in some countries, but in the United States, light rail operates primarily along exclusive rights-of-way and uses either individual tramcars or multiple units coupled together, with a lower capacity and speed than a long heavy rail passenger train or rapid transit system.

Narrowly defined, light rail transit uses rolling stock that is similar to that of a traditional tram, while operating at a higher capacity and speed, often on an exclusive right-of-way. In broader usage, light rail transit can include tram-like operations mostly on streets. Some light rail networks have characteristics closer to rapid transit. Only when these systems are fully grade-separated, they are referred to as light metros or light rail rapid transit (LRRT).

== Terminology ==
The term light rail was introduced in 1972 by the U.S. Urban Mass Transportation Administration (UMTA, predecessor to the Federal Transit Administration) to describe modernized streetcar systems in Europe and North America.

In Germany, the concept was known as Stadtbahn ("city rail"), but UMTA adopted the term light rail instead. The word light refers to lighter infrastructure and capacity requirements compared with heavy rail, rather than to physical weight. Mode classification is usually based on the type of right-of-way.

The American Public Transportation Association (APTA) defines light rail as:

...a mode of transit service (also called streetcar, tramway, or trolley) operating single cars or short trains on fixed rails, often partly separated from traffic. Vehicles are typically electric, powered from overhead lines via trolley pole or pantograph, operated by an onboard driver, and may feature either high-platform or low-floor boarding.

In international usage, light rail generally denotes newer tram or streetcar systems, ranging from street-running lines to partly grade-separated networks. People movers are typically lower in capacity, while monorail and automated guideway transit are separate technologies with more specialized applications.

Light rail is distinct from the British English term light railway, which refers to lightly regulated, low-speed mainline railways.

=== Varieties of English ===
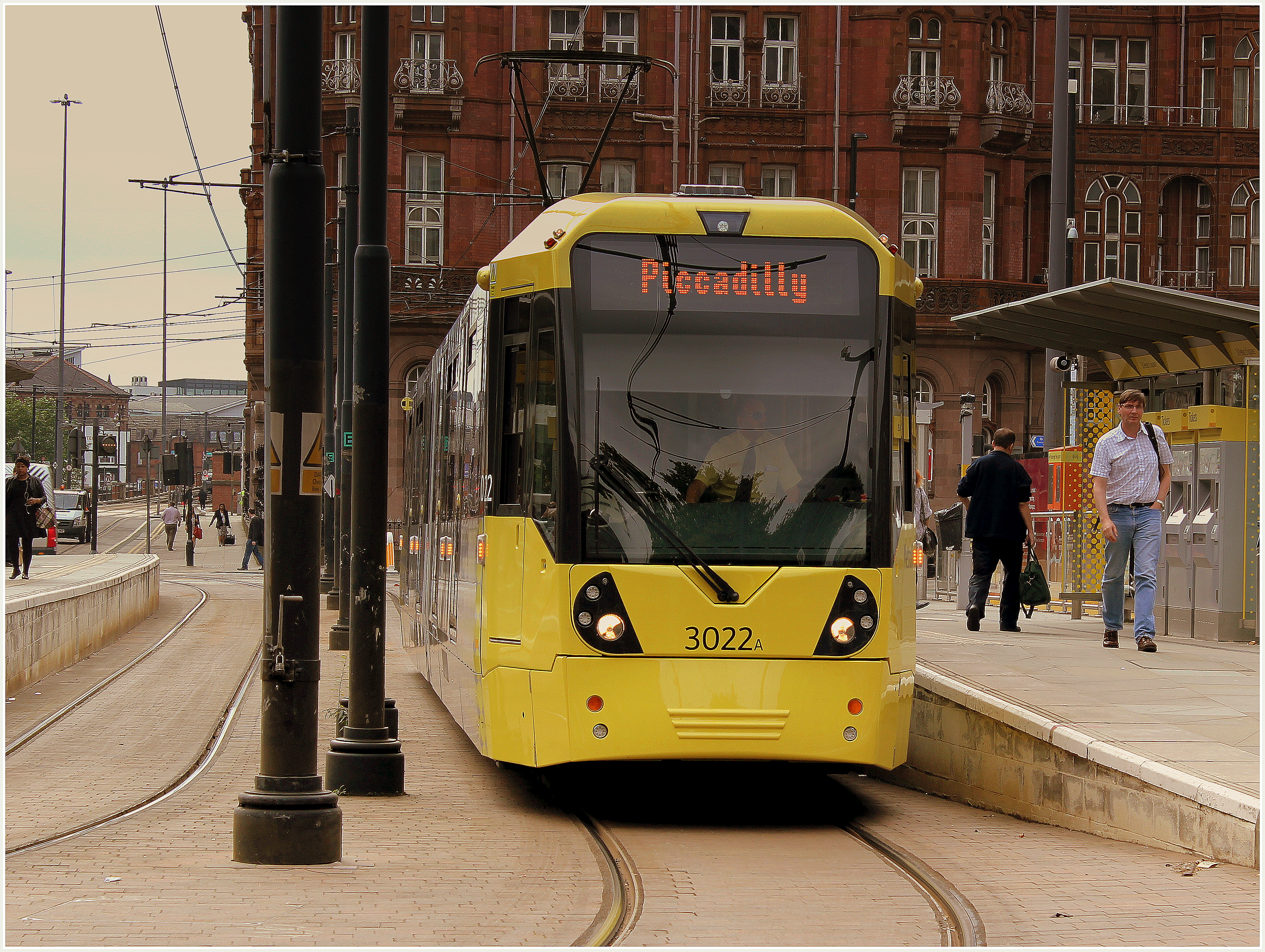
The Manchester Metrolink, the UK's largest light rail system

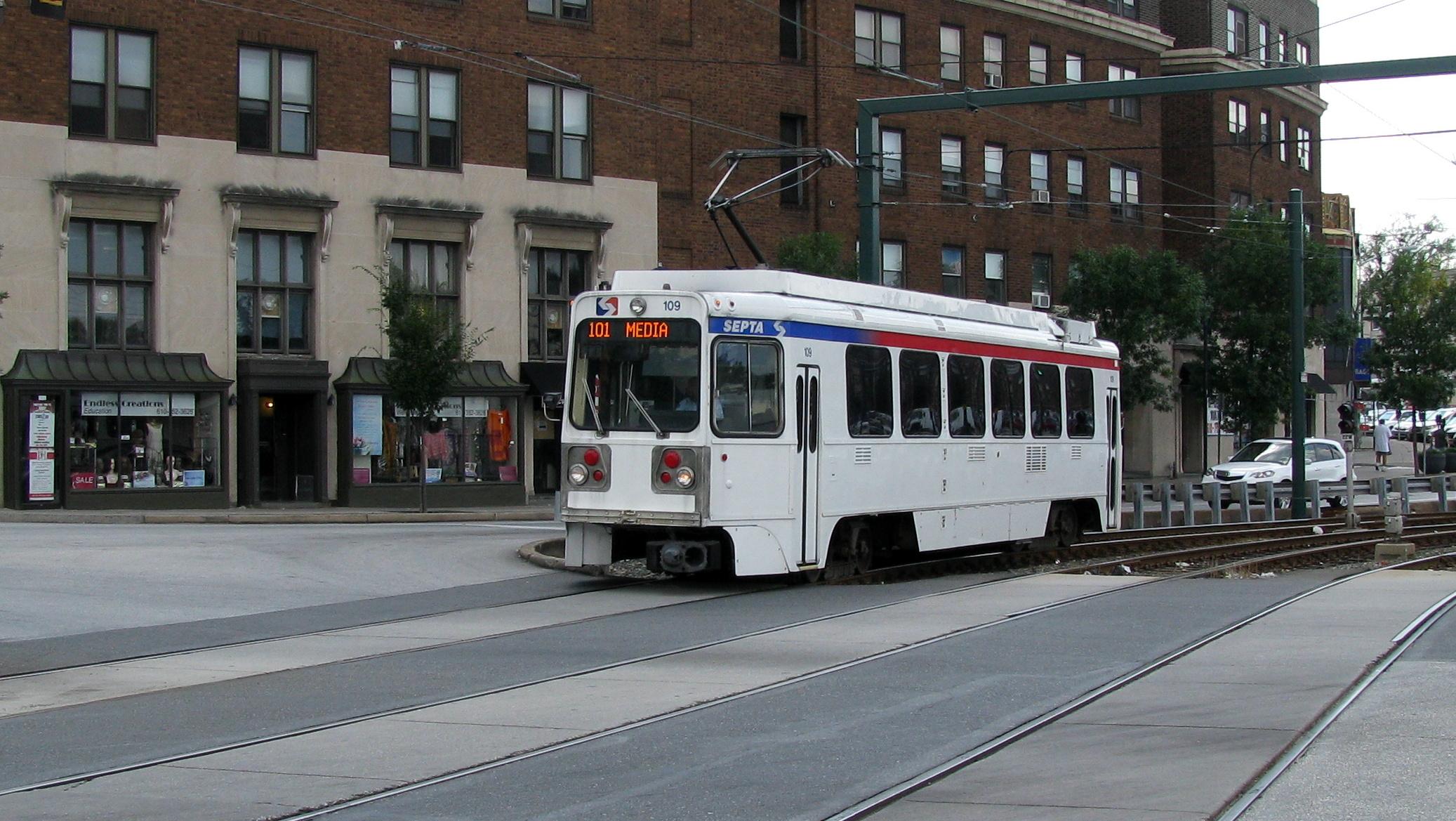
SEPTA trolley at 69th Street Terminal, near Philadelphia

The term light rail helps avoid regional differences in terminology. In the UK, Australia, Ireland and New Zealand tram refers to a street-running rail vehicle, while in North America it can also mean an aerial tramway or, in amusement parks, a land train. Similarly, trolley means streetcar in North America.

In North America, streetcar commonly refers to older vehicles operating in mixed traffic, while light rail is used for newer systems that operate mostly on reserved track. The American term street railway (with vehicles called streetcars) emerged in the 19th century, influenced by the German word Straßenbahn ("street railway"). While Britain abandoned most tramways after World War II, several North American cities—including Toronto, Boston, Philadelphia, San Francisco, Pittsburgh, Newark, Cleveland, and New Orleans—retained theirs. These cities later adopted the term light rail when introducing modern systems alongside older streetcars. Since the 1980s, Portland, Oregon has developed all three types: light rail, streetcar, and aerial tram.

Heavy rail refers to higher-capacity, higher-speed systems such as the London Underground or New York City Subway. Conventional passenger and freight railways are also classified as heavy rail. The main distinction is that light rail vehicles can, where necessary, operate in mixed street traffic.

== History ==
=== Precursors ===
By the late 19th century, some cities began placing tramways underground to reduce congestion. Early examples include the Murray Hill Tunnel in New York, adapted for streetcars in 1870, Marseille's Noailles station in 1893, and Boston's Tremont Street subway in 1897, the first purpose-built tram subway in North America and a precursor to today's MBTA Green Line. London's Kingsway tramway subway opened in 1906 to connect tram networks and operated until 1952.

=== Early systems ===
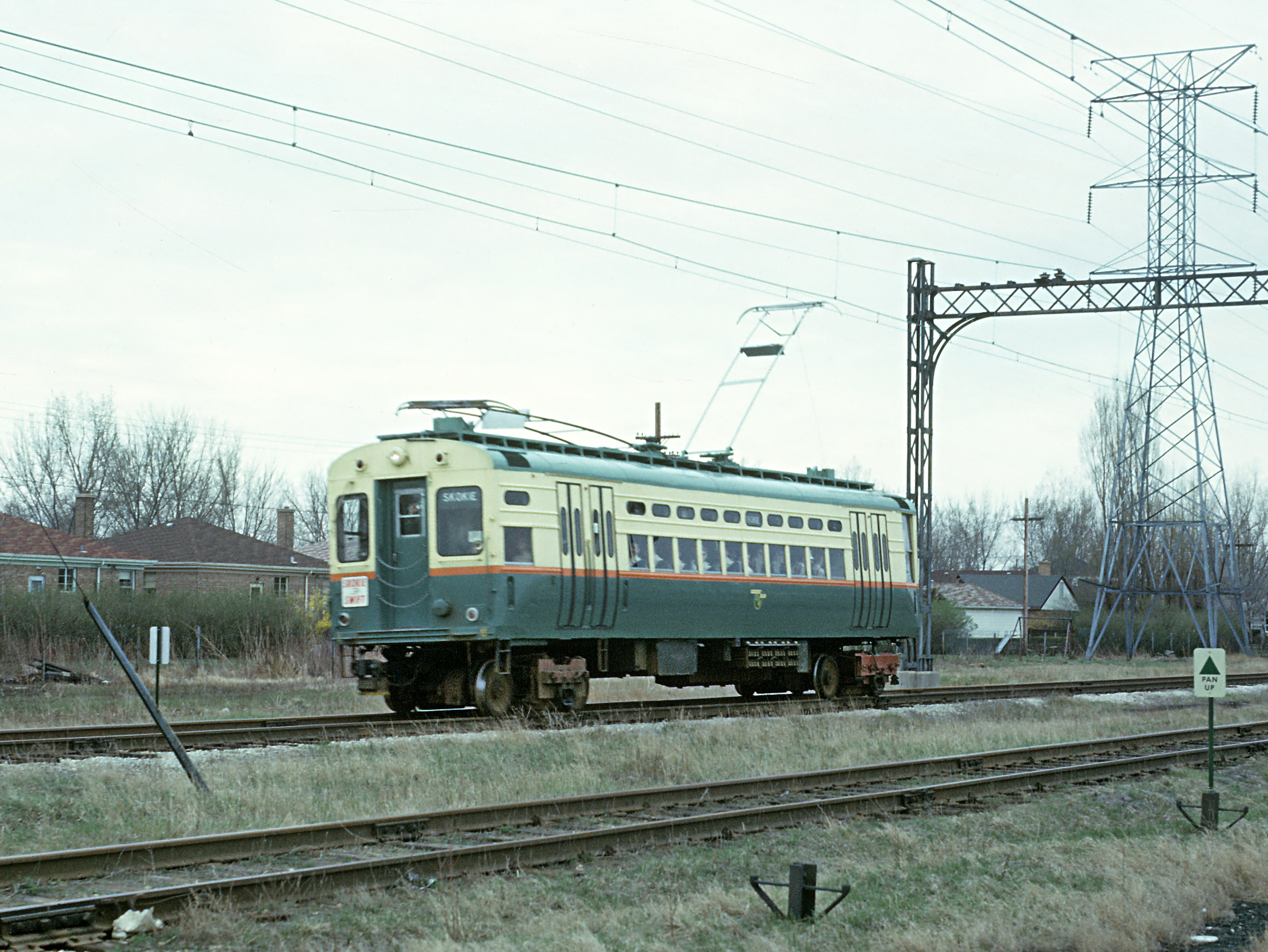
Skokie Swift service in 1964

The Shaker Heights Rapid Transit in Cleveland (1920s) provided an early model of a suburban rail line upgraded for tram-like operation and is now part of the RTA Rapid Transit. In Europe, a suburban railway in The Hague was converted to tram operation in 1927, while in Boston the Highland branch was converted in 1959 to create what became the Green Line D branch, boosting ridership with modern PCC cars. In 1964 Chicago's experimental Skokie Swift demonstrated features later adopted by many U.S. light rail systems.

=== Post-war emergence ===
Many traditional tram and streetcar systems in the United Kingdom, United States, and elsewhere were closed after the 1950s as investment shifted to cars and buses. Leeds and Glasgow briefly built modernized tram lines during the 1940s, but by 1962 Britain had abandoned all tramways, except for in Blackpool. Modern light rail developed largely in postwar West Germany, where many tram networks were upgraded rather than abandoned. These Stadtbahn systems introduced features such as high-capacity vehicles, dedicated alignments, and underground city-center tunnels. With the exception of Hamburg, nearly all large and most medium-sized German cities retained trams and modernized them into light rail. Similar modernization took place in Zurich, Rotterdam, The Hague, Gothenburg, Brussels, and in Central and Eastern Europe, notably Ostrava.

In the United States, American planner H. Dean Quinby defined the concept of a "limited tramway" in 1962, distinguishing it from traditional streetcars by features such as articulated vehicles, multiple doors, and higher capacity.

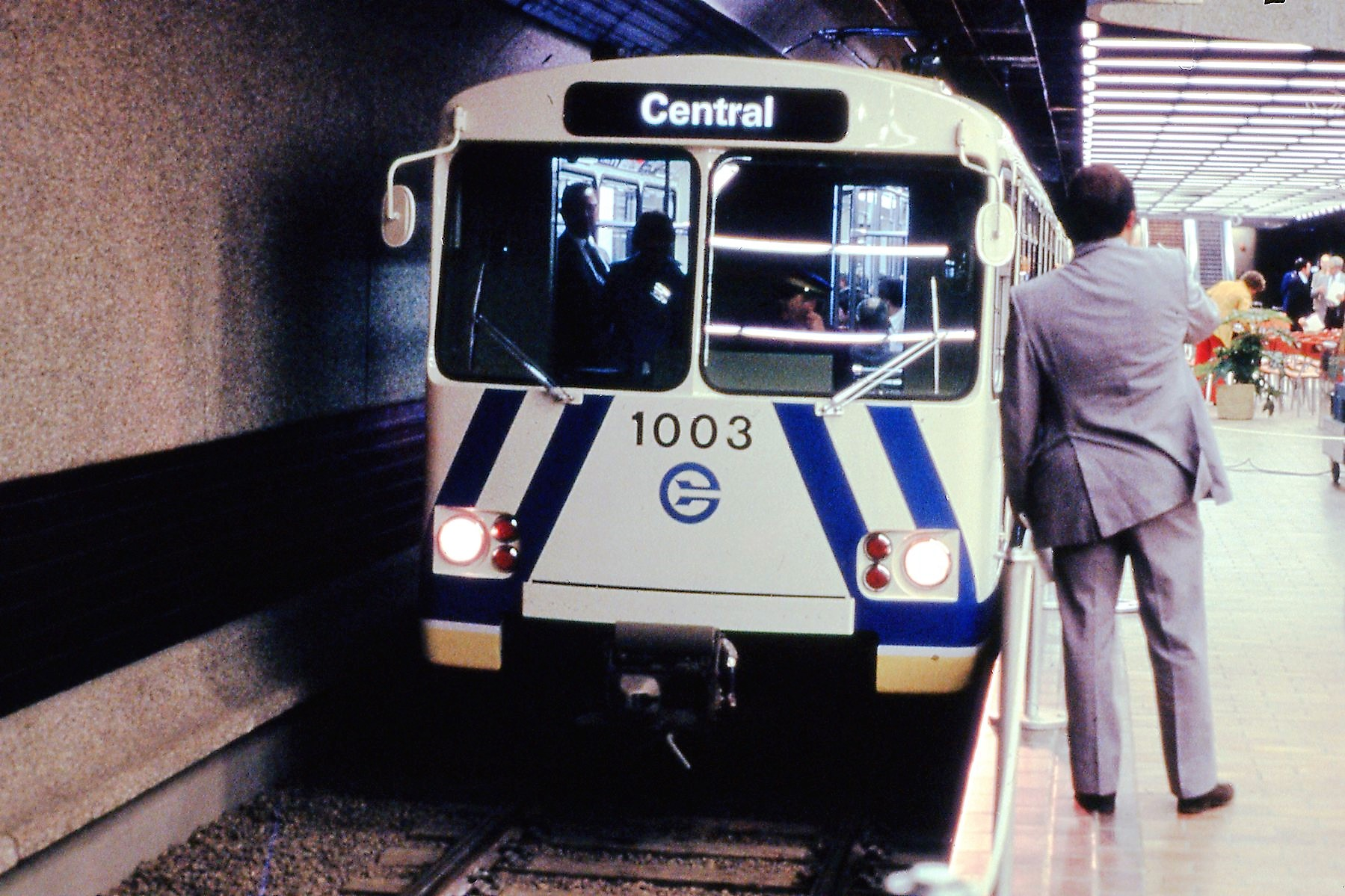
Testing a German LRV for the Edmonton LRT

The term light rail transit was introduced in North America in 1972 to describe these upgraded systems. The first of the new generation opened in 1978 in Edmonton, Alberta, using German Siemens-Duewag U2 vehicles, followed by Calgary and San Diego. These proved successful and inspired many more U.S., Canadian, and Mexican light rail systems.

=== Global expansion ===
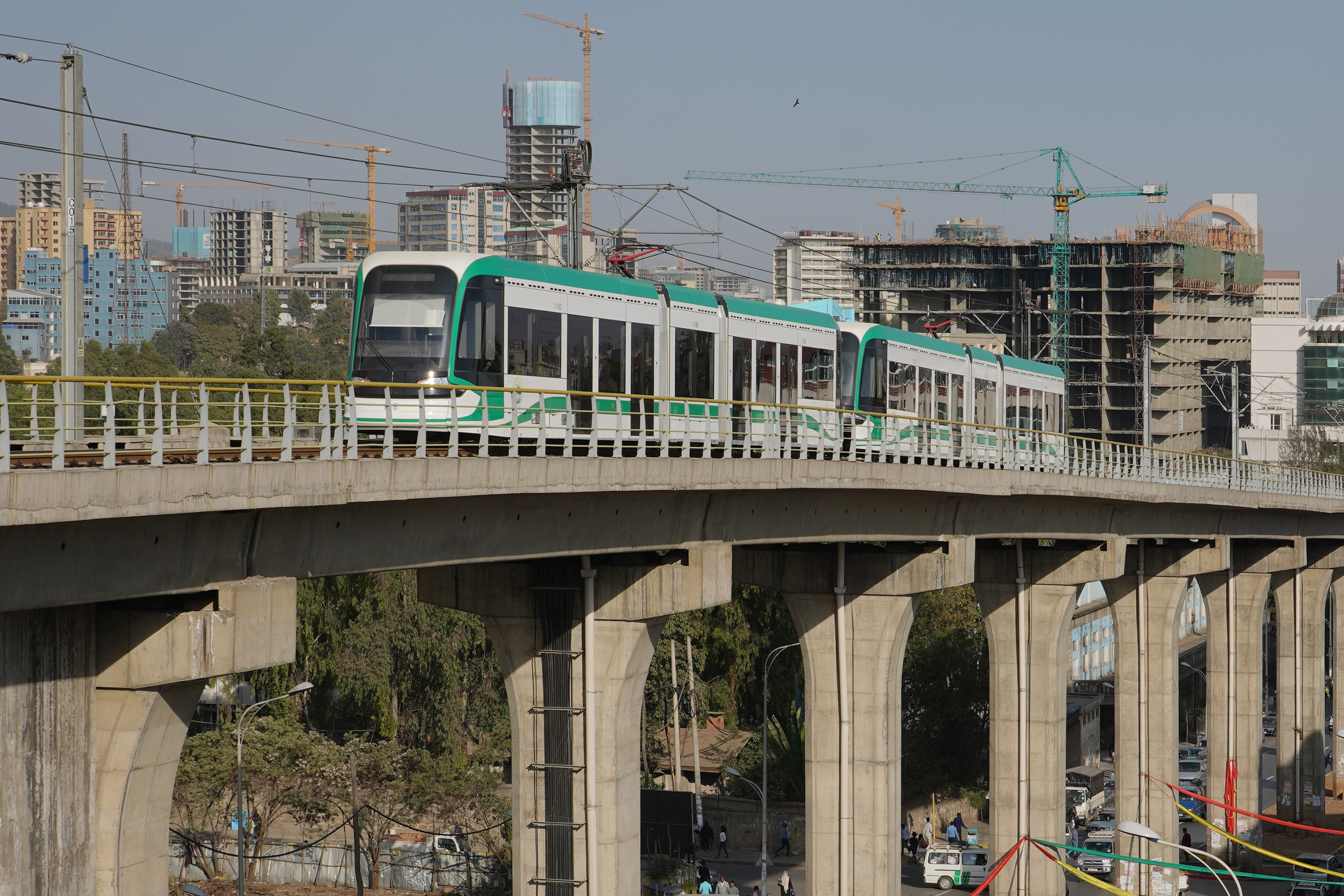
Light Rail in Addis Ababa, Ethiopia

From the 1980s onward, light rail and modern tramways experienced a renewed expansion worldwide. In Europe, new networks were built in cities that had abandoned trams, such as Nantes, which reopened its tramway in 1985, as well as Grenoble, Paris, Strasbourg, Bordeaux, Dublin, Barcelona, and Bergen. In Britain, modern light rail returned with the Tyne and Wear Metro (1980), Manchester Metrolink (1992), South Yorkshire Supertram (1994) and Edinburgh Trams (2014).

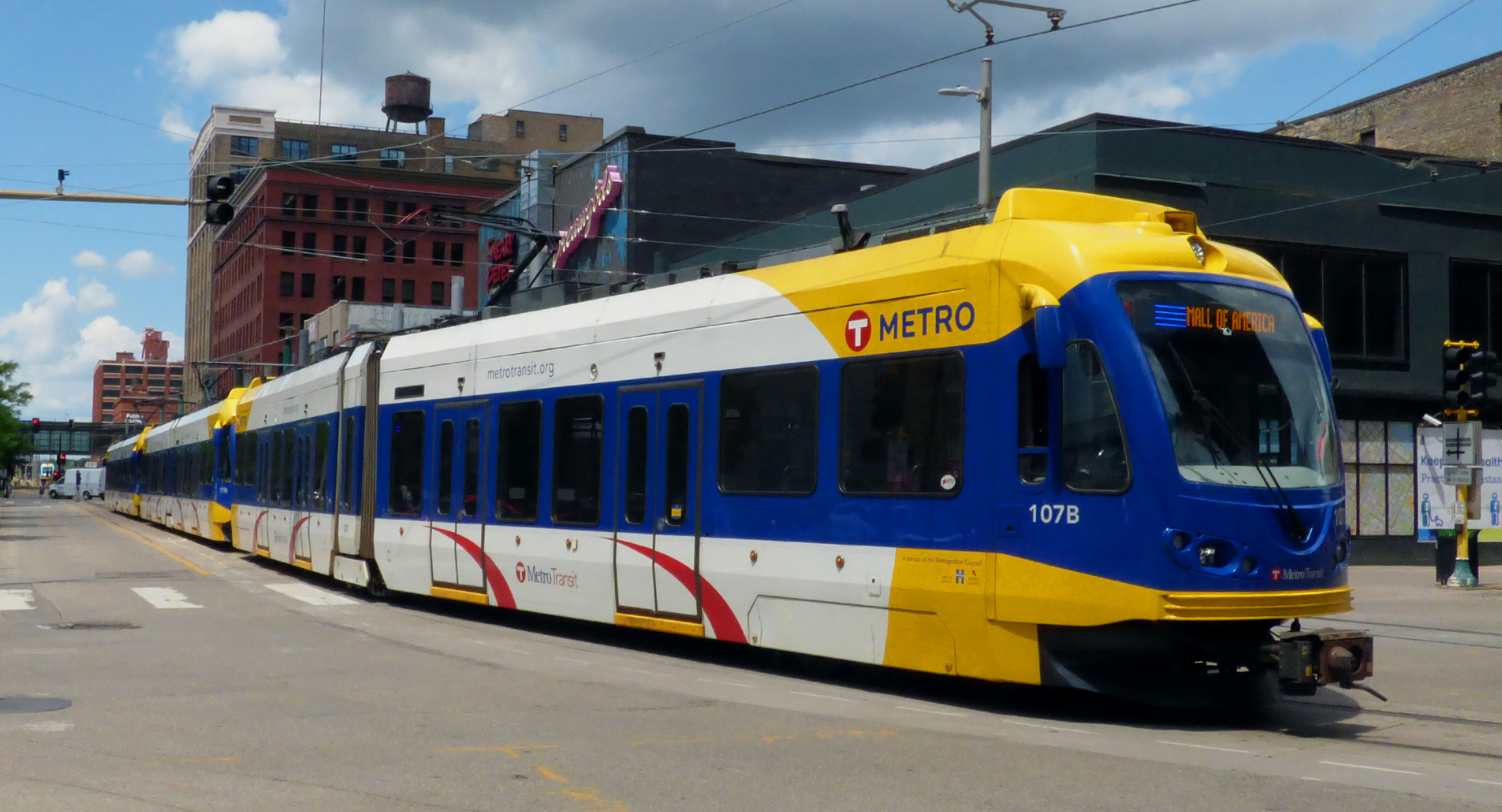
LRT in Minneapolis–Saint Paul

In North America, the San Diego Trolley (1981) became a model for later projects, and the number of U.S. systems roughly doubled between the 1990s and 2010s with expansions in Portland, Los Angeles, Denver, Dallas, Minneapolis–Saint Paul and Seattle. Canada added the Ion in Waterloo and the Confederation Line in Ottawa (both 2019), while Australia introduced the Sydney Light Rail in 1997.

In Asia, the Toyama Light Rail opened in 2006 as Japan's first new tramway in decades. Light rail systems also opened in several Chinese cities, such as Shenyang, Nanjing, Guangzhou, Beijing and Shanghai.

In Africa and the Middle East, new light rail was introduced in Tunis (1985), Rabat (2011), Algiers (2011), Jerusalem (2011), Casablanca (2012), Dubai (2014), Addis Ababa (2015) and Lusail (2022).

In South America, projects included the Metrotranvía in Mendoza (2012), the Ayacucho Tram in Medellín (2016) and the VLT Carioca in Rio de Janeiro (2016) and the Tramway in Cuenca (2020).

== Types ==
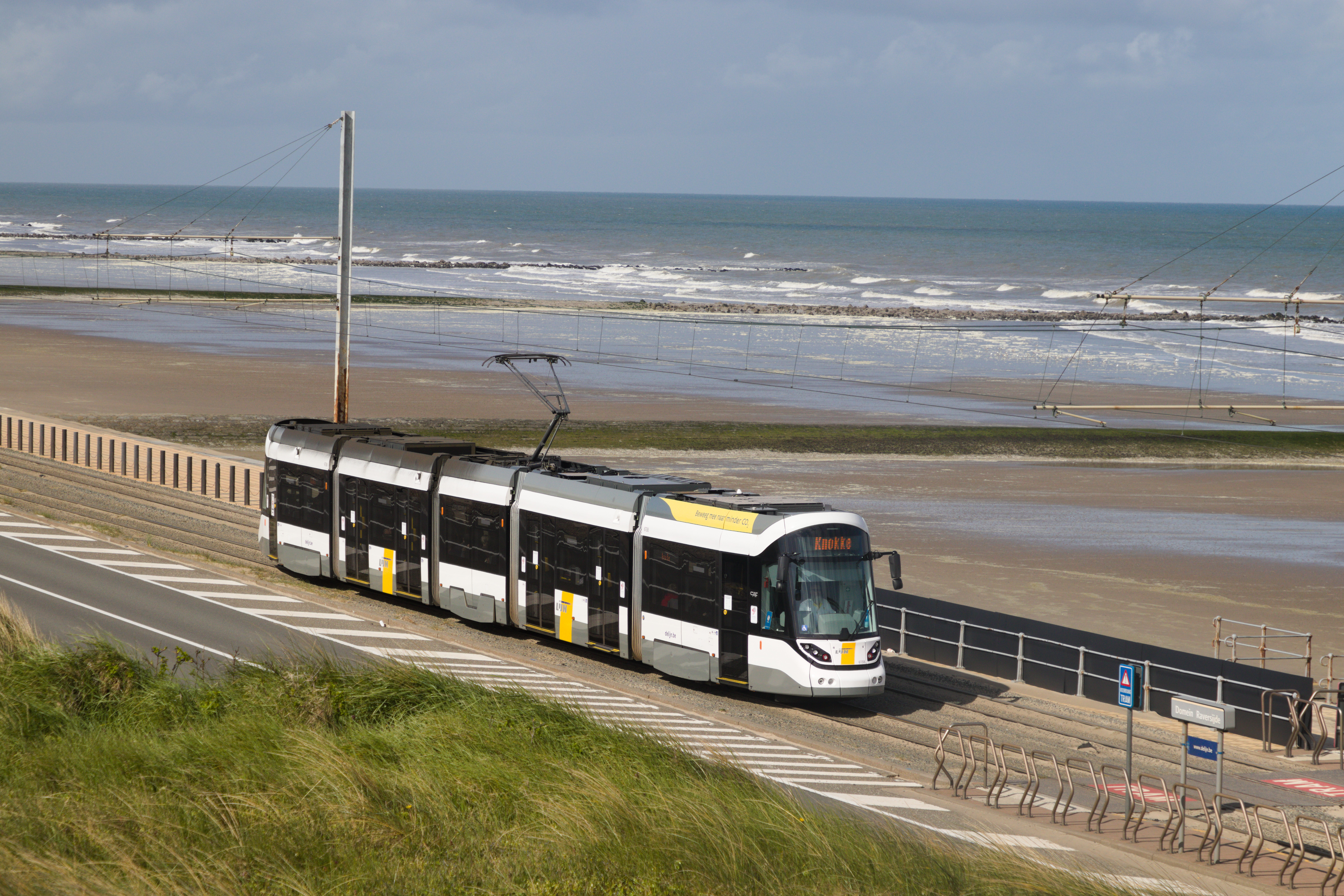
The Coast Tram operates over 67 km (42 mi) in Belgium connecting several town centres

It can be hard to distinguish light rail from other forms of urban and commuter rail. A system termed light rail in one city may be considered a streetcar or tram system in another. Conversely, some lines that are called light rail are very close to rapid transit. In recent years, new terms such as light metro have been used to describe medium-capacity systems. Some diesel light rail systems, such as Sprinter, bear little similarity to urban rail, and could alternatively be classified as commuter rail with lightweight trains.

There is a history of what would now be considered light rail vehicles operating on heavy rail rapid transit tracks in the US, especially in the case of interurban streetcars. Notable examples are Lehigh Valley Transit trains running on the Philadelphia and Western Railroad high-speed third rail line (now the Norristown High-Speed Line).

=== Flexibility ===
Light rail corridors may constitute a fully segregated corridor, a dedicated right-of-way on a street, an on-street corridor shared with other traffic, a corridor shared with other public transport, or a corridor shared with pedestrians, resulting in a much higher flexibility than heavy rail.

Many systems have mixed characteristics. Indeed, with proper engineering, a rail line could run along a street, then go underground, and then run along an elevated viaduct. For example, the Los Angeles Metro Rail's A Line has sections that could alternatively be described as a tramway, a light metro, and, in a narrow sense, rapid transit. This is especially common in the United States, where there is not a popularly perceived distinction between these different types of urban rail systems.

=== Lower capacity ===
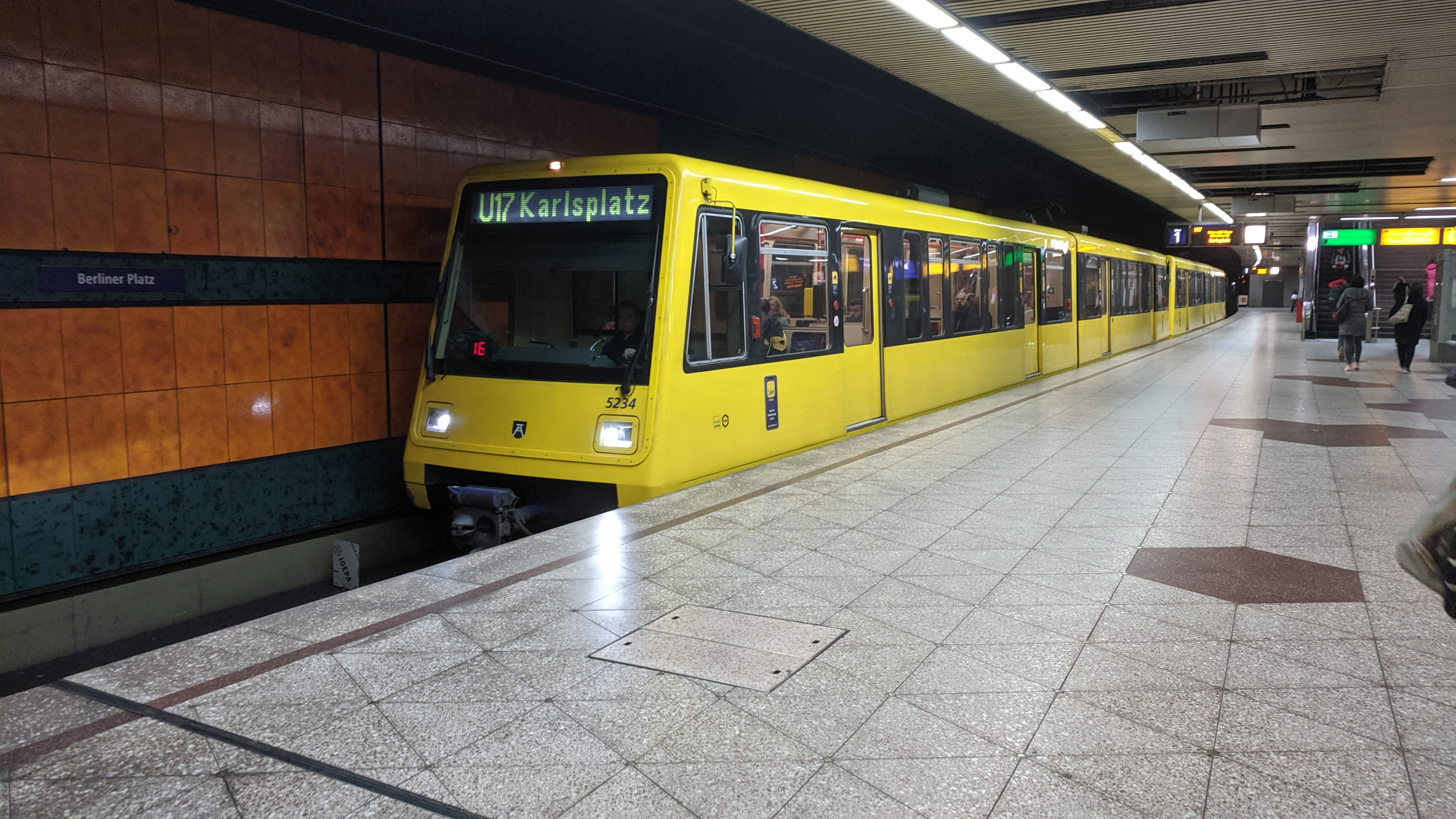
Berliner Platz station in Essen.

The most difficult distinction to draw is that between low-floor light rail and streetcar or tram systems. There is a significant amount of overlap between the technologies; similar rolling stock may be used for either, and it is common to classify streetcars or trams as a subcategory of light rail rather than as a distinct type of transportation. However, some distinctions can be made, though systems may combine elements of both. Low-floor light rail lines tend to follow a reserved right-of-way and have trains receiving priority at intersections, and tend not to operate in mixed traffic, enabling higher operating speeds. Light rail lines tend to have fewer stops than tramways, and operate over a longer distance. Light rail cars are often coupled into multiple units of two to four cars.

=== Higher capacity ===
Light rail systems may also exhibit attributes of rapid transit systems, including having downtown subways, as in San Francisco and Seattle. These partially grade-separated light rail lines are sometimes called "semi-metros". This type of light rail emerged when the first subway in Boston opened in 1897 and became popular again in Europe from the 1950s onwards. The development of technology for low-floor and catenary-free trams facilitates the construction of such mixed systems with only short and shallow underground sections below critical intersections, as the required clearance height can be reduced significantly compared to conventional light rail vehicles.

=== Light rail operating on mainline railroads ===
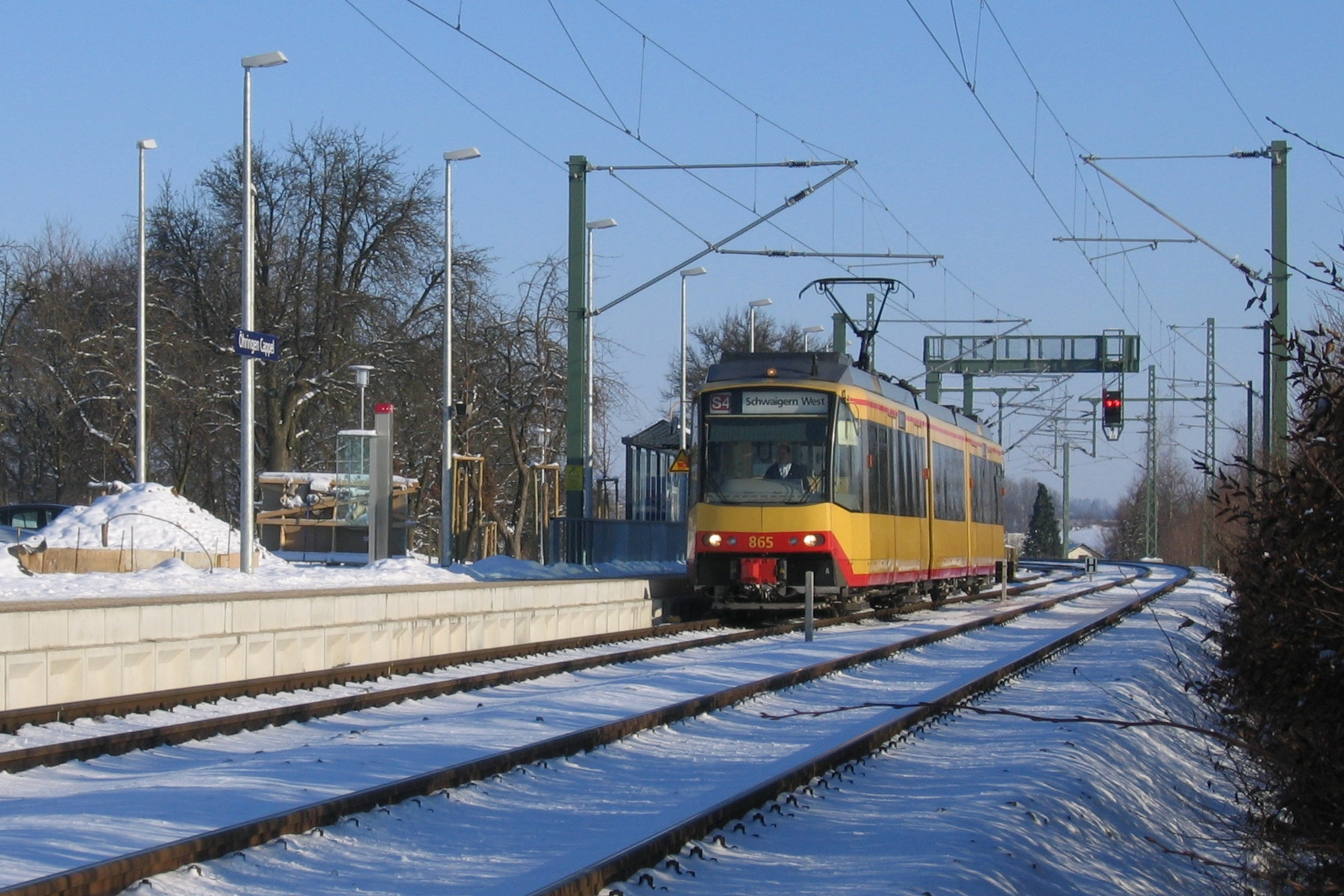
On the Karlsruhe Stadtbahn, trams can share mainline tracks with heavy rail trains.

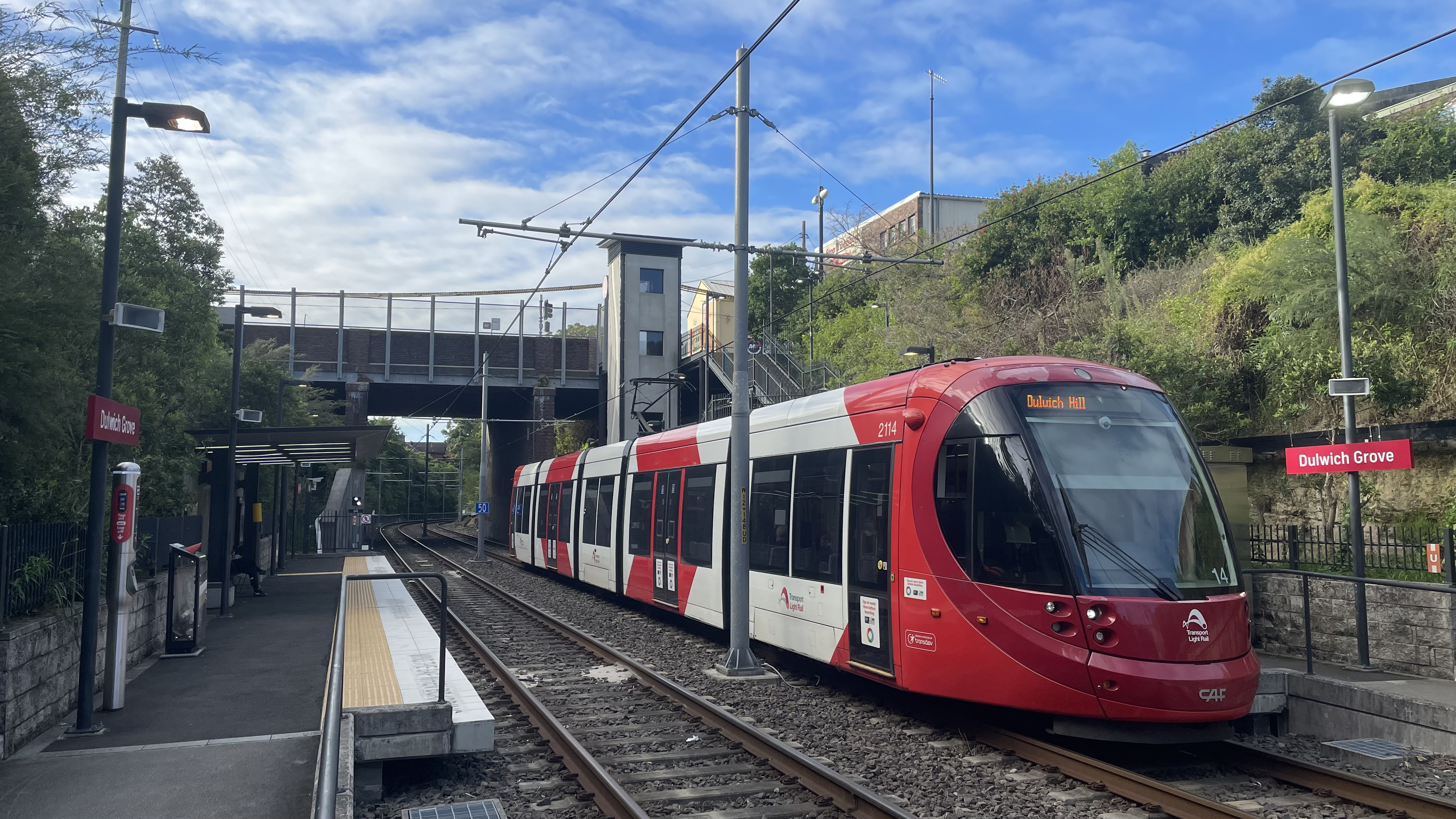
The Inner West Light Rail in Sydney runs mostly along a former heavy rail corridor.

Light rail can be designed to address a gap in interurban transportation between mainline rail and bus services, carrying high passenger numbers more quickly than local buses and more cheaply than mainline trains. Around Karlsruhe, Kassel, and Saarbrücken in Germany, dual-voltage light rail trains partly use mainline railroad tracks, sharing these tracks with mainline rail trains. This allows commuters to ride directly into the city center, rather than taking a mainline train only as far as a central station and then having to change to a tram. In France, similar tram-trains are in use in Paris, Mulhouse, and Strasbourg; further plans exist. In 2022, Spain opened the Cádiz TramBahia, where trams share track with commuter and long-distance trains from the main terminus in the city and curve off to serve cities without a rail connection. Some of the issues involved in such schemes are:

- compatibility of the safety systems
- power supply of the track to the power used by the vehicles (frequently different voltages, rarely third rail vs overhead wires)
- width of the vehicles to the position of the platforms
- height of the platforms

In some cases, tram-trains use previously abandoned or lightly used heavy rail lines in addition to or instead of active mainline tracks, like the Manchester Metrolink. In the San Diego region, the San Diego and Arizona Eastern Railway was used to create the initial stage of the light rail network of the San Diego Trolley. In the Netherlands, this concept was first applied on the RijnGouweLijn, and was followed by the RandstadRail project.

=== System-wide considerations ===
Many light rail systems—even fairly old ones—have a combination of both on- and off-road sections. In some countries (especially in Europe), only the latter is described as light rail, whereas trams running on mixed rights-of-way are not. However, the requirement for saying that a rail line is "separated" can be quite low—sometimes concrete "buttons" to discourage automobile drivers from getting onto the tracks will suffice. Some systems, such as Seattle's Link, had on-road mixed sections but were closed to regular road traffic, with light rail vehicles and buses both operating along a common right-of-way. The Link was converted to full separation in 2019.

=== Floor height ===
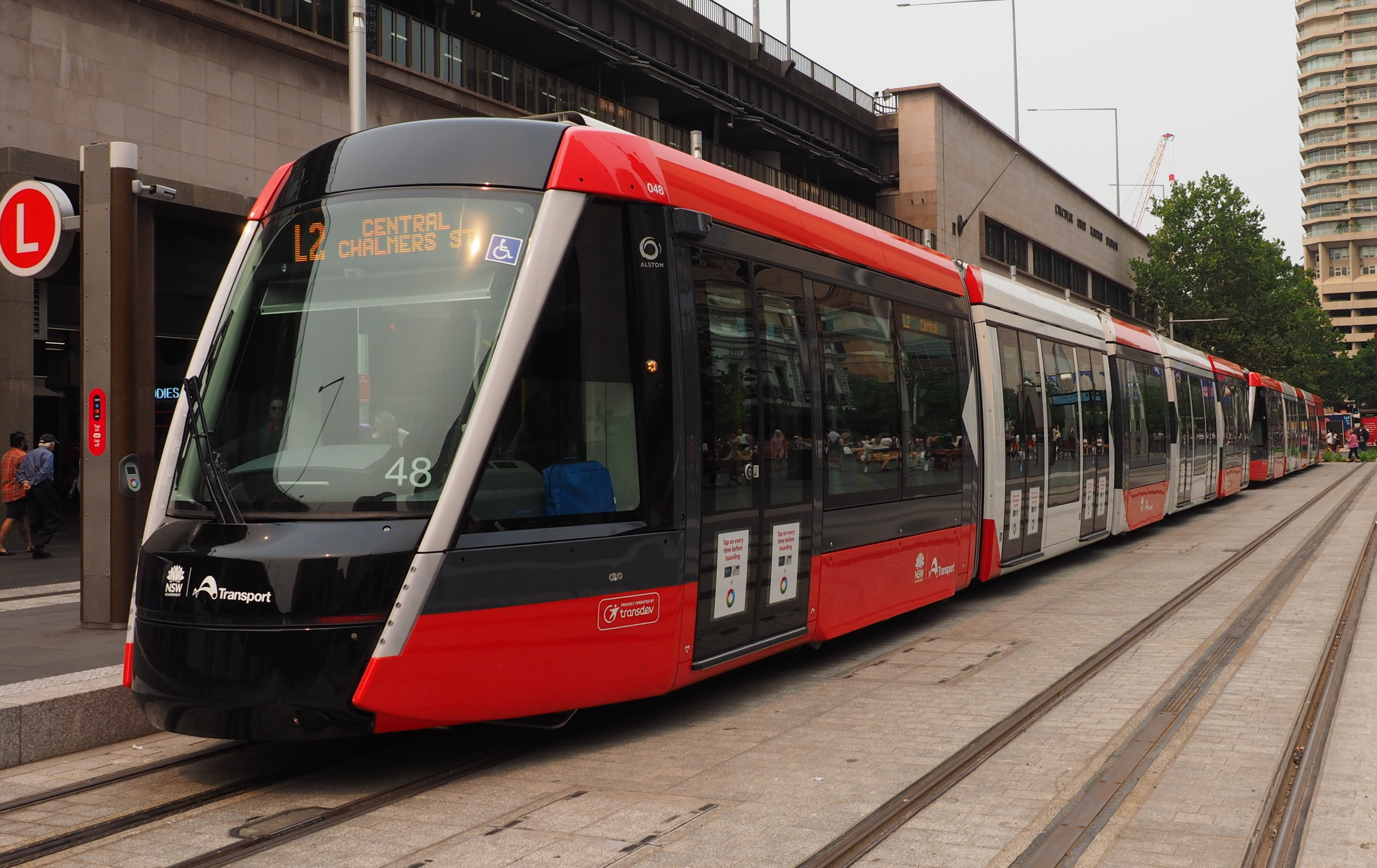
Low floor light-rail vehicles on the Sydney Light Rail system.

Low-floor LRVs have the advantage of a low-floor design, allowing them to load passengers directly from low-rise platforms that can be little more than raised curbs. High-floor light rail systems also exist, featuring larger stations.

=== Speed and stop frequency ===
Low top speed is not always a differentiating characteristic between light rail and other systems. For example, the Siemens S70 LRVs used in the Houston METRORail and other North American LRT systems have a top speed of 55–71.5 mph (88.51–115.1 km/h) depending on the system, while the trains on the all-underground Montreal Metro can only reach a top speed of 72 km/h (44.74 mph). LACMTA light rail vehicles have higher top and average speeds than Montreal Metro or New York City Subway trains.

== Infrastructure ==
Light rail systems operate between heavy rapid transit and conventional street-level trams. Construction costs are typically lower than for metro systems, but building infrastructure can still be significant, sometimes leading to phased development or partial completion of lines. Light rail vehicles can often be compatible with existing tram networks, avoiding the need for entirely separate infrastructure or rolling stock. In some cases, multiple at-grade branches are used to maximize the capacity of tunneled sections.

=== Tracks ===
==== Right-of-way ====
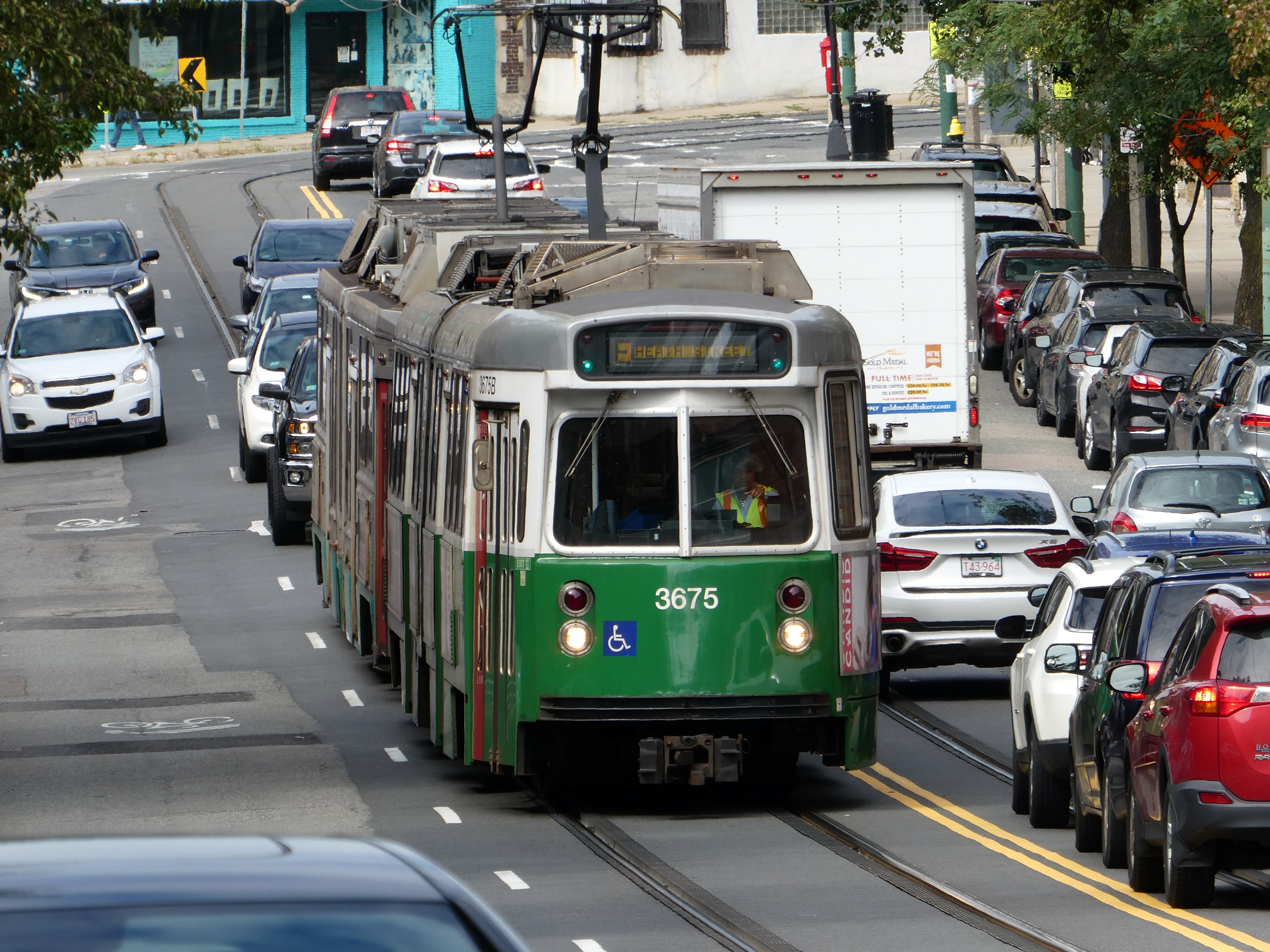
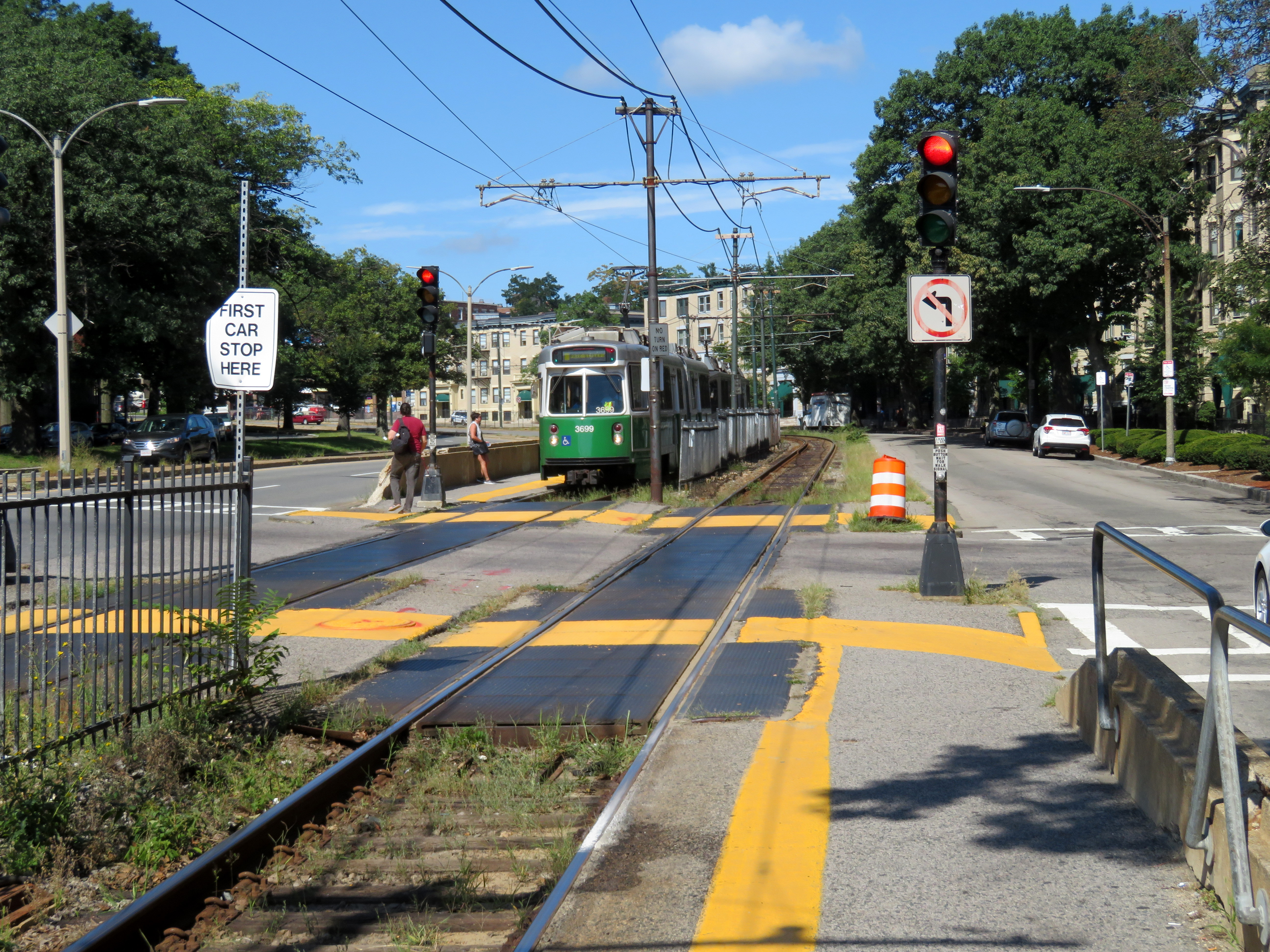
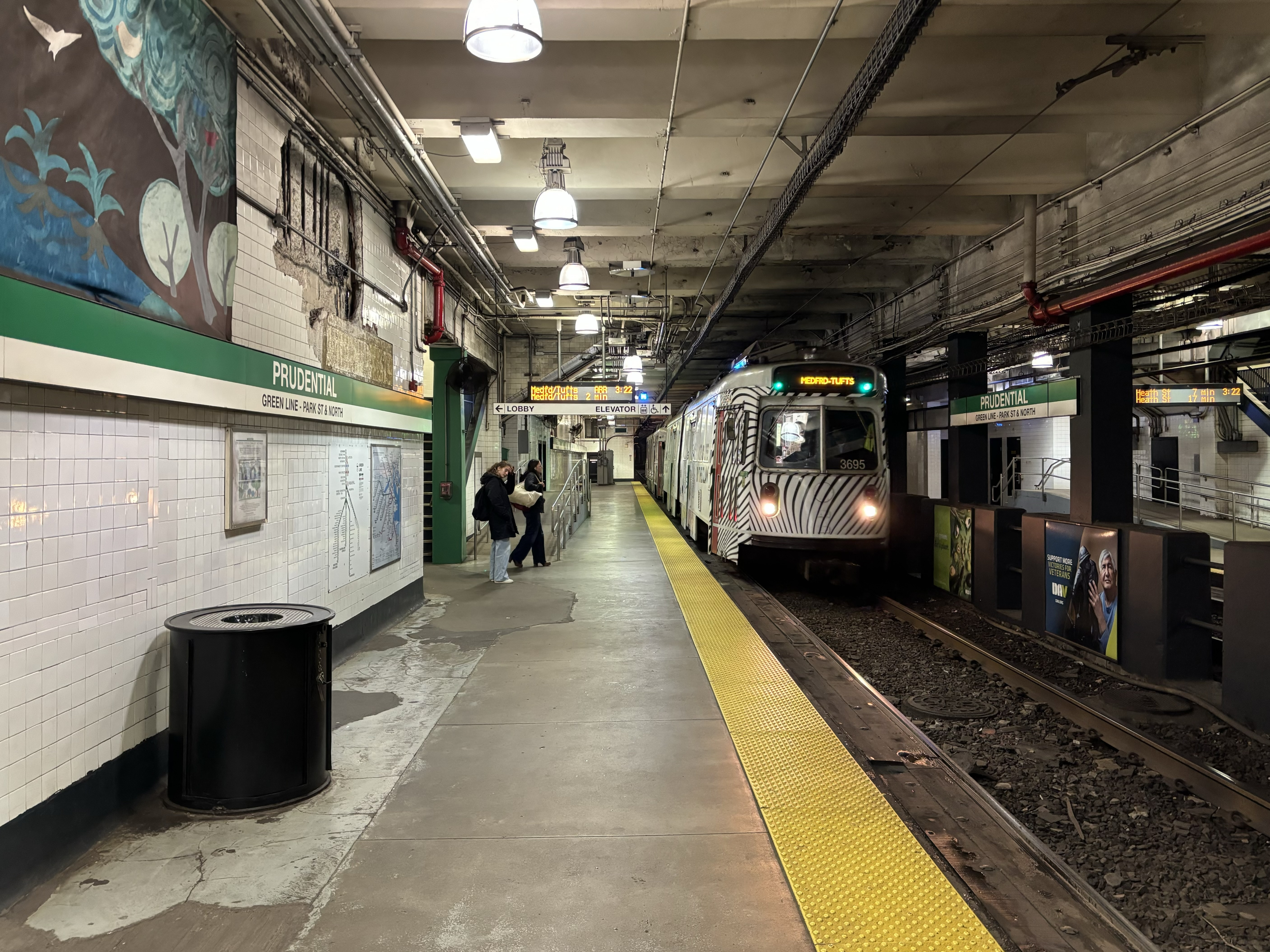
Light rail systems combine street-running or reserved tracks (category C/B, left/middle) with partially independent metro-like infrastructure (category A, right)

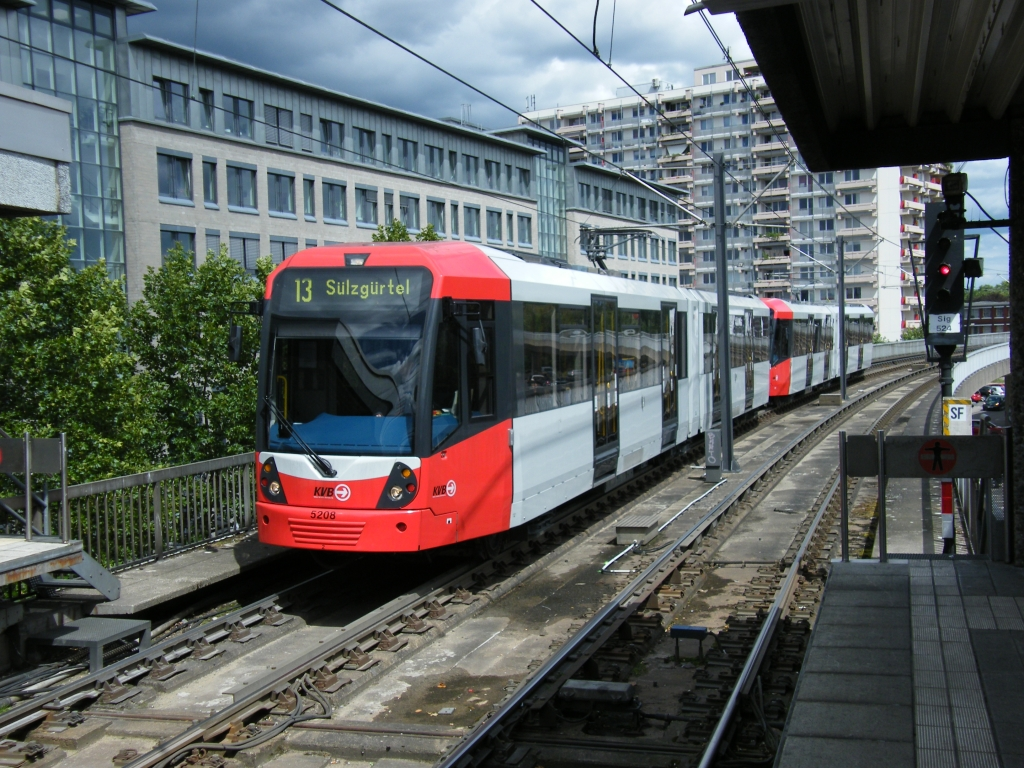
Elevated section in Cologne.

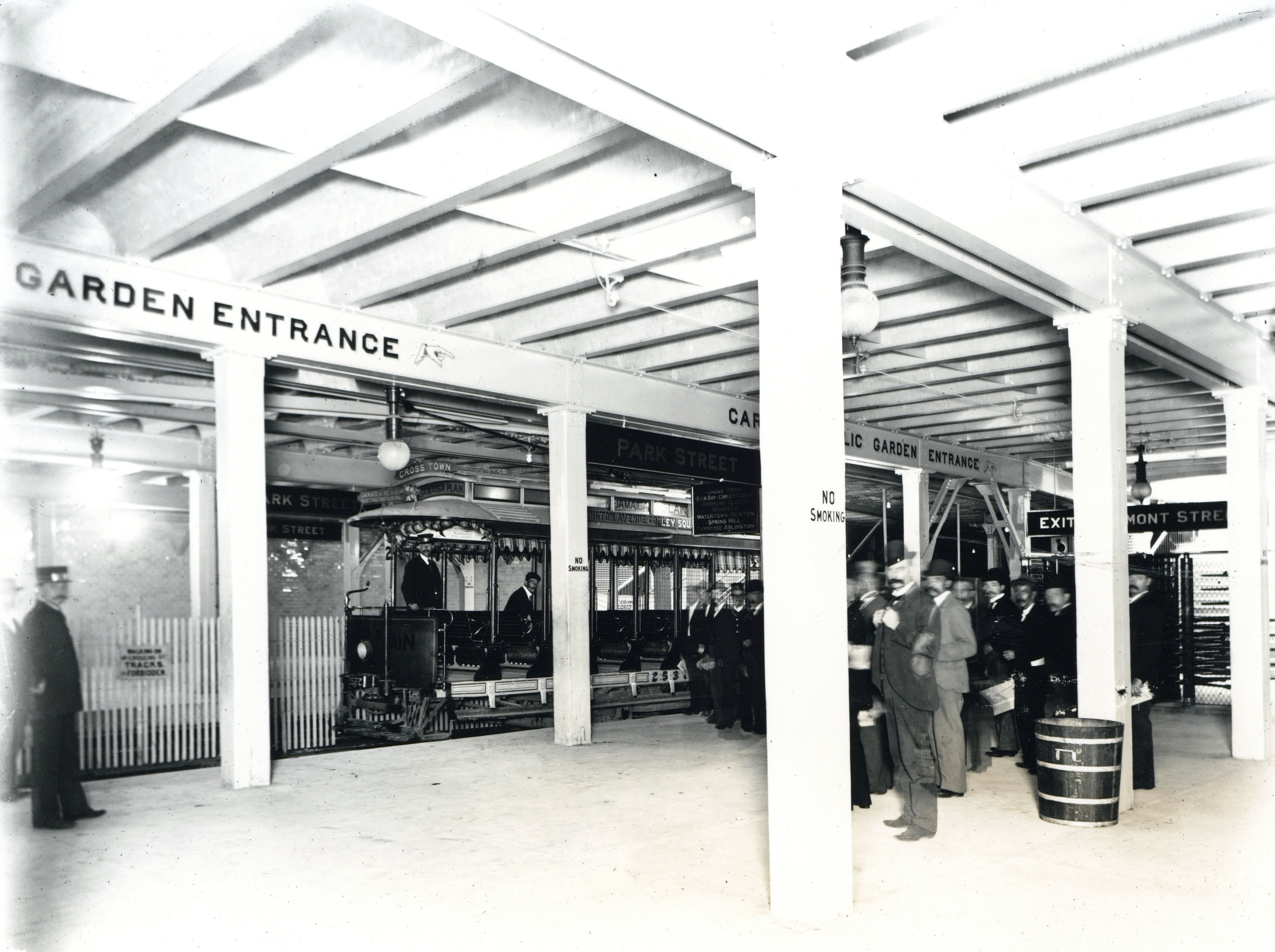
Early light rail operations in the Tremont Street subway, 1897

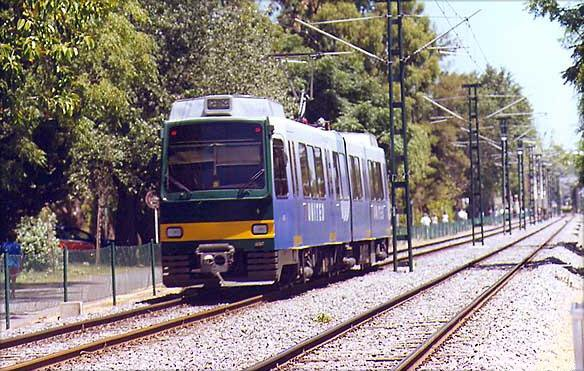
The Tren de la Costa in Greater Buenos Aires

Light rail systems can be defined by their right-of-way type and operational features such as power supply and speed. Three main categories of right-of-way can be categorized as:

- A: Fully independent tracks without road or pedestrian crossings.
- B: Reserved tracks with some level crossings.
- C: Street-running lines in mixed traffic.

Conventional tram lines typically operate on category C, light rail commonly uses category B with some sections of category A, while rapid transit generally operates entirely on category A.

Grade-separated tracks correspond to fully independent right-of-way, while reserved tracks can be exclusive or semi-exclusive. Light rail operating entirely on independent tracks is sometimes also referred to as light rail rapid transit. Dedicated stretches of track may designed to function similarly to regular metro or rapid transit lines. One key difference from rapid transit is that light rail lines may only have one or a few sections in tunnels and on viaducts.

==== Track gauge ====
Light rail systems historically used various gauges, with narrow gauge common early on. Most modern systems use standard gauge, which allows standard maintenance equipment, easier transfer of rolling stock, tighter turns with articulated cars, and better low-floor accessibility. For example, the Tren de la Costa in Greater Buenos Aires was converted from broad to standard gauge to accommodate light rail vehicles.

=== Power sources ===
Most light rail systems use overhead lines for electricity, avoiding hazards from an electrified third rail. Some systems use battery power for sections of track without overhead catenary, while a few light rail systems use diesel power.

==== Ground-level power supply ====
Conduit power was an early alternative to overhead wires in cities prohibiting them, used in London, Paris, Berlin, Marseille, Budapest, Prague, New York City, and Washington, D.C.

In Bordeaux, the tram network uses a ground-level third rail in the city center, segmented and powered only under trams to ensure safety. Outside the center, trams use overhead wires. The system is three times more expensive than conventional overhead wiring and has high maintenance costs but has proven popular, carrying up to 190,000 passengers per day. Sydney, Australia uses a similar system on the two of its lines.

=== Signalling ===
==== Automatic train operation ====
Automatic train operation (ATO) monitors train position and speed, adjusting movements for safety and efficient operations, and is used in some light rail networks.

== Rolling stock ==
Light rail routes are operated either with regular trams (with or without low floor) or with specially developed tramcars (light rail vehicles), such as the Stadtbahn-car 'type B'. Many light rail systems (including in the United States), are operated with larger and heavier vehicles than those on streetcar systems.

=== Comparisons of rolling stock types ===
Type	Rapid transit (heavy rail)*	Light rail	Tram, or streetcar	Heritage streetcar
Manufacturer	Rohr	Siemens	Skoda	Gomaco Trolley Co.
Model	BART A-Car	S70	10T	Replica Birney
Width	3.2 m (10 ft 6 in)	2.7 m (8 ft 10 1/4 in)	2.6 m (8 ft 6 3/8 in)	2.62 m (8 ft 7 1/8 in)
Length	22.9 m (75 ft 1 5/8 in)	27.7 m (90 ft 10 1/2 in) articulated	20.13 m (66 ft 1/2 in) articulated	15.16 m (49 ft 8 7/8 in)
Weight (empty)	63.1 t	48.6 t	28.8 t	23.5 t
Capacity	150 max.	72 seats, 220 max.	30 seats, 157 max.	40 seats, 50 max.
Top speed	125 km/h (77.7 mph)	106 km/h (65.9 mph)	70 km/h (43.5 mph)	48 km/h (29.8 mph)
Typical consist	4–10 vehicles	2–5 vehicles	1 vehicle	1 vehicle

The BART railcar in the chart is not generally considered to be a "light rail" vehicle (it is a heavy rail vehicle), and is only included for comparison purposes.

== Related types of rail transit ==
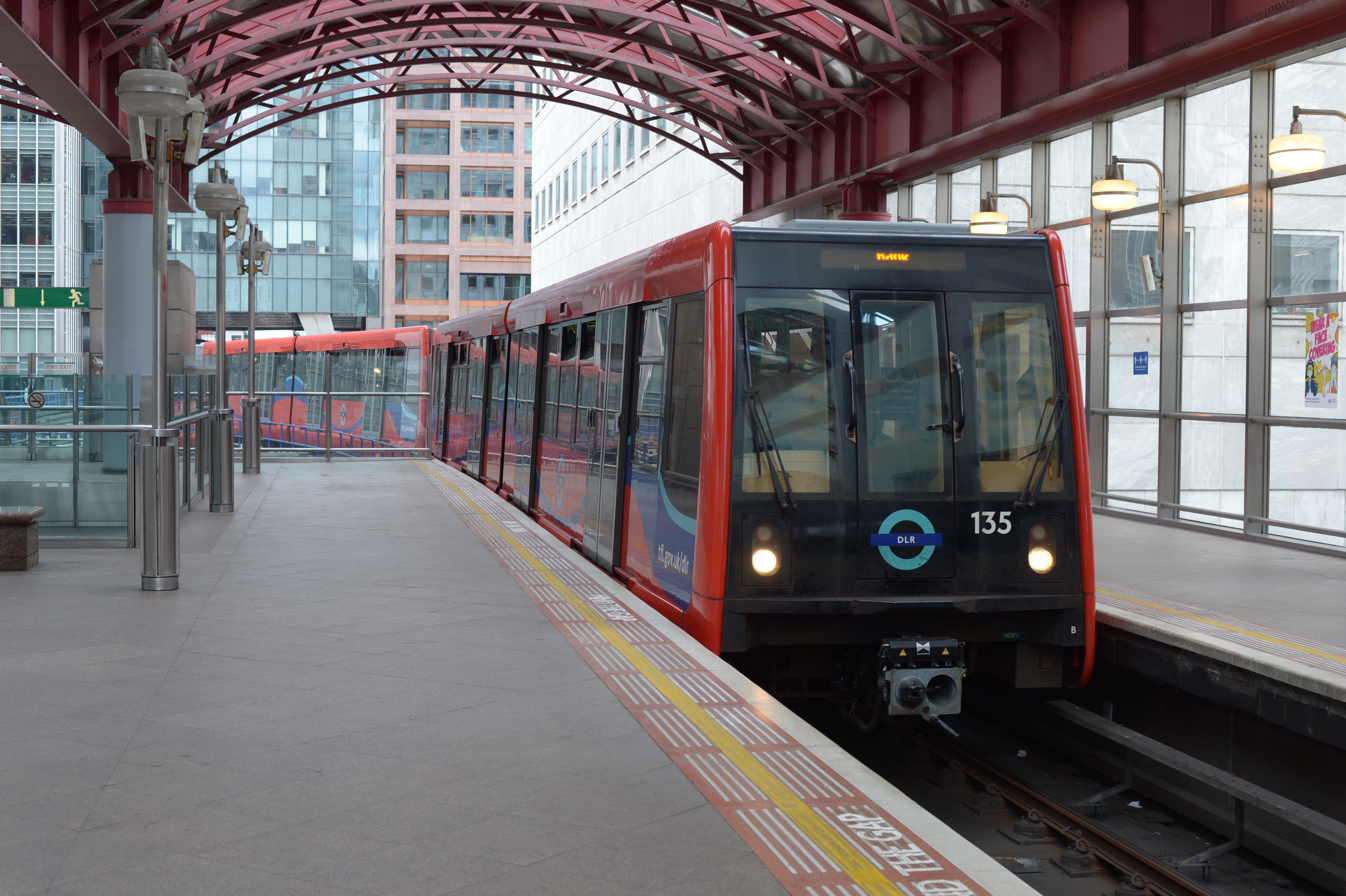
The Docklands Light Railway, a light metro system

=== Premetro ===
Premetro is largely equal to light rail: a type of public transport in which trams run partly grade separated, by using tunnels and/or viaducts. However, there is one clear distinguishing factor: premetro uses infrastructure that has been explicitly constructed with the ambition to transfer to use metro trains in the future. It is usually also developed from an existing classic tram network. One prominent example is the premetro in Brussels, where several premetro lines have been or will be converted into full heavy rail metro lines.

=== U-Stadtbahn ===
The U-Stadtbahn is also an intermediate transportation form between metro and tram. It has originated in Germany, adapting the existing tram networks. Here specially developed trams run underground through tunnels in central urban areas. Stadtbahn lines can be subdivided by looking at the types of rolling stock.

- There are lines where full-sized (i.e. 2.65 m (8 ft 8 in) wide) express trams run, with long wagon bodies: Cologne, Frankfurt and Stuttgart, among others.
- In some networks, narrower Stadtbahn trams with shorter wagon bodies were used at the start of the operation: Hannover (TW6000) and Bielefeld (Düwag M/N).
- From the end of the 20th century Stadtbahn lines with low-floor trams also appeared: Dortmund (U43 & U44), Düsseldorf (Wehrhahnlinie) and Cologne (1, 7, 9, 12 and 15).

=== Light metro ===
Some systems, such as the AirTrain JFK in New York City, the DLR in London, and Kelana Jaya Line in Kuala Lumpur, have dispensed with the need for an operator. The Vancouver SkyTrain was an early adopter of driverless vehicles, while the Toronto Scarborough rapid transit operated the same trains as Vancouver, but used drivers. In most discussions and comparisons, these specialized systems are generally not considered light rail but as light metro systems. Light metro systems are essentially hybrids of light rail and rapid transit.

=== Hybrid rail ===
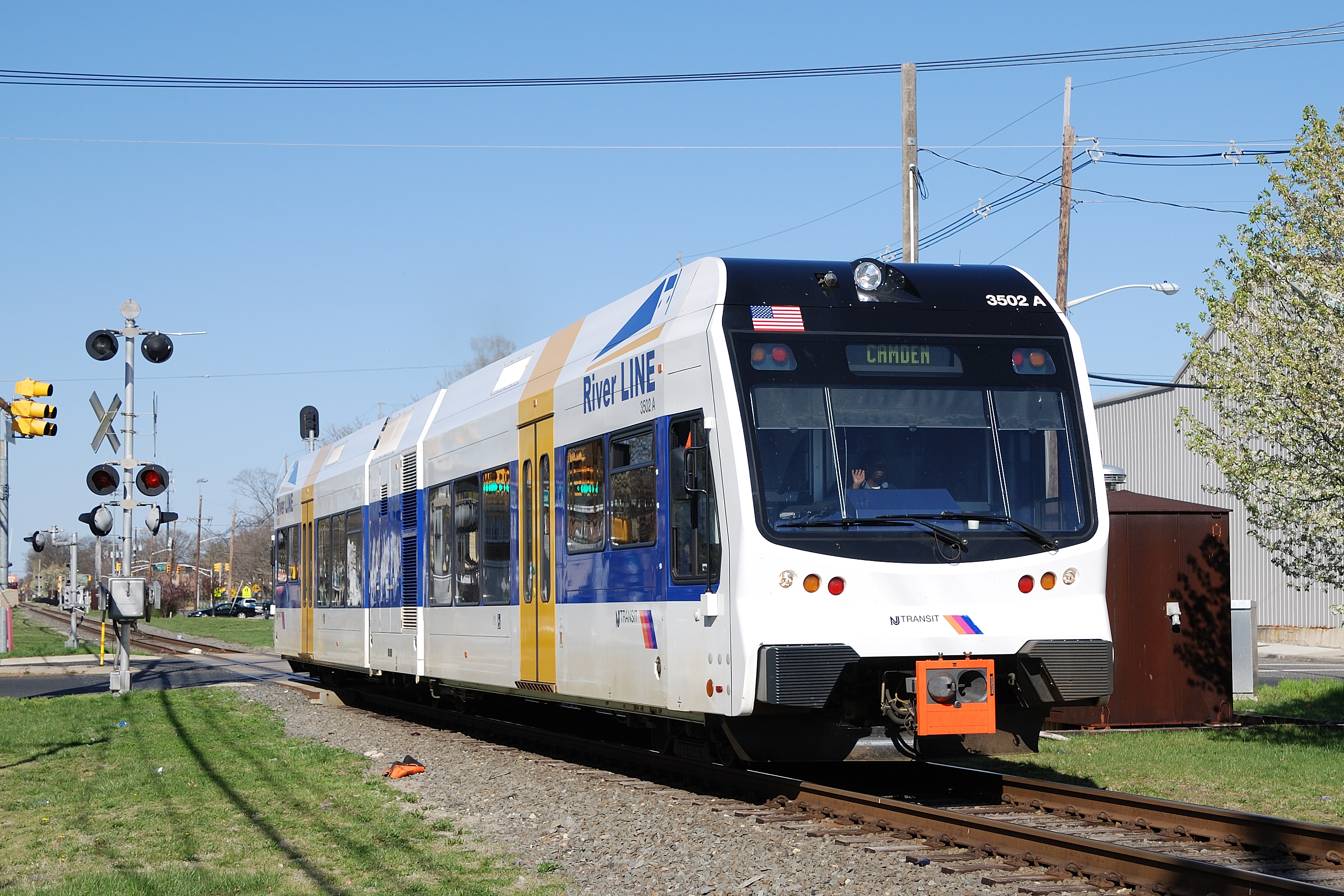
NJ Transit's River Line was the first hybrid rail service in the United States.

In the United States, interurban-style services are now rare, largely because the Federal Railroad Administration (FRA) does not permit non-compliant railcars (such as rapid transit or light rail vehicles) to operate simultaneously with standard freight or passenger equipment on the same tracks for safety reasons.

Exceptions, known as hybrid rail in the United States, include NJ Transit's River Line from Camden and Trenton and the North County Transit District's (NCTD) Sprinter service in northern San Diego County, California. These services operate under FRA waivers that allow passenger trains to run during daytime hours and freight trains at night, with several hours of temporal separation between the two. These diesel-powered systems use lightweight diesel multiple units (DMUs) originally designed for mainline railroads.

=== Very light rail ===
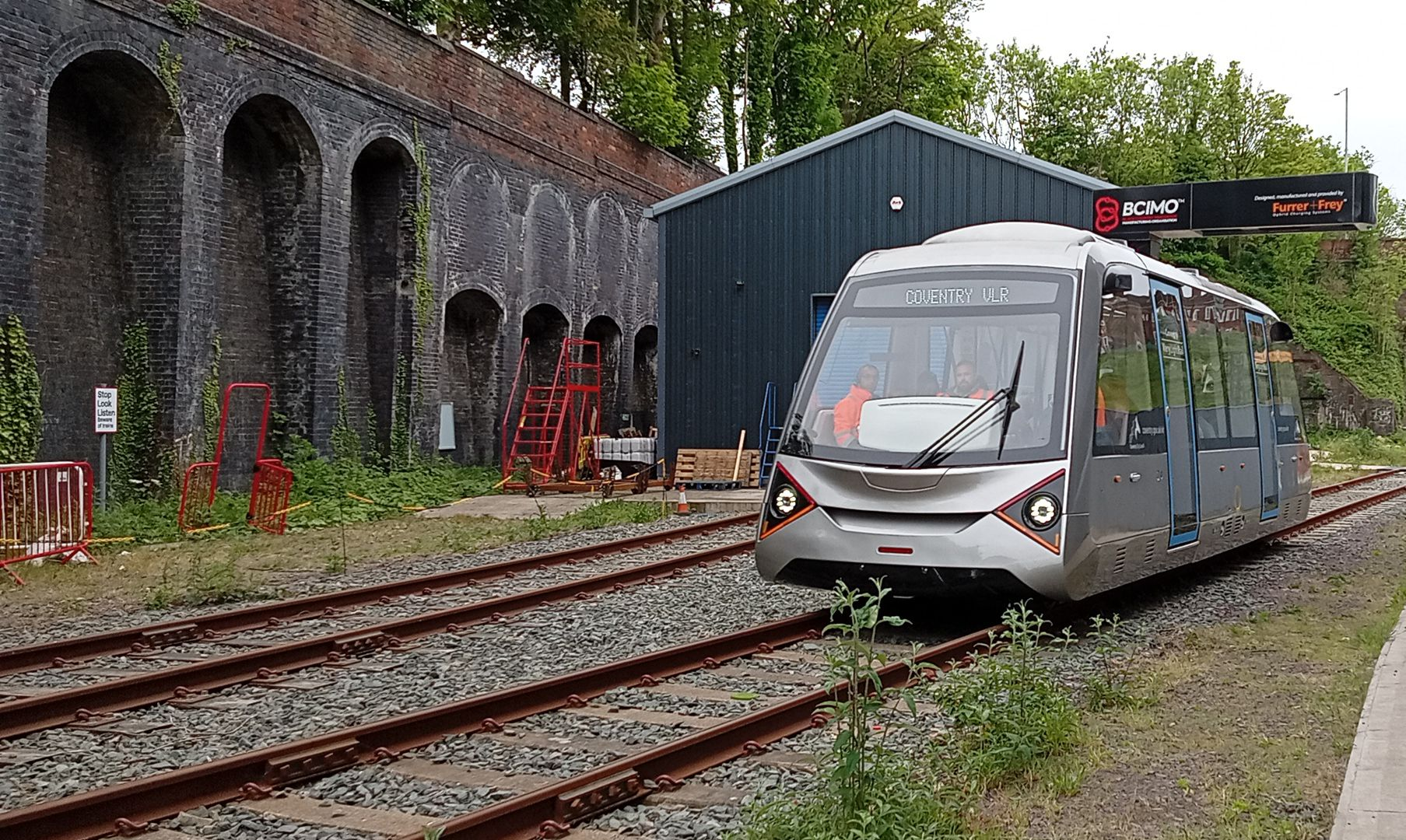
A Coventry Very Light Rail Vehicle

While the word light in "light rail" refers to the lighter capacity compared to heavy rail/rapid transit, however the same word refers to lightweight in "very light rail'. One example in passengers service is British Rail Class 139 on the Stourbridge Town branch line.

Very Light Rail developments with prefabricated track and onboard power (no Over Head Line) in the UK are aiming for £10 m per km as opposed to convention tram rail and OHL at £20–£30 m per km. First tests in Coventry have started in 2025, a full line should be operation able by 2027.

=== Comparison to other rail transit modes ===
With its mix of right-of-way types and train control technologies, LRT is the most flexible with regards to design, engineering, and operating practices. The challenge in designing light rail systems is to realize the potential of LRT to provide fast and comfortable service while avoiding the tendency to overdesign that results in excessive capital costs beyond what is necessary to meet the public's needs.

Alternative	Differences
Rapid transit	Rapid rail transit (RRT) trains are larger and faster than light rail trains, with stops being further apart. Light rail vehicles (LRVs) are distinguished from RRT vehicles by their capability for operation in mixed traffic, generally resulting in a narrower car body and articulation to operate in a street traffic environment. With their large size, large turning radius, and often an electrified third rail, RRT vehicles cannot operate in the street. Since LRT systems can operate in existing streets, they can often avoid the cost of expensive grade-separated subway and elevated segments that would be required with RRT.
Streetcars or trams	Conversely, LRVs generally outperform traditional streetcars in terms of capacity and top-end speed, and almost all modern LRVs are capable of multiple-unit operation. The latest generation of LRVs is considerably larger and faster, typically 29 m (95 ft 1 3/4 in) long with a maximum speed of around 105 km/h (65.2 mph).
Heritage streetcars	A variation considered by many cities is to use historic or replica cars on their streetcar systems instead of modern LRVs. A heritage streetcar may not have the capacity and speed of an LRV, but it will add to the ambiance and historic character of its location.
Light metro	A derivative of LRT is light rail rapid transit (LRRT), also referred to as light metro. Such railroads are characterized by exclusive rights of way, advanced train control systems, short headway capability, and floor-level boarding. These systems approach the passenger capacity of full metro systems but can be cheaper to construct due to LRVs generally being smaller in size, turning tighter curves and climbing steeper grades than standard RRT vehicles, and having a smaller station size.
Interurbans	The term interurban mainly refers to rail cars that run through streets like ordinary streetcars (trams), but also between cities or towns, often through rural environments. In the period 1900–1930, interurbans were very common in the US, especially in the Midwest. Some of them, like the Red Devils, the J. G. Brill Bullets, and the Electroliners, were the high-speed railcars of their time, with an in-service speed of up to about 145 km/h (90 mph). In Europe, interurbans are making a comeback as "tram-trains" (locally known under different names) that operate on both the railroad and light rail tracks, often with different voltages. The Karlsruhe Stadtbahn is one well-known example.

== Capacity ==
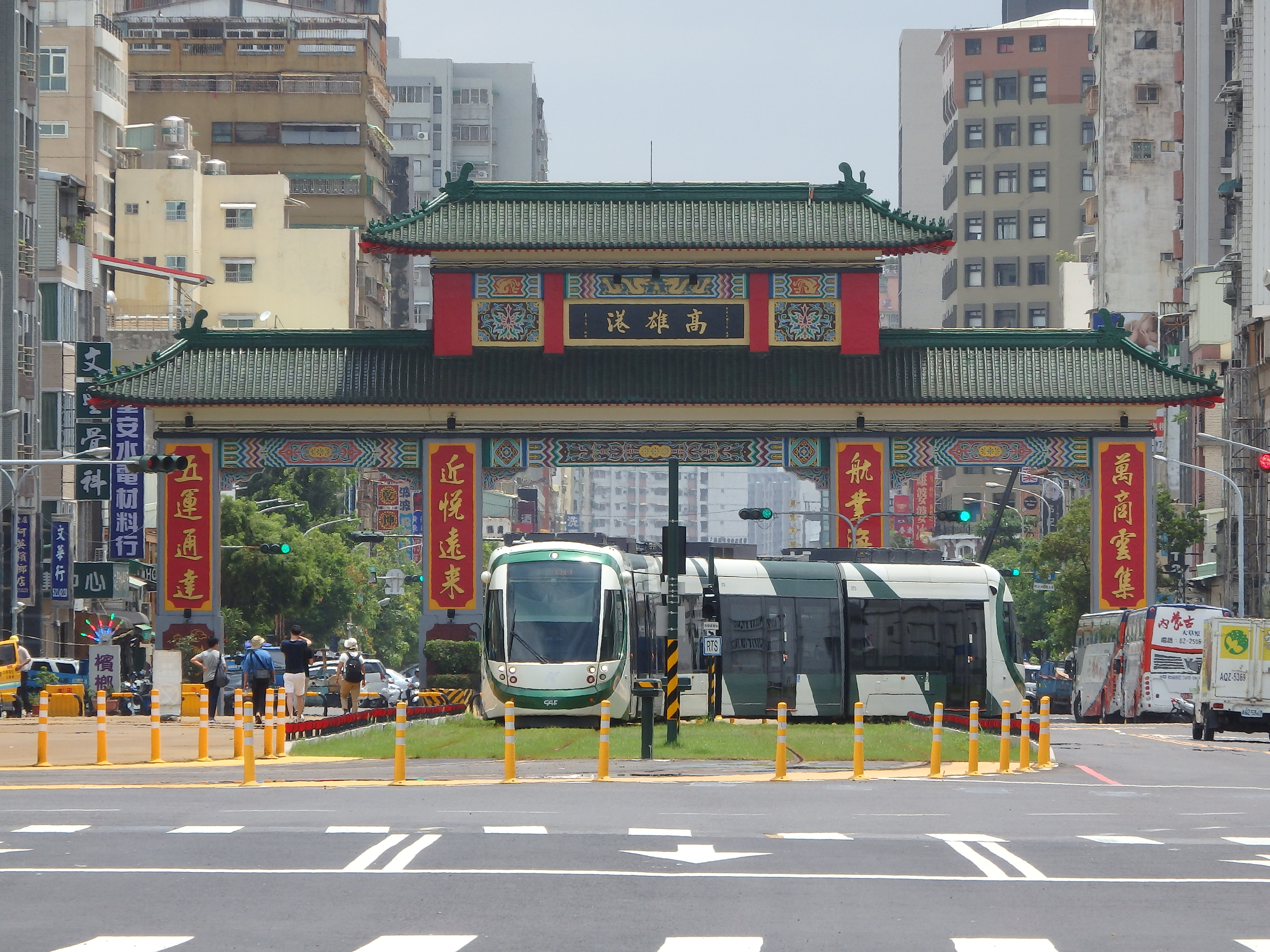
Circular light rail in front of the Gate of Kaohsiung, Taiwan

=== Comparison with high-capacity roads ===
A single light rail line (requiring a 7.6 m [25 ft] right-of-way) can carry up to eight times more passengers than a 3.7 m (12 ft) freeway lane during peak periods. Freeway lanes typically reach capacity at about 2,000 vehicles per hour, beyond which traffic flow breaks down and speeds collapse. With average commuter car occupancy of only 1.5 persons, freeways carry a maximum of about 3,000 passengers per lane per hour. HOV lanes and ride-sharing can improve this, but most jurisdictions expand roadway capacity instead, sometimes worsening congestion (Downs–Thomson paradox, Braess's paradox).

By contrast, light rail trains operating in two-track rights-of-way as narrow as two car lanes can exceed 20,000 passengers per hour per direction, and over 25,000 with moving block signaling.

Roadway person-throughput varies by permitted vehicle types. A typical car-only lane carries about 1,900 passenger cars per lane per hour (pcplph). Adding buses or light rail raises capacity, as shown below:

	Car	Car + bus	Car + light rail
Low volume	900	1,650	2,250
Medium volume	900	2,350	3,250
High volume	900	3,400	4,600
Source: Edson & Tennyson, 2003

=== Comparison with bus rapid transit ===
Bus rapid transit (BRT) is often compared with LRT in corridor planning. BRT in dedicated lanes can exceed 30,000 passengers per hour per direction, as in Guangzhou Bus Rapid Transit, which operates up to 350 buses per hour. Achieving this requires large stations, bus priority at intersections, and overtaking lanes for express services. BRT labor and fuel costs are typically higher, since each bus requires a driver and most use non-electrified vehicles. Ride quality is also lower, with more abrupt braking and acceleration compared to rail.

=== Practical considerations ===
Most U.S. light rail systems are demand-limited, carrying under 4,000 passengers per hour per direction, though Boston and San Francisco reach 9,600 and 13,100 respectively. Calgary's C-Train and Mexico's Metrorrey have higher ridership, while the Manila Light Rail Transit System exceeds 40,000 per hour per direction, operating four-car trains of up to 1,350 passengers at 30 trains per hour. Manila's system, however, is fully grade-separated and more comparable to a metro.

== Costs and efficiency ==
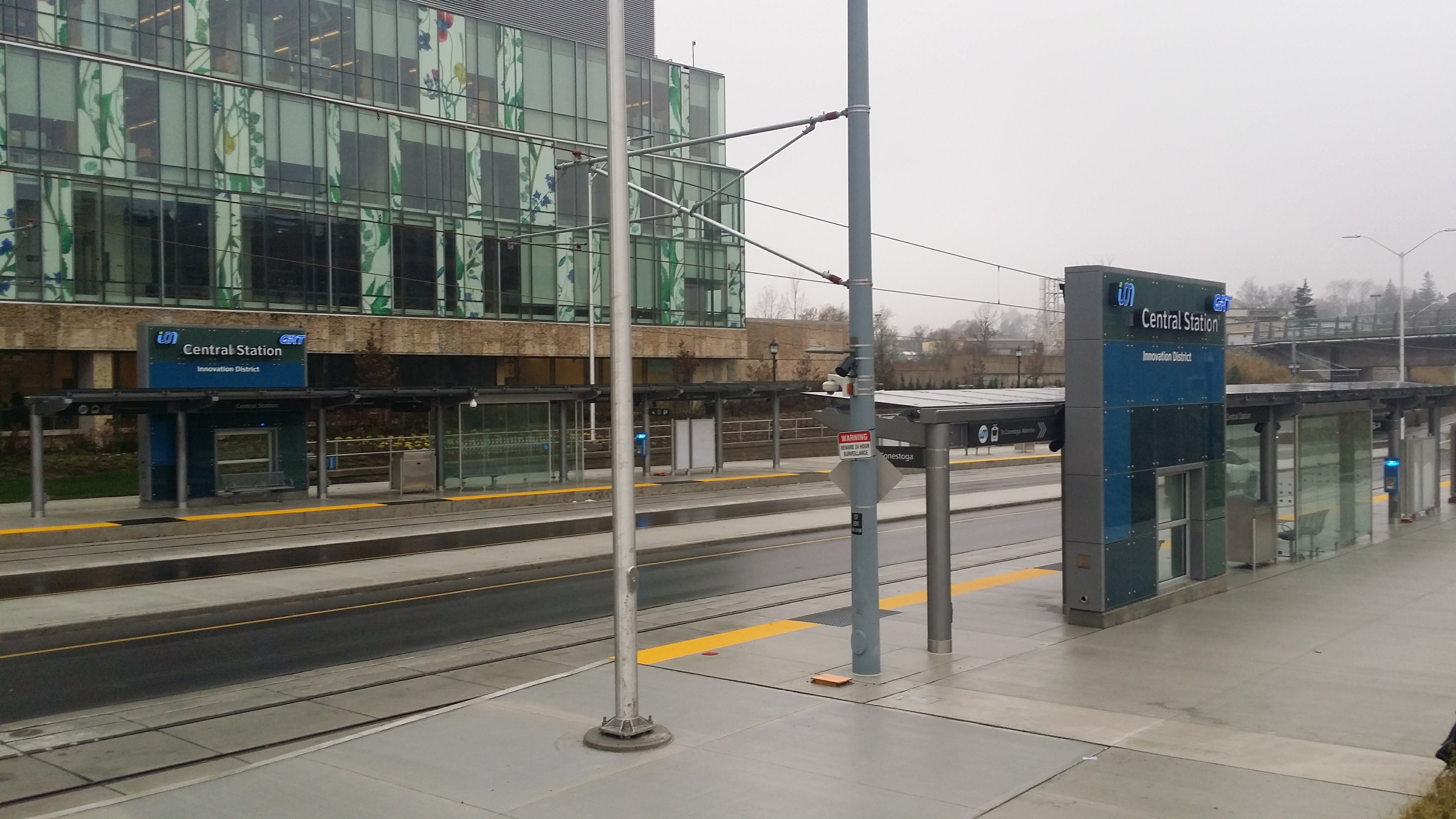
The Ion in Waterloo Region, Ontario spurred major development along its route before opening.

Light rail construction costs vary widely depending on tunneling and elevated structures. A survey of North American projects found most systems cost between $15 million and $100 million per mile, averaging $35 million (excluding Seattle). Seattle's Link Light Rail reached $179 million per mile due to tunneling, elevated sections, and deep stations, while Baltimore, Camden, Sacramento, and Salt Lake City each built systems for under $20 million per mile.

By comparison, freeway lane expansion averages $2.3 million per lane-mile, but is usually built in less costly suburban or rural areas. The most expensive U.S. road project, Boston's Big Dig, reached $200 million per lane-mile. A light rail track can carry up to 20,000 passengers per hour, compared with 2,000–2,200 vehicles per freeway lane, with Boston and San Francisco lines carrying 9,600 and 13,100 peak-hour passengers respectively.

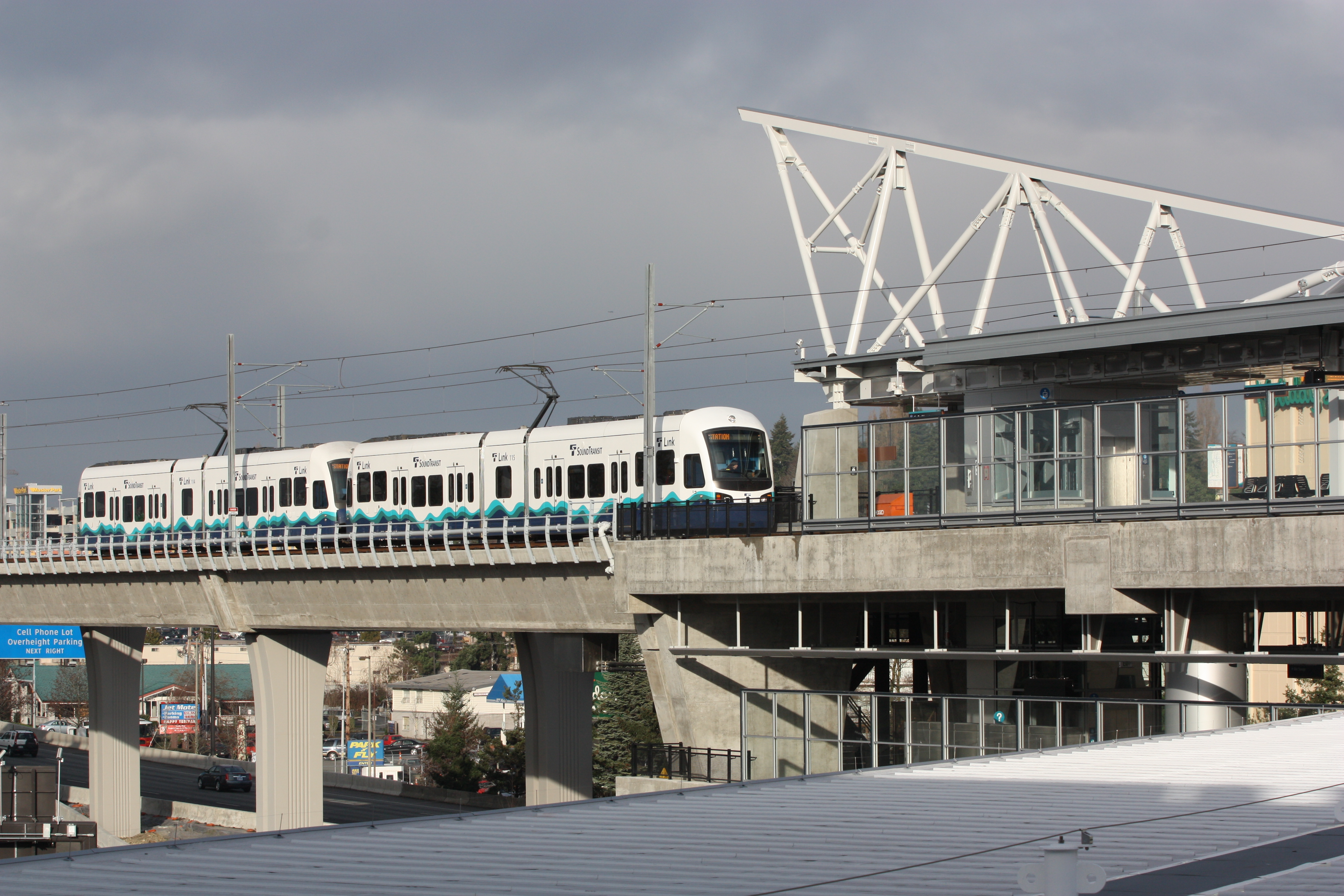
Sound Transit Airport station

Joint highway–LRT projects can lower costs, as shown by Denver's Transportation Expansion Project, which rebuilt 17 mi of highway and added 19 mi of light rail for $1.67 billion, or $19.3 million per highway lane-mile and $27.6 million per rail mile. The project finished under budget and nearly two years early.

The Calgary CTrain minimized costs by avoiding tunnels and elevated sections, using existing rail corridors, and combining construction with freeway projects. Its capital cost was $24 million per mile, about one-third that of the San Diego Trolley. By 2009, Calgary carried three times San Diego's ridership with lower capital and operating cost per passenger. Operating costs average C$163 per train-hour, or about 27 cents per ride, compared with $1.50 for buses.

Light rail often has lower labor costs per passenger mile, attracts more riders than buses, and achieves faster speeds with fewer vehicles required. Vehicles cost more upfront but last longer, reducing life-cycle costs. Compared with heavy rail, LRT has lower capital but higher operating costs.

Light rail energy efficiency is estimated at 120 passenger-miles per gallon of fuel equivalent, though performance varies with context.

== Effects ==
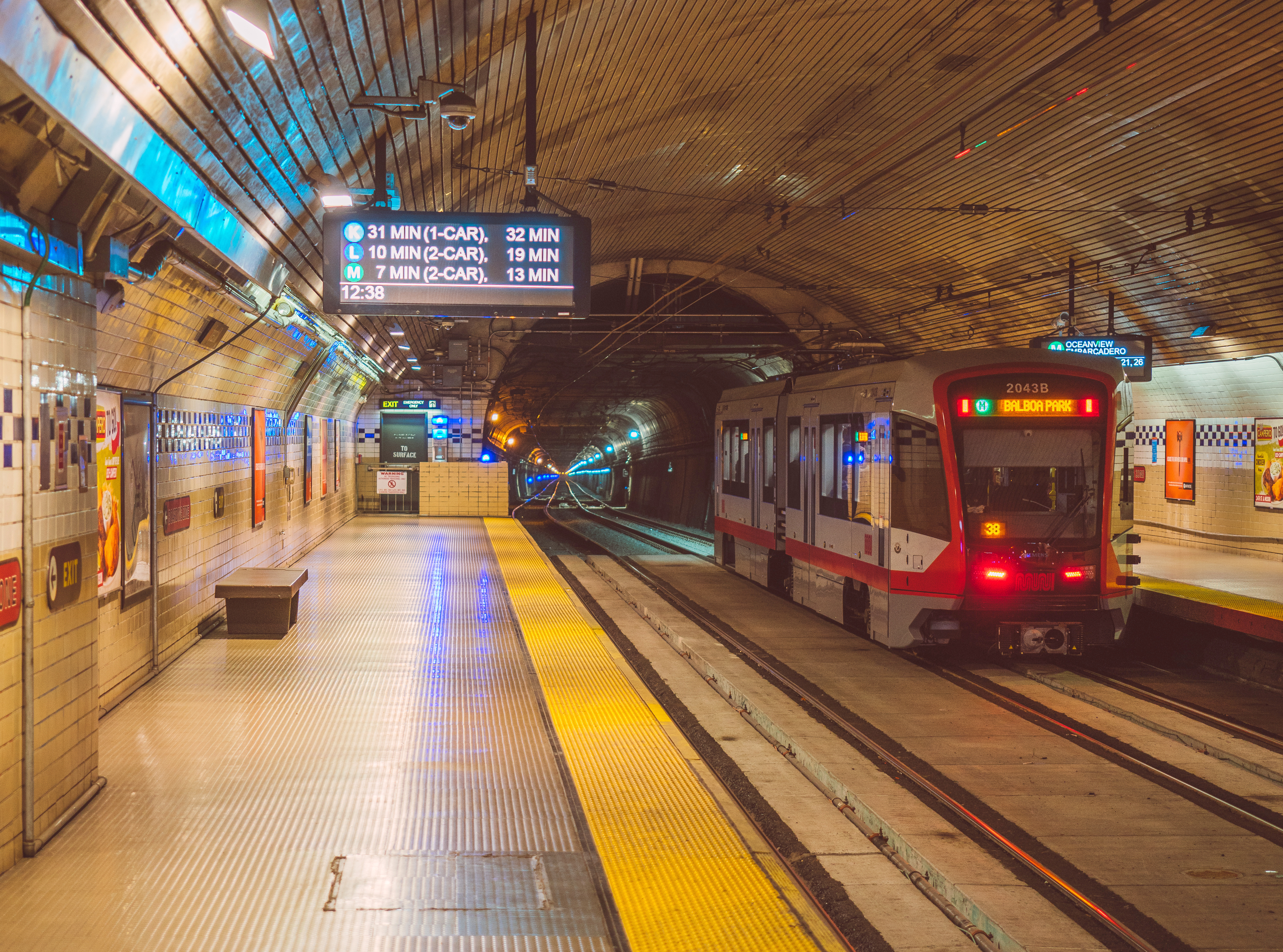
Muni Metro Forest Hill station

=== Safety ===
An analysis of data from the 505-page National Transportation Statistics report published by the US Department of Transportation shows that light rail fatalities are higher than all other forms of transportation except motorcycle travel (31.5 fatalities per 100 million miles).

However, the National Transportation Statistics report published by the US Department of Transportation states that:

Caution must be exercised in comparing fatalities across modes because significantly different definitions are used. In particular, Rail and Transit fatalities include incident-related (as distinct from accident-related) fatalities, such as fatalities from falls in transit stations or railroad employee fatalities from a fire in a workshed. Equivalent fatalities for the Air and Highway modes (fatalities at airports not caused by moving aircraft or fatalities from accidents in automobile repair shops) are not counted toward the totals for these modes. Thus, fatalities not necessarily directly related to in-service transportation are counted for the transit and rail modes, potentially overstating the risk for these modes.

=== Health impact ===
Studies have attributed light rail with a number of health impacts. Research has associated light rail positively with increased walking and decreased obesity. Additionally, one electric light rail train produces nearly 99 percent less carbon monoxide and hydrocarbon emissions per mile than one automobile does.

== Examples ==
Worldwide around 400 cities have one or more tram/light rail systems. Some date back to the 19th century, and by the 1930s almost 900 tram/light rail system existed. Many of the original tram and streetcar systems were closed down in the mid-20th century, except in most Central and Eastern European countries. Other cities that once closed down their streetcar networks are now restoring, or have already rebuilt, at least some of their former streetcar/tram systems.

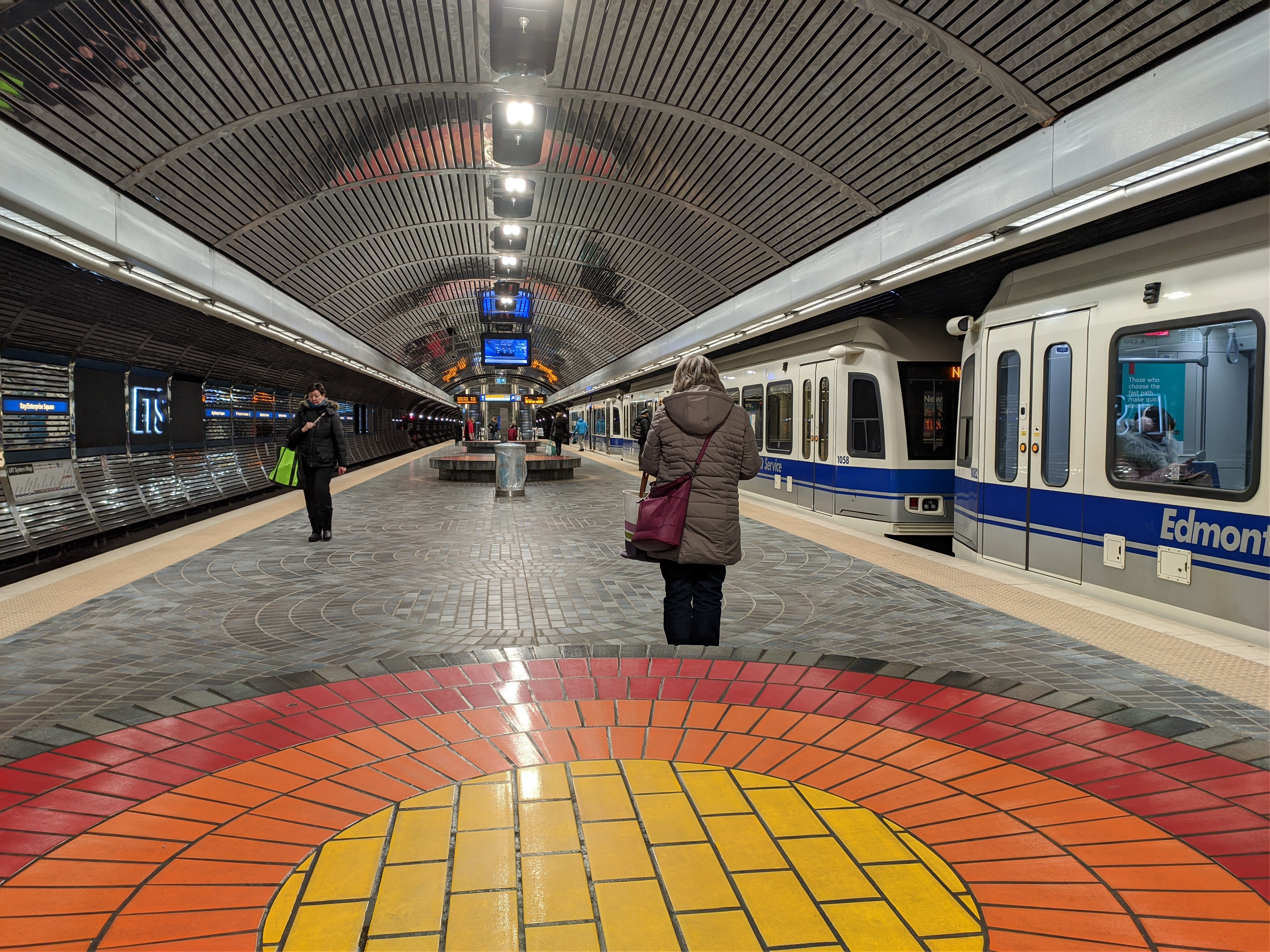
An underground light rail station in Edmonton, Canada, part of the first light rail system in North America

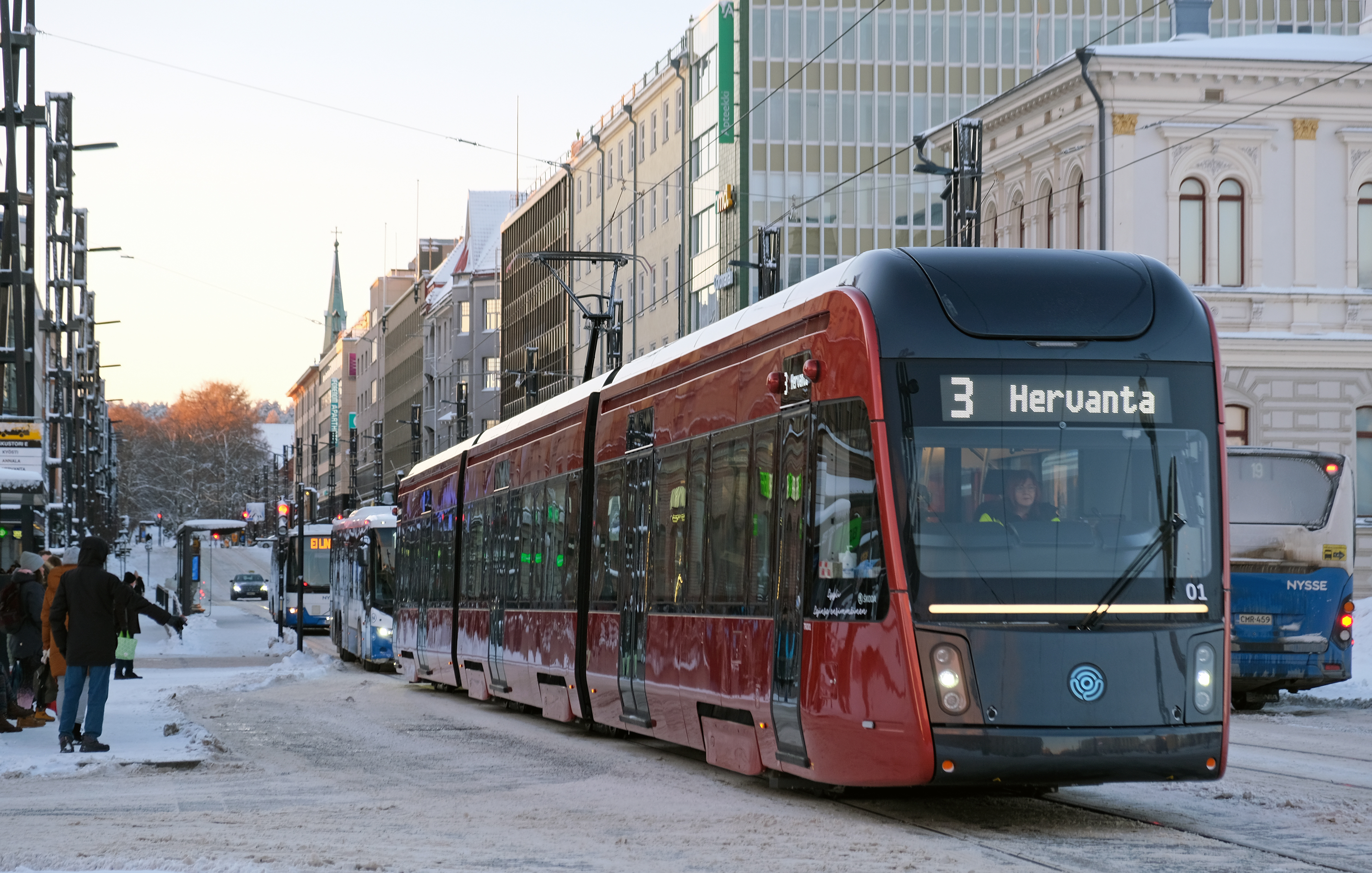
A light-rail vehicle on the Hämeenkatu street in Tampere

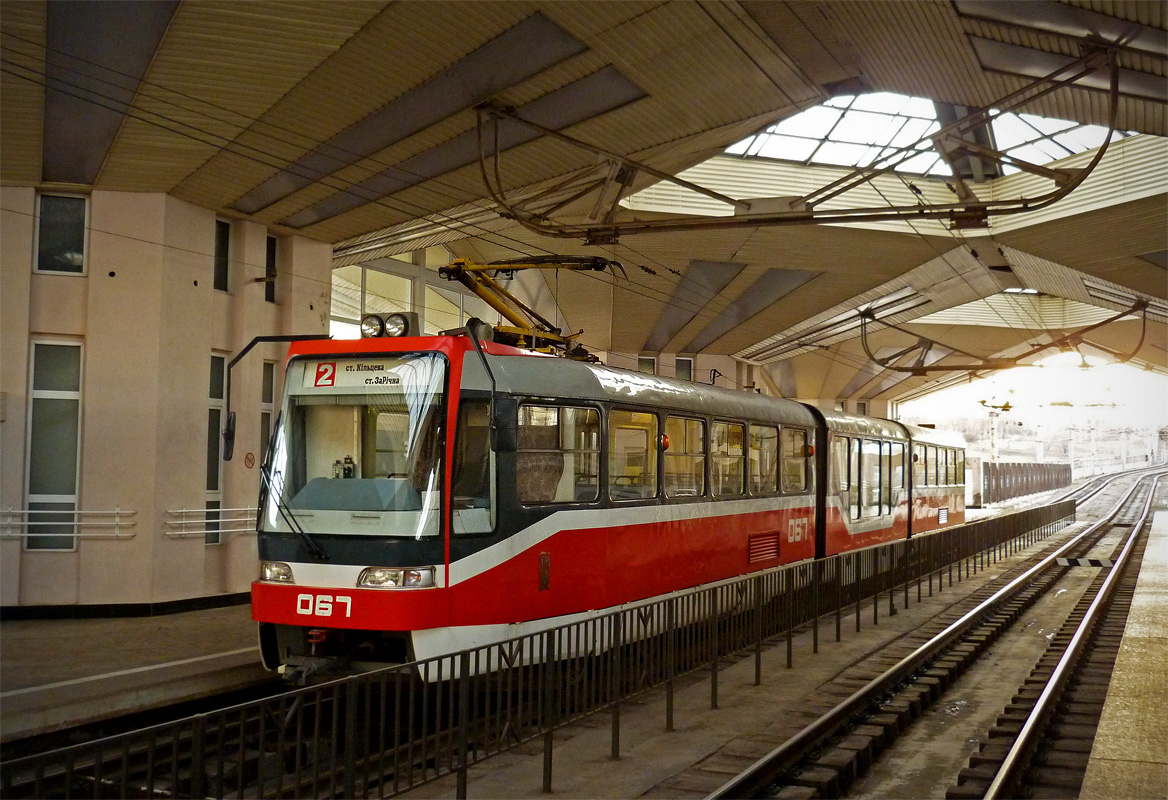
Metrotram in Kryvyi Rih (Ukraine) was separated from the streets, but later connected to the existing tram network.

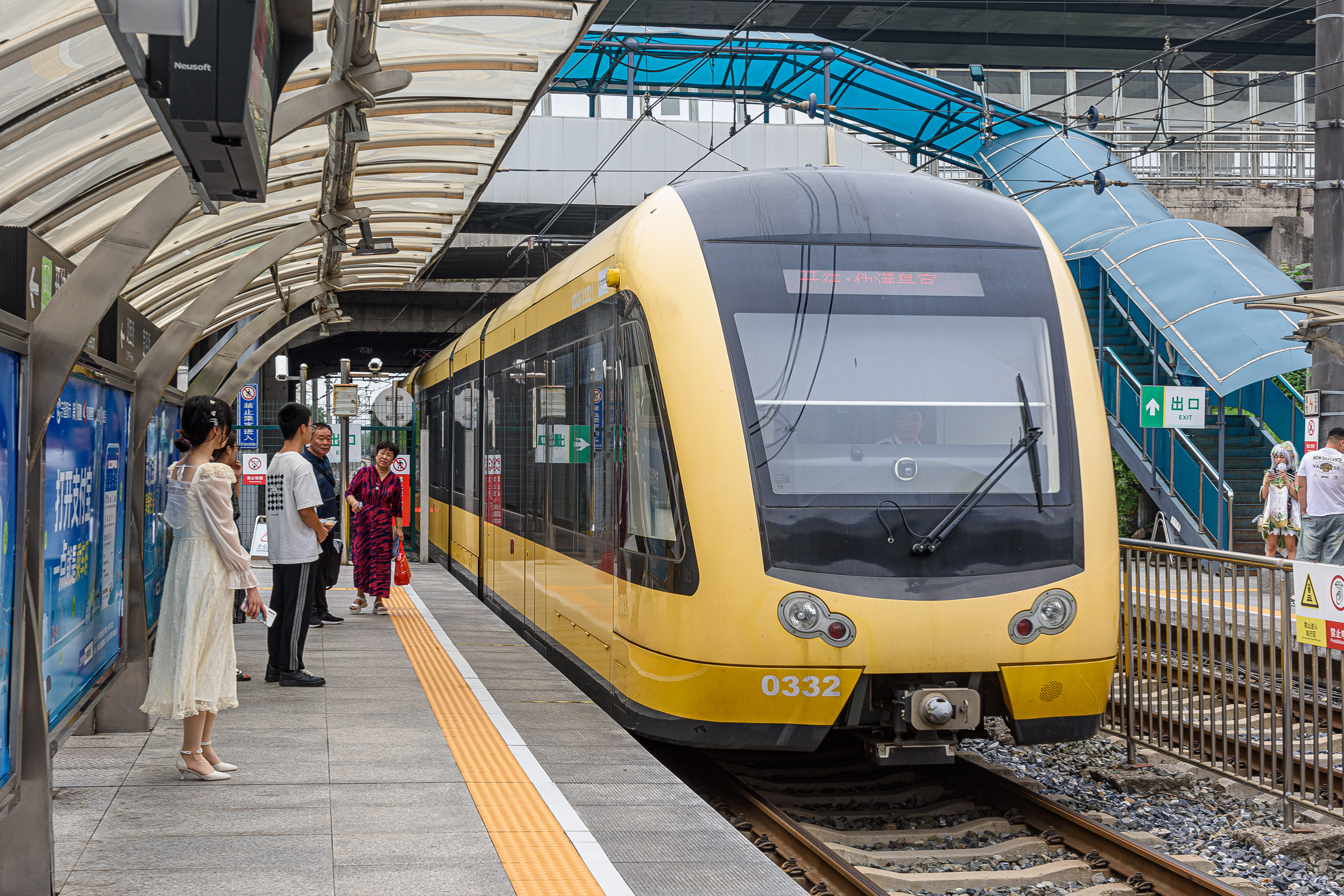
A light-rail vehicle of the Changchun Rail Transit in Changchun, China

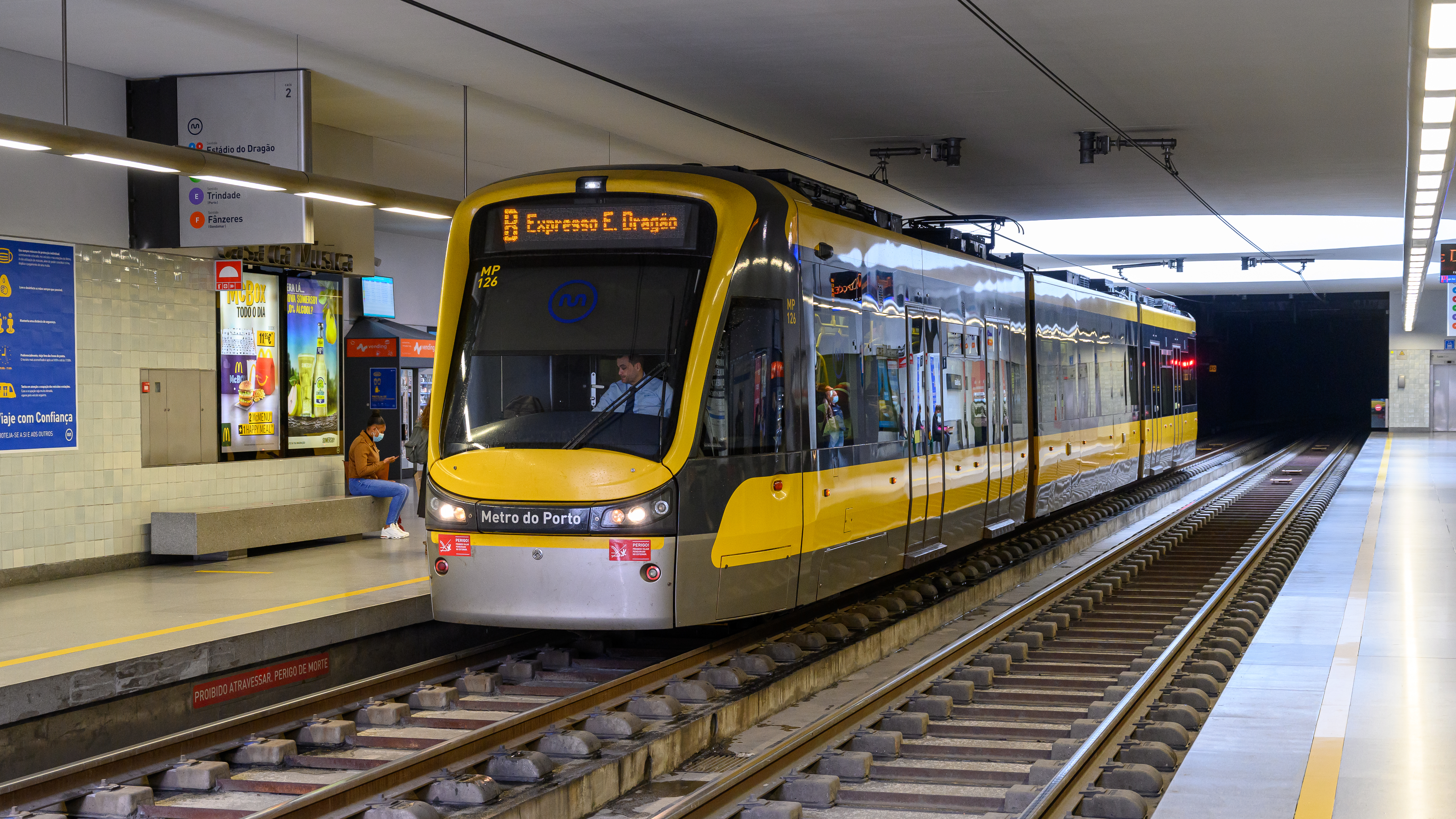
Porto metro light rail station in 2022

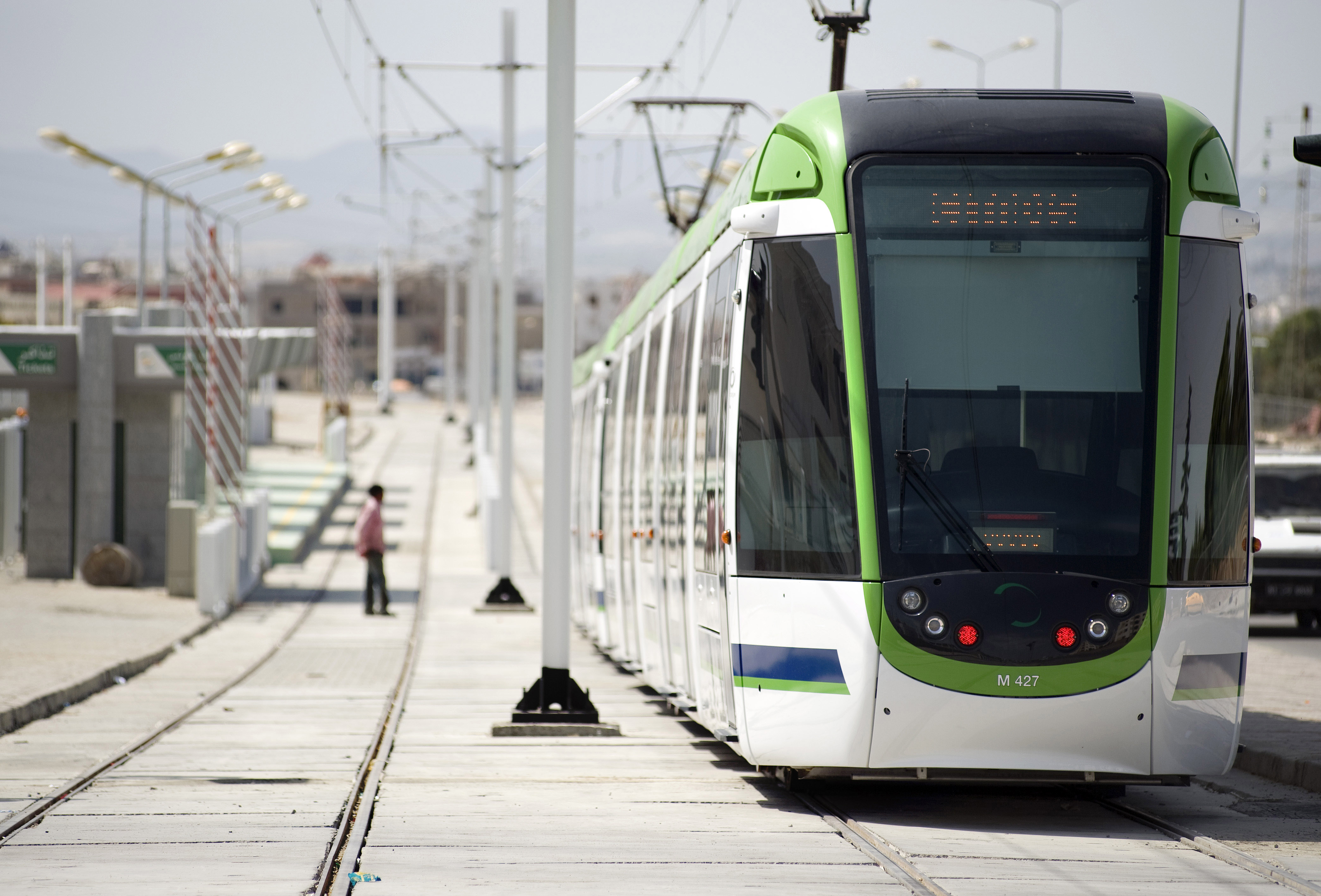
The light rail in Tunis, Tunisia, was the first light rail system in Africa

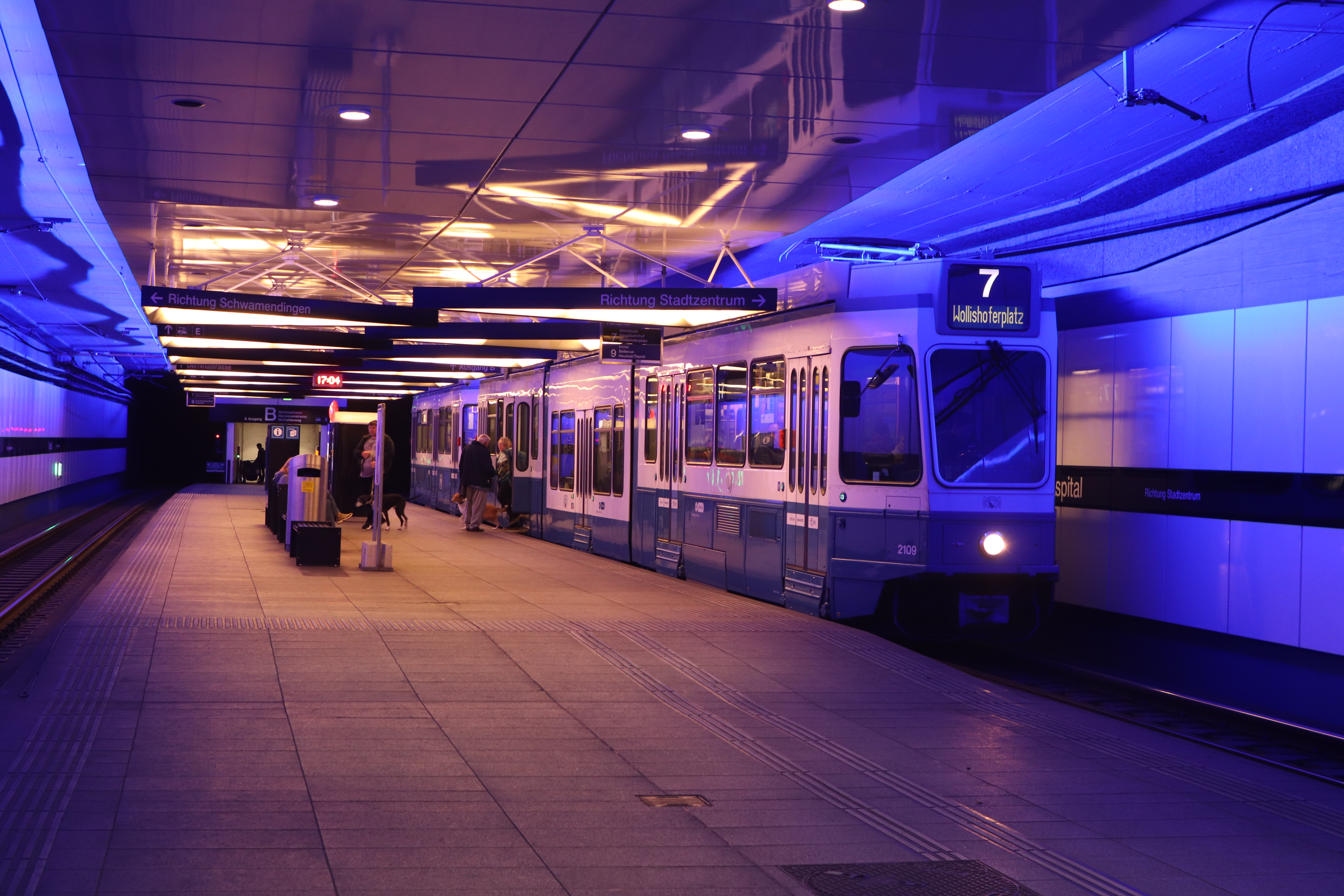
Underground light rail stop in Zurich, 2022

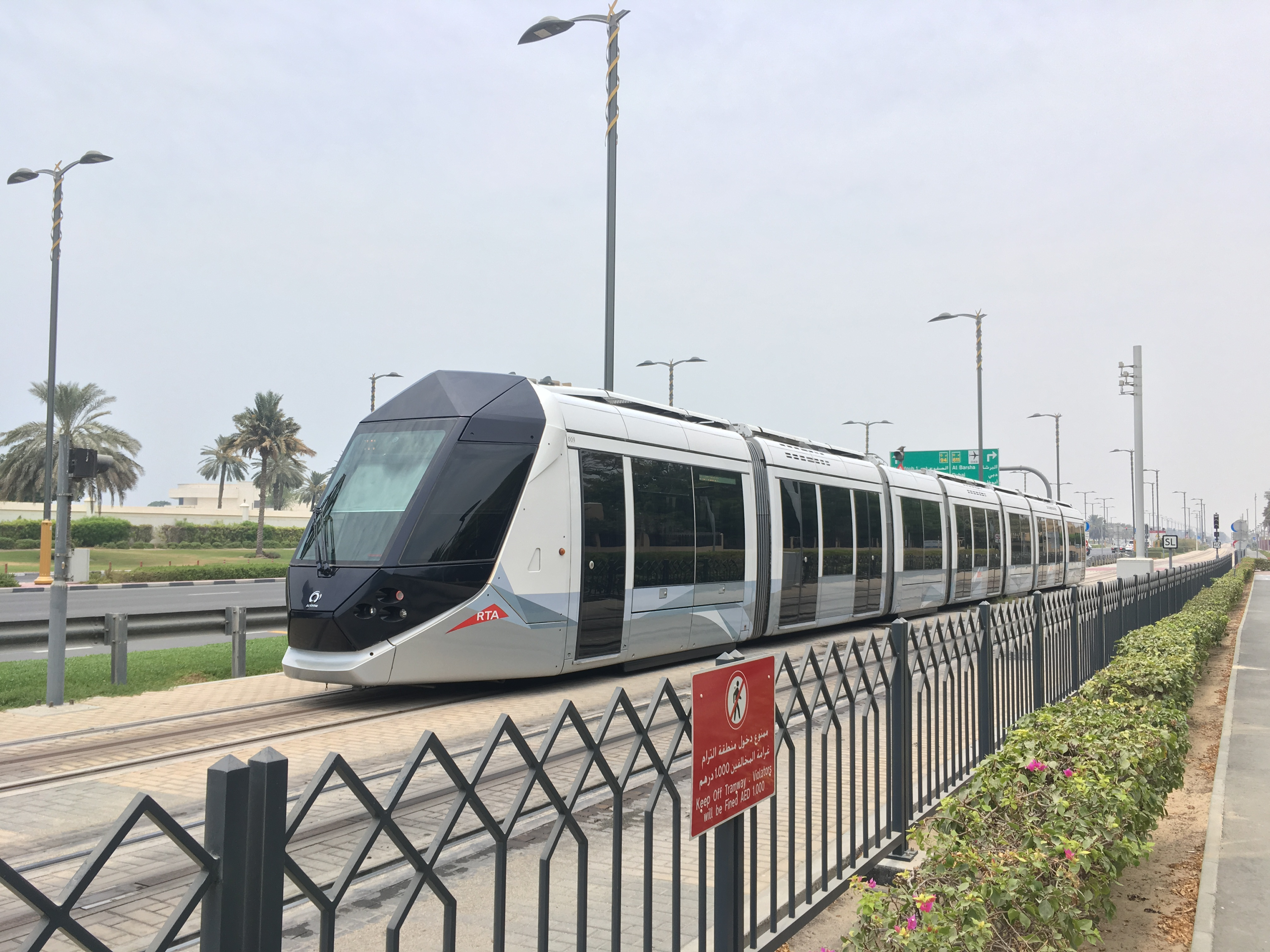
Tram in Dubai, UAE

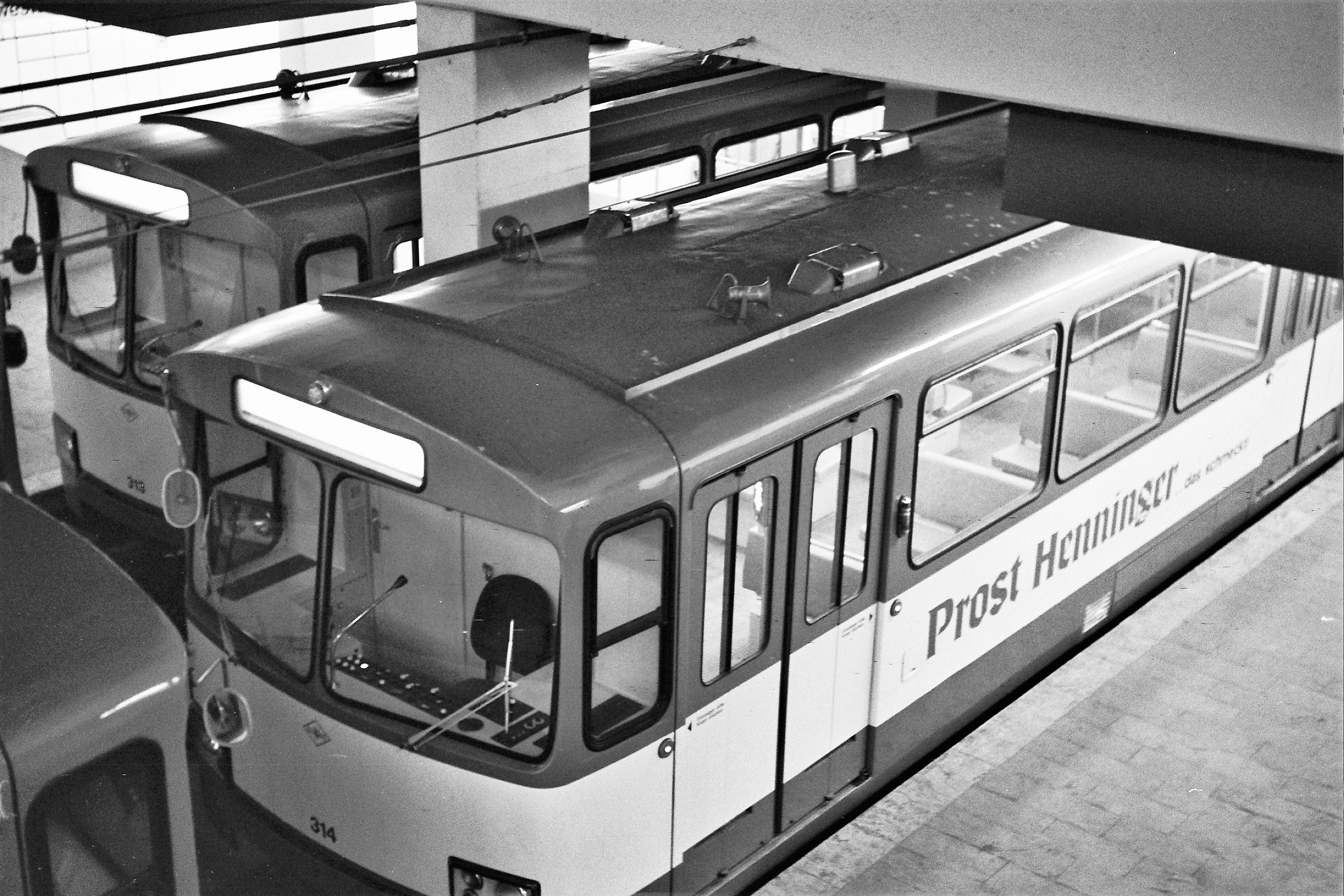
Frankfurt U-Bahn light rail station in 1970

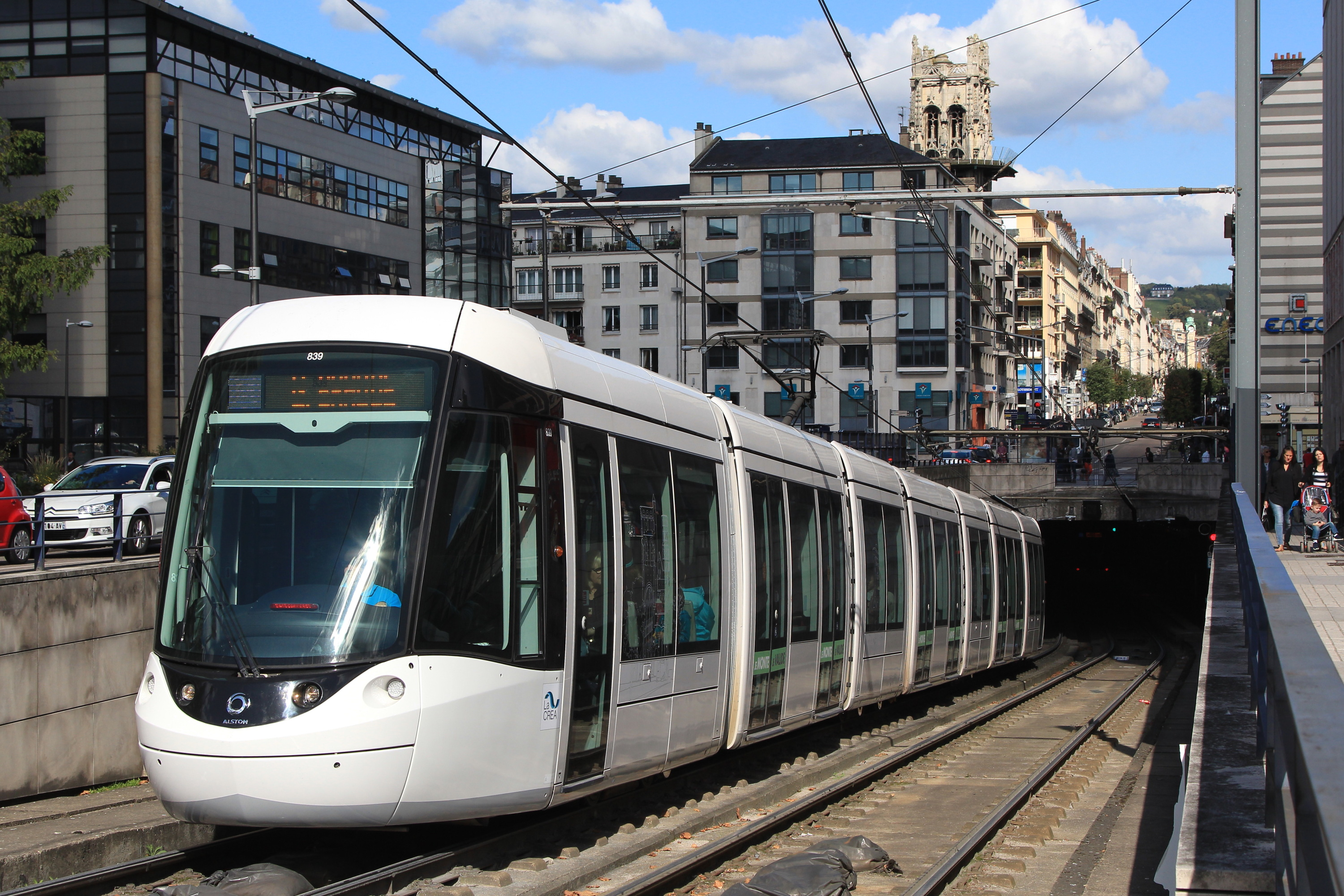
Rouen tramway subway portal in 2015

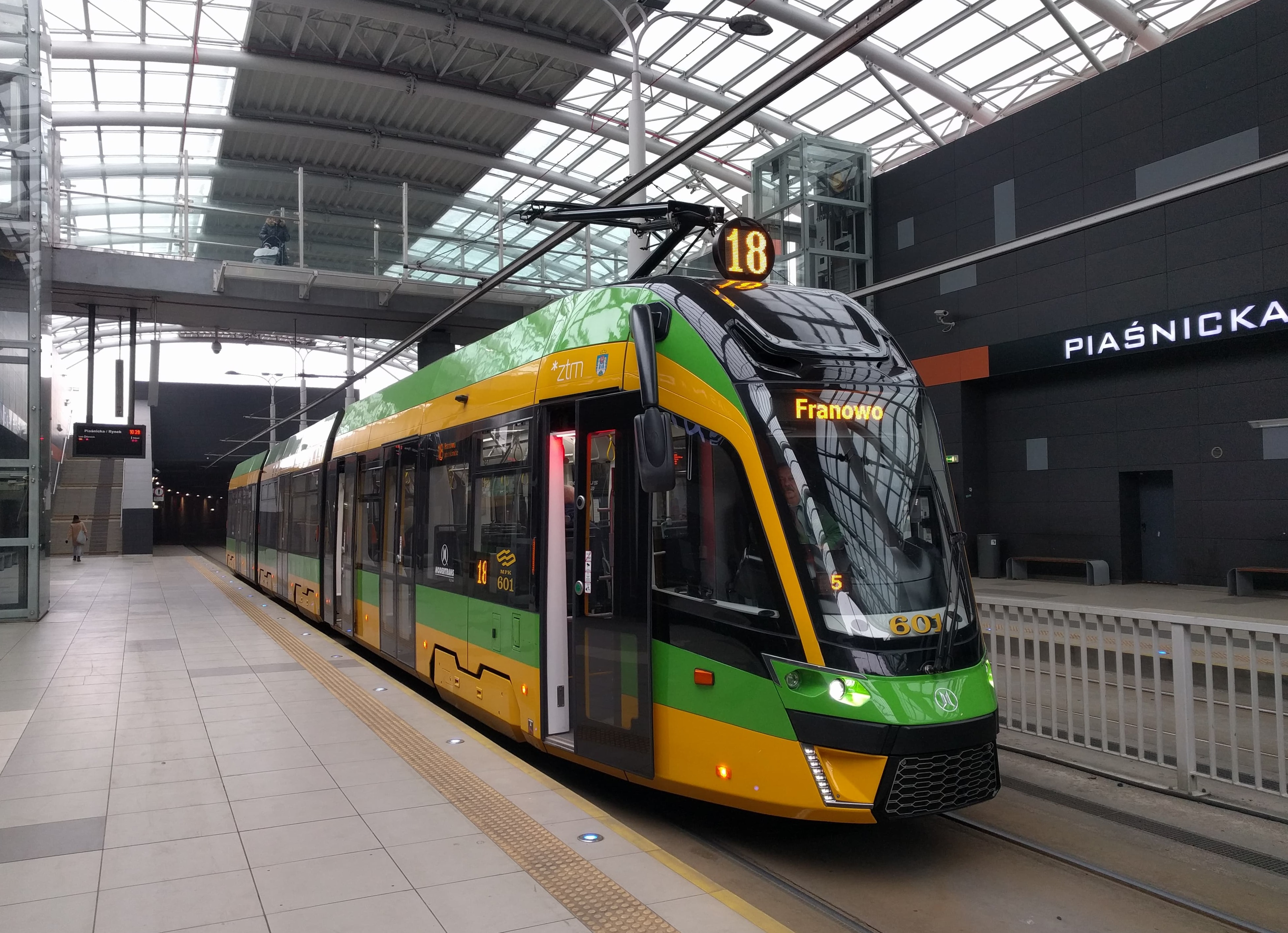
Poznań underground station in 2019

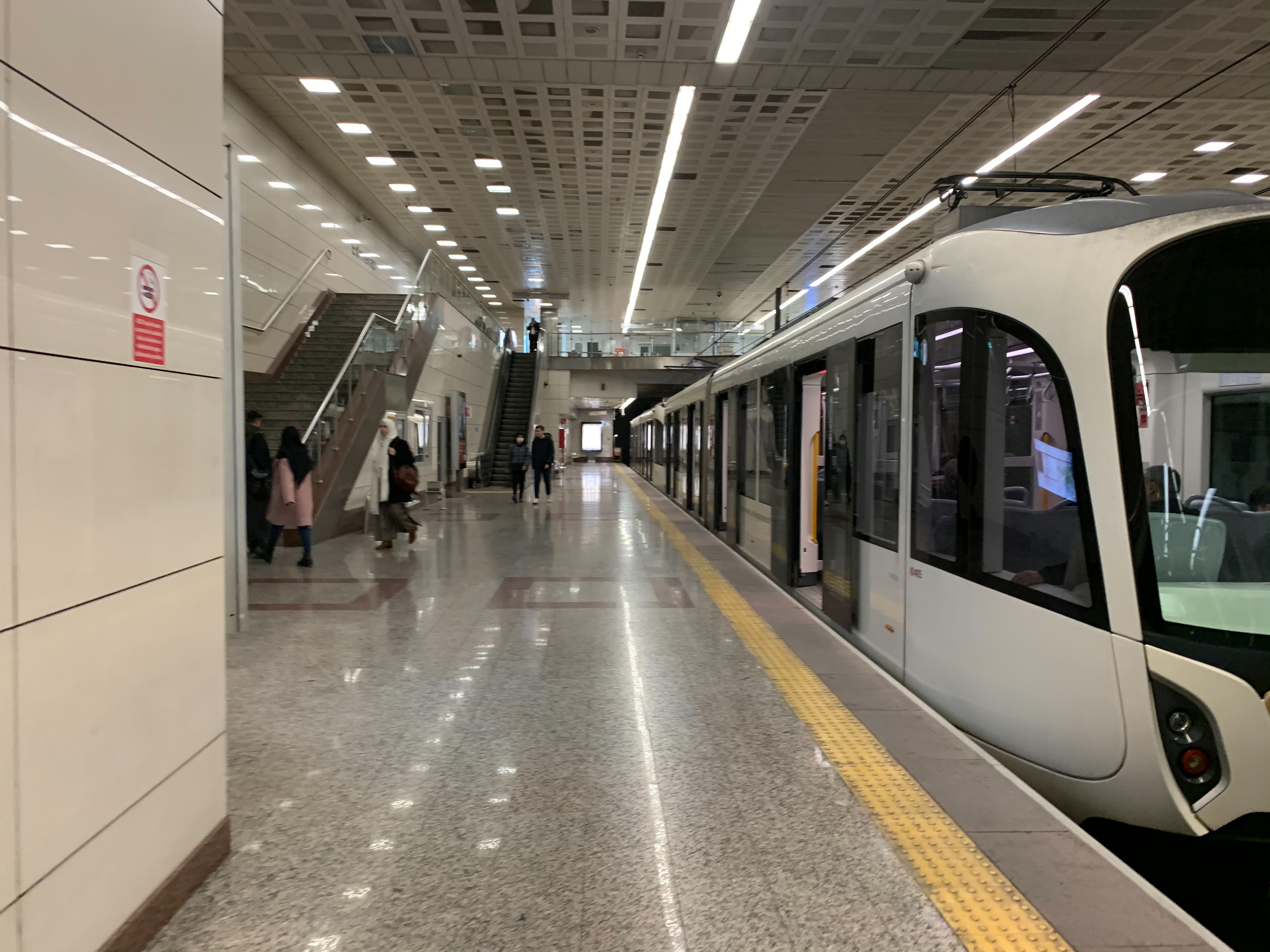
Istanbul underground station in 2020

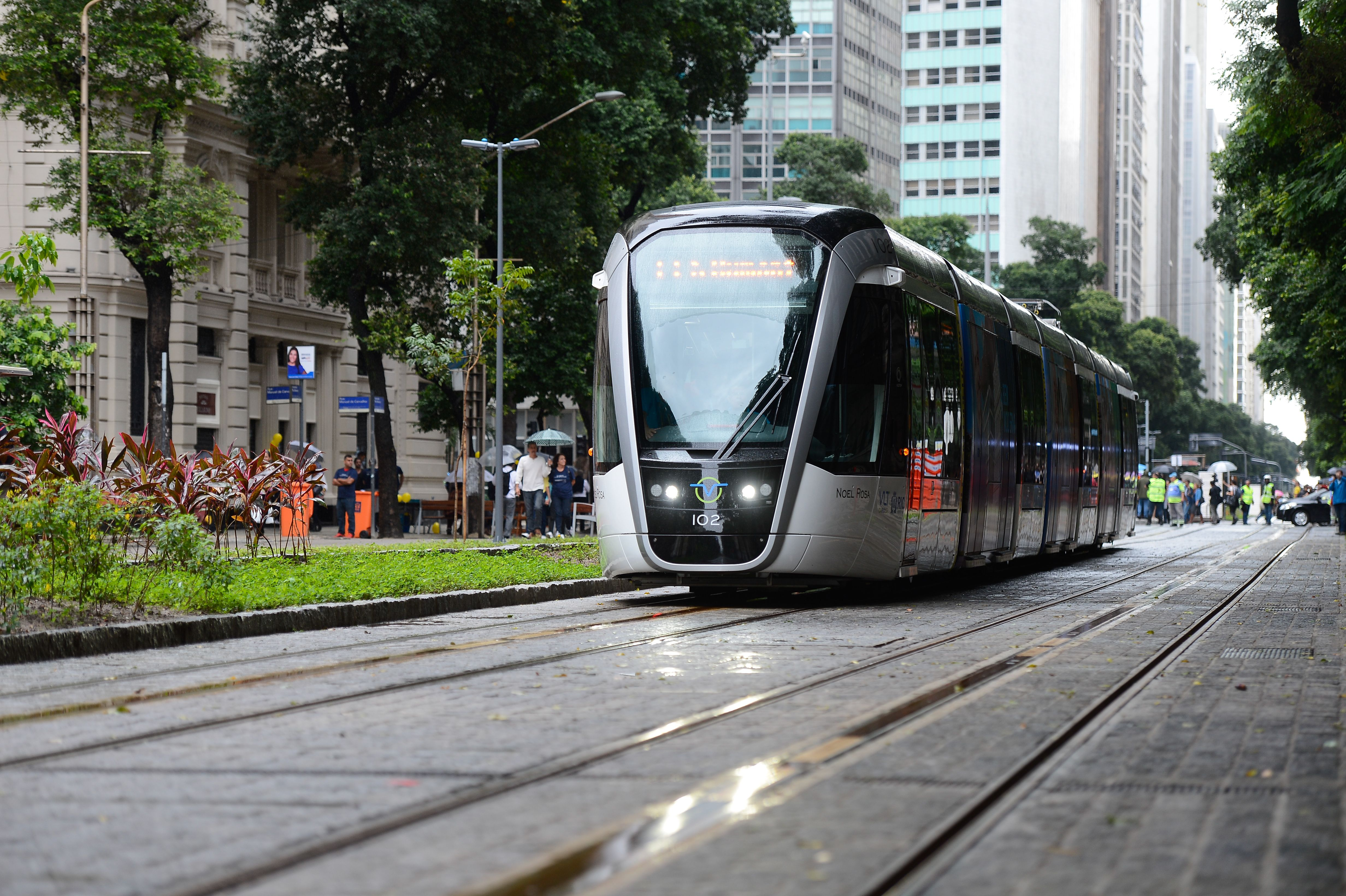
A light-rail vehicle of the VLT Carioca in Rio de Janeiro, Brazil

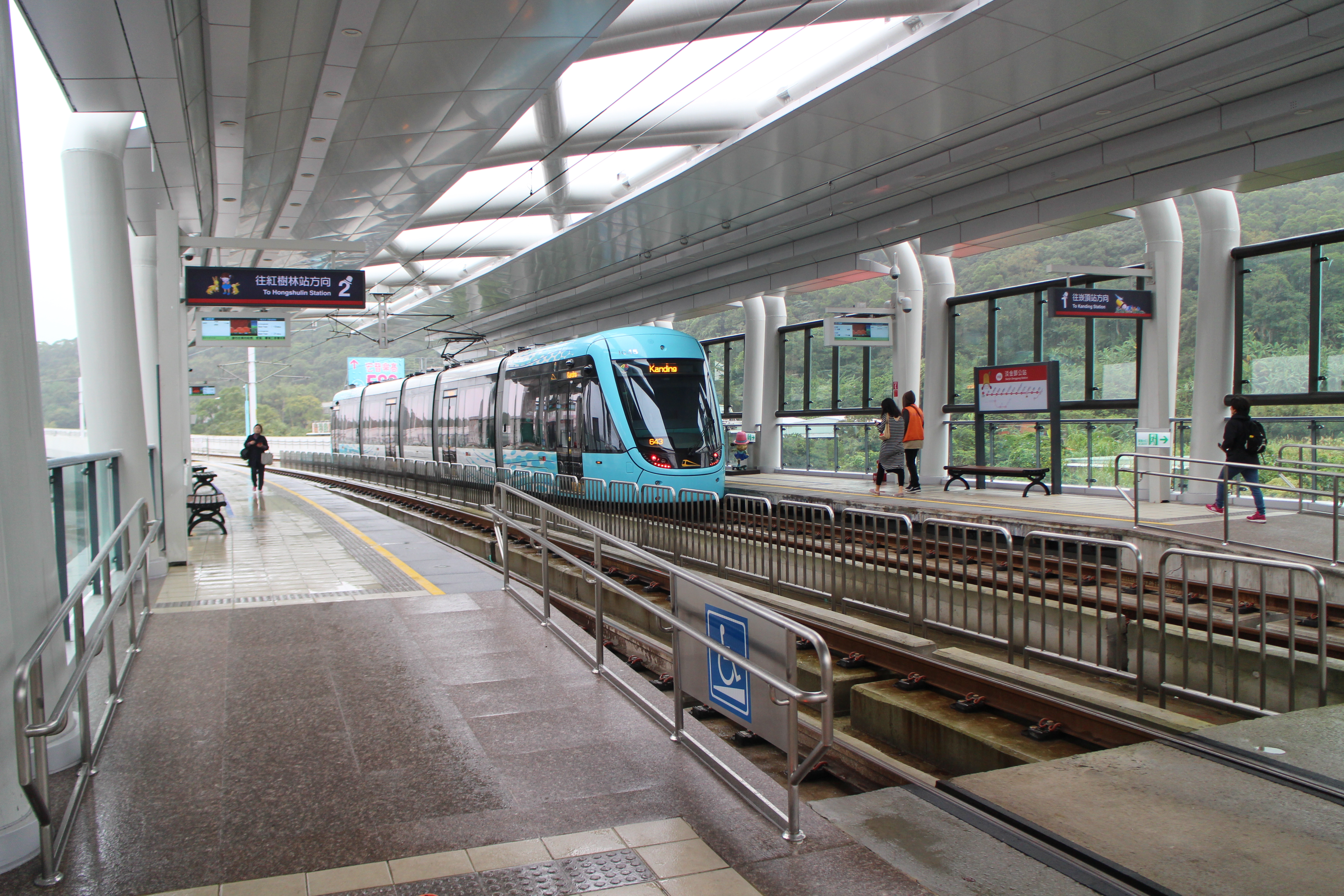
Danhai elevated station in 2018

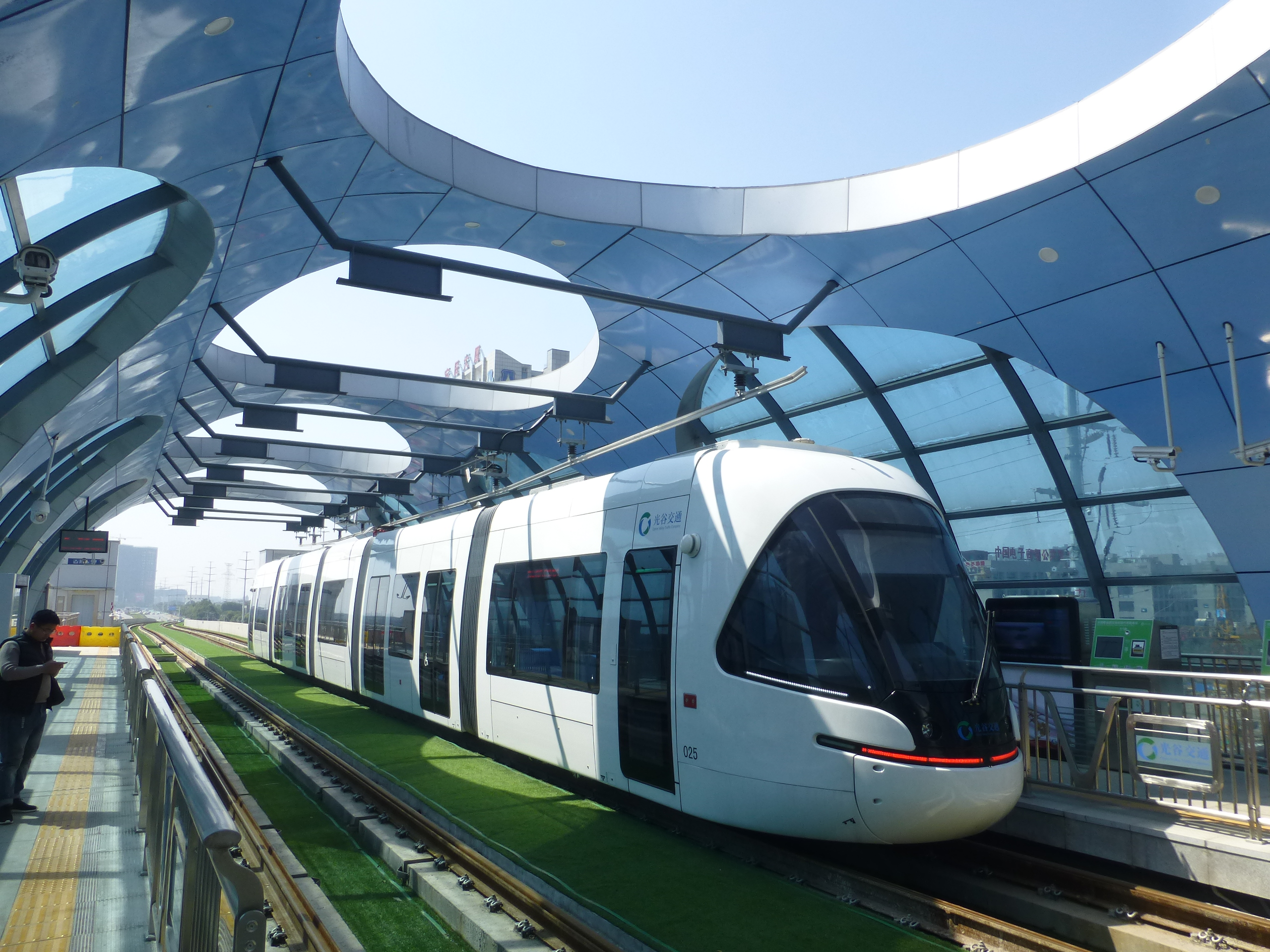
Light rail in Wuhan

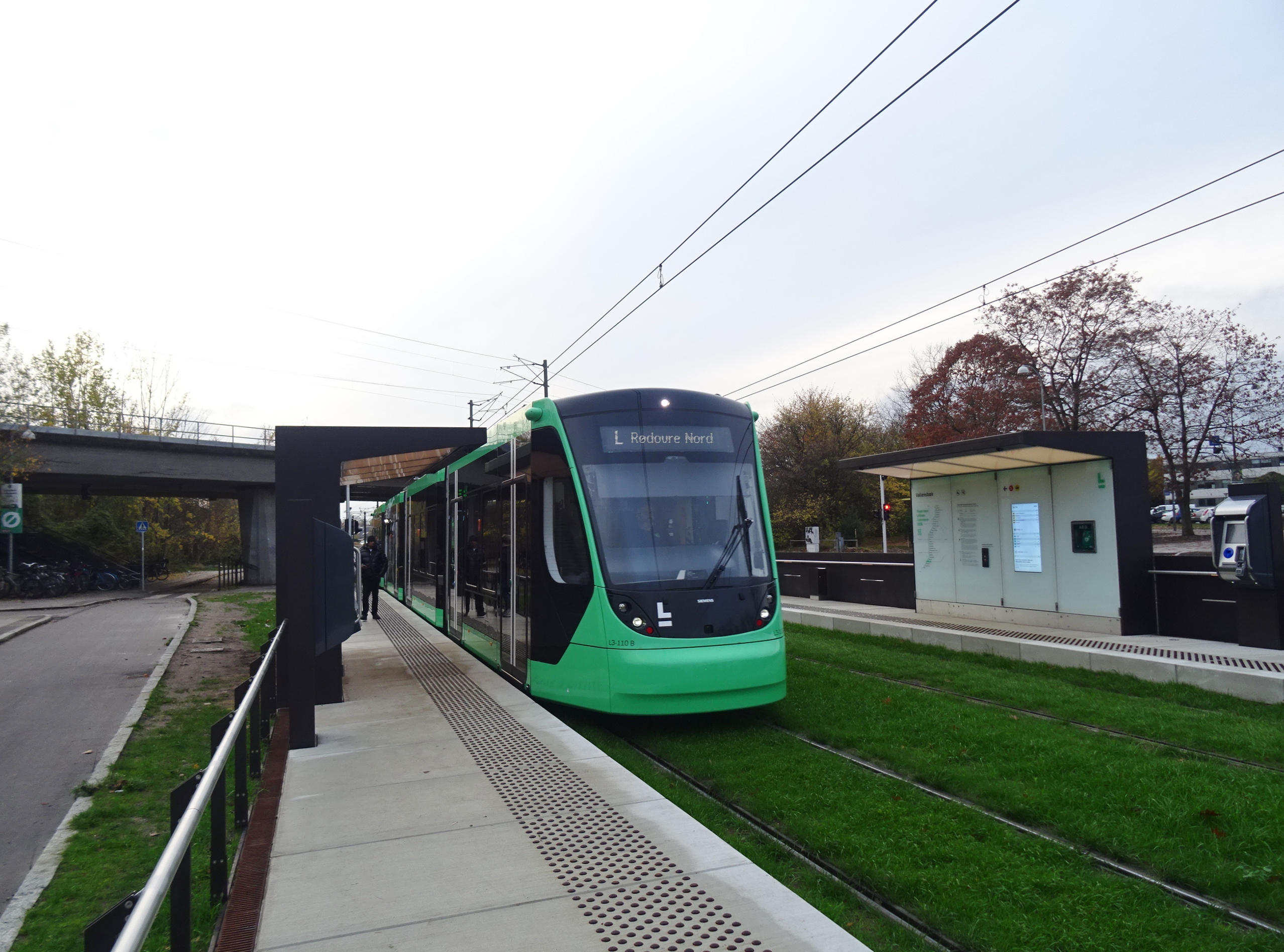
Siemens Avenio on green track at Delta Park Station in Denmark, 2025

== See also ==
- General Motors streetcar conspiracy
- Health impact of light rail systems
- History of tram and light rail transit systems by country
- Light rail in North America
- List of modern tramway and light rail systems in the United Kingdom
- List of rail transit systems in the United States
- List of town tramway systems (all-time lists)
- List of tram and light rail transit systems
  (operational systems only)
- Light metro
- Passenger rail terminology
- Premetro
- Railway electrification
- Rubber-tyred tram
