= Raguenet =

Raguenet may refer to:

- Nicolas-Jean-Baptiste Raguenet (1715–1793), French painter
- François Raguenet (1660–1722), French historian
