= Rouen =

Prefecture and commune in Normandy, France

- Prefecture and commune
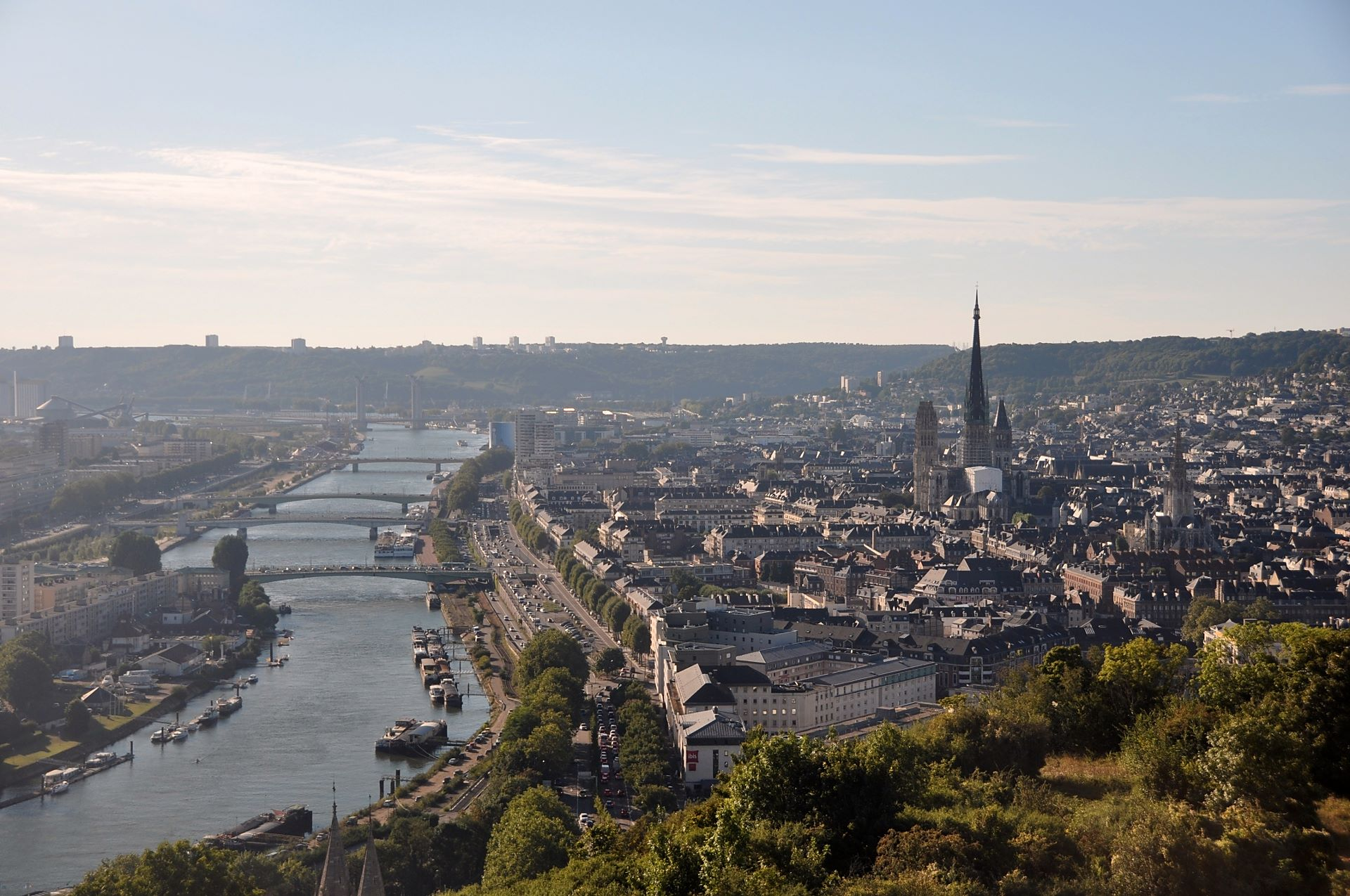
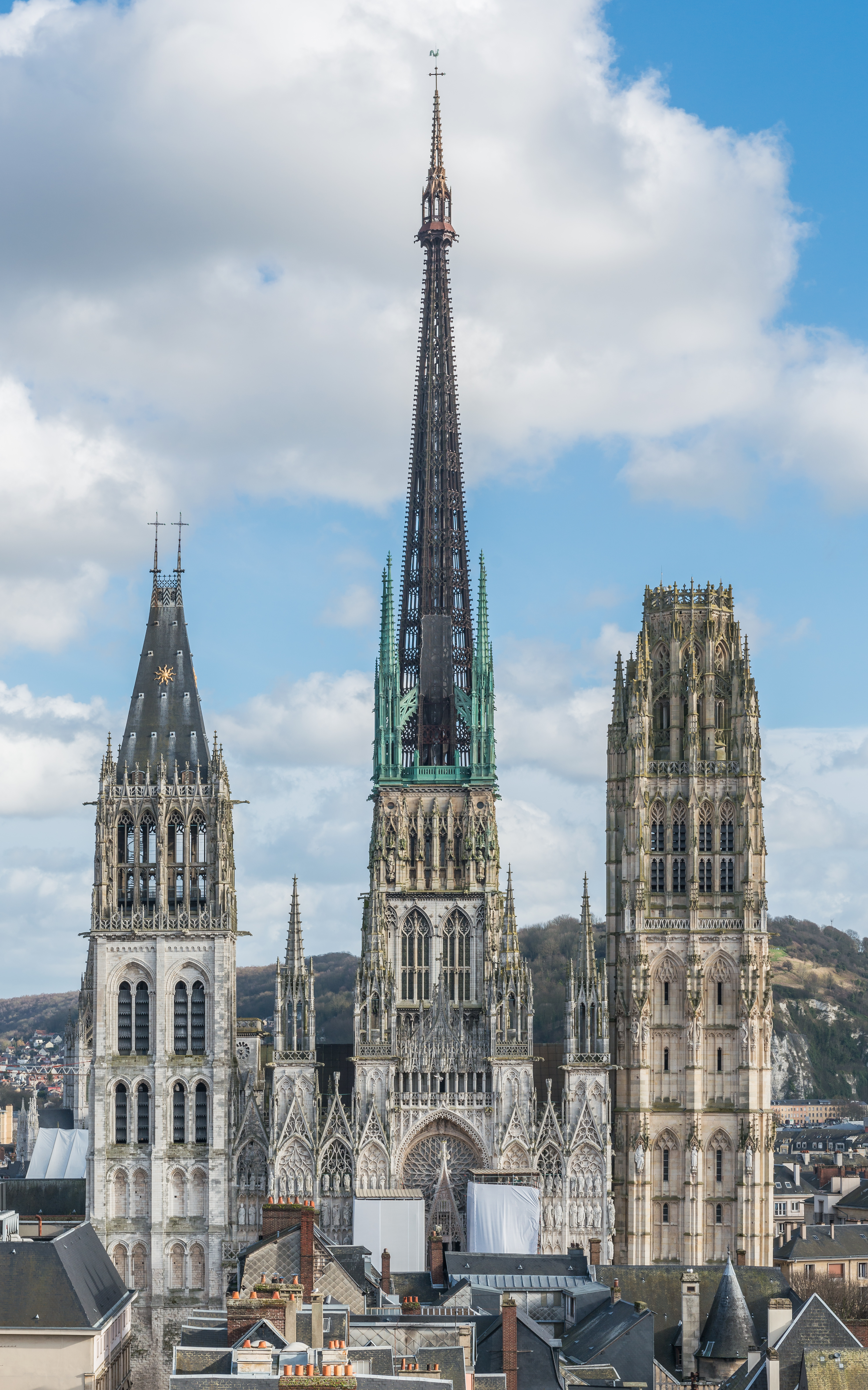
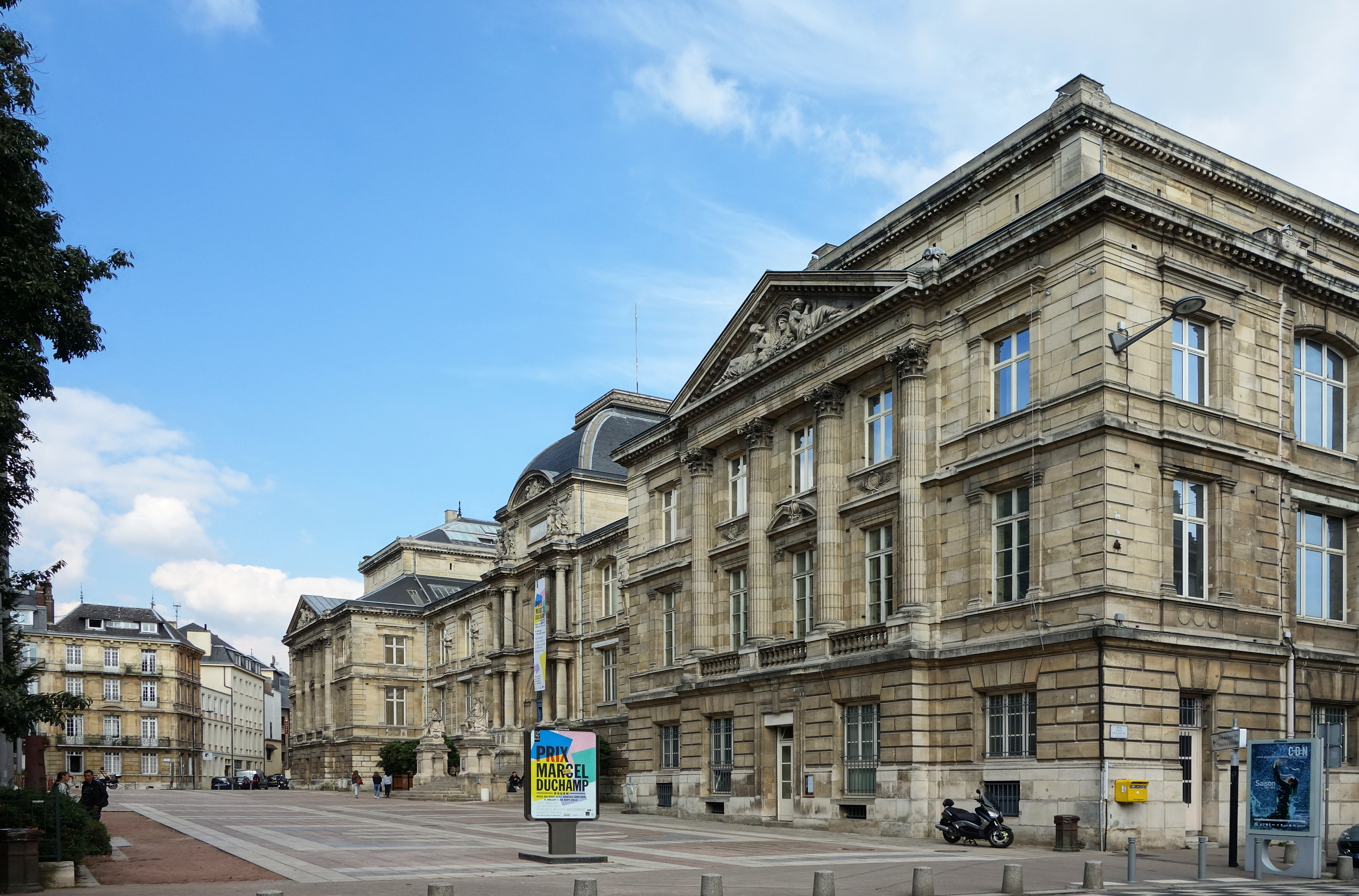
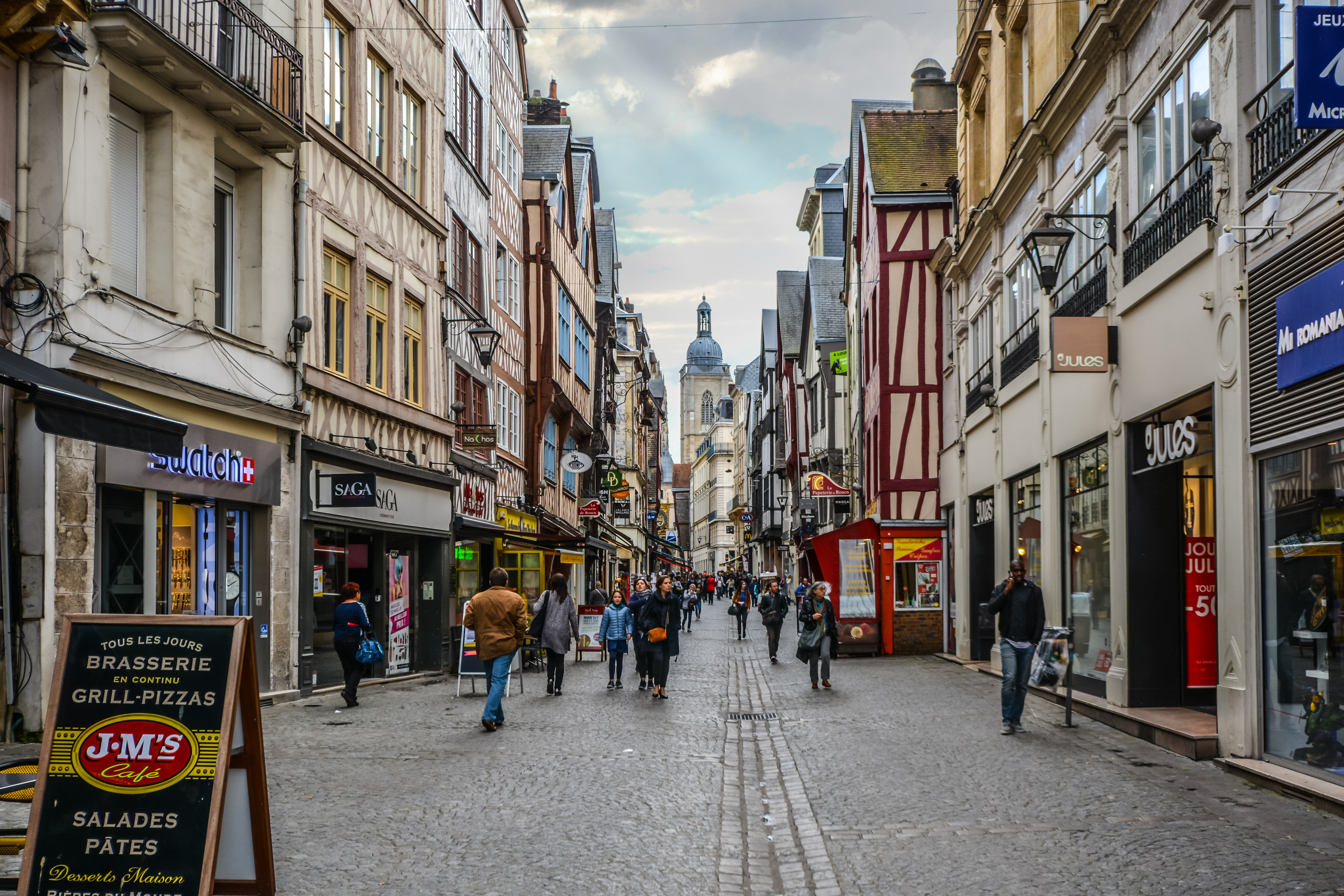
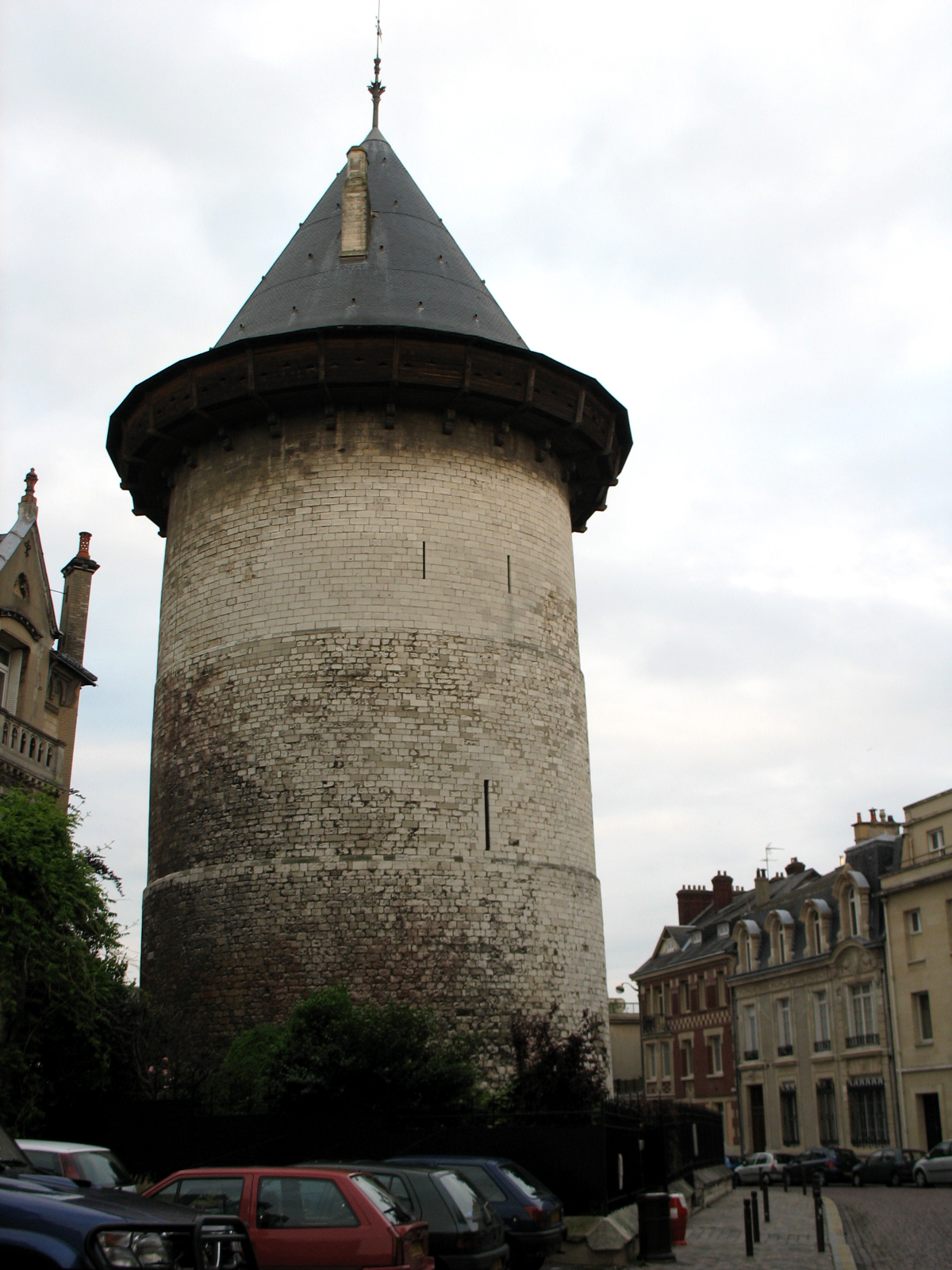
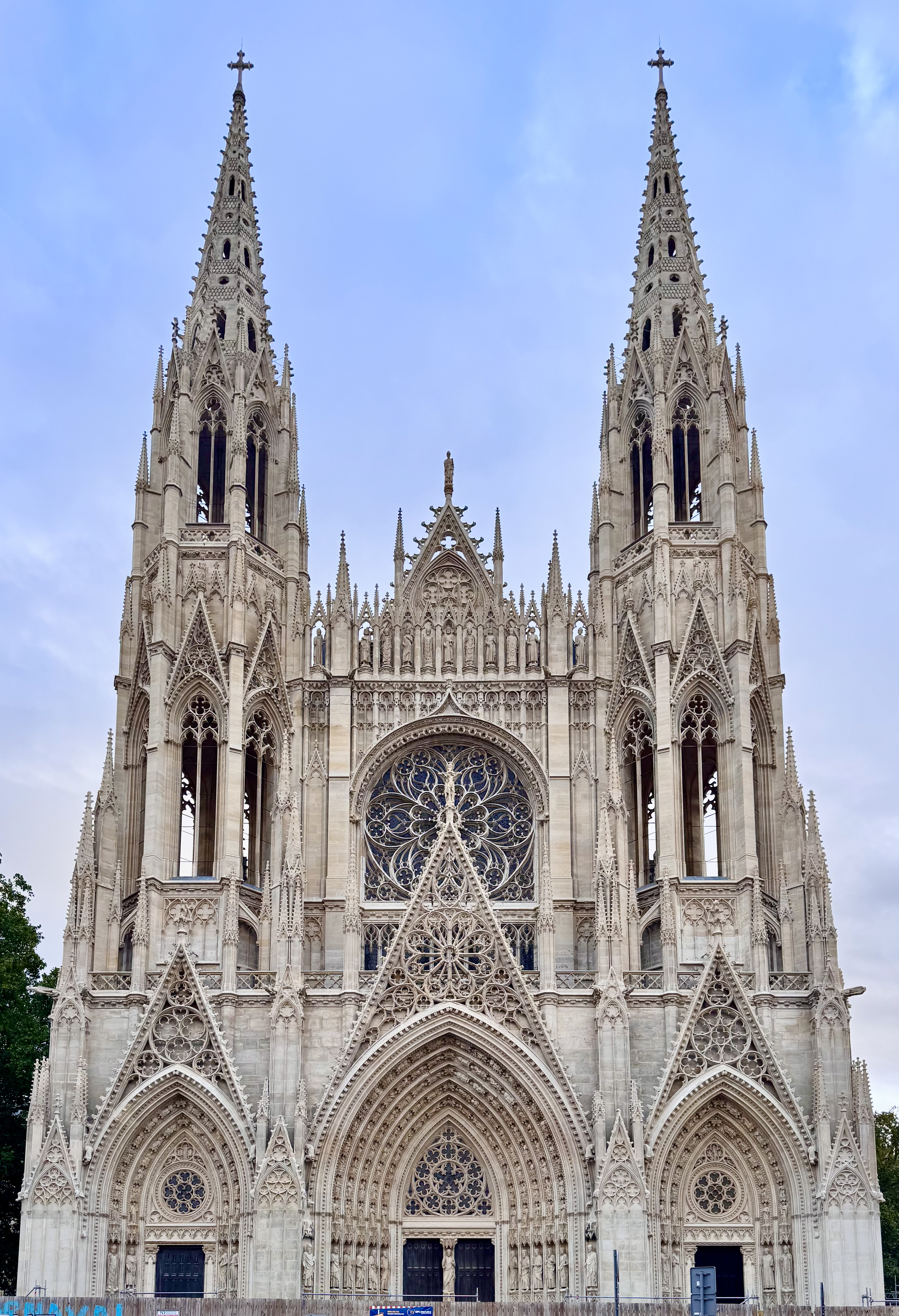
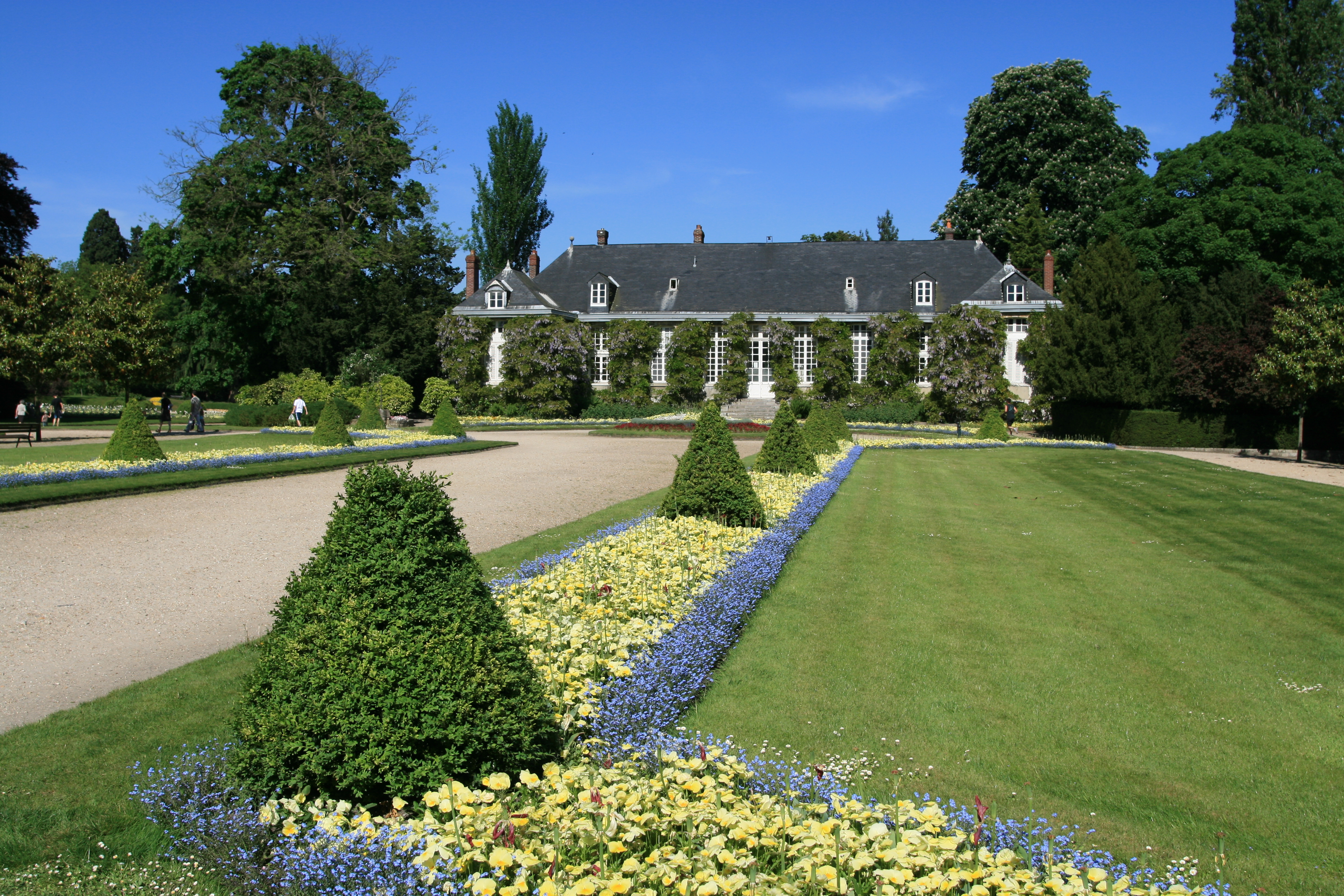
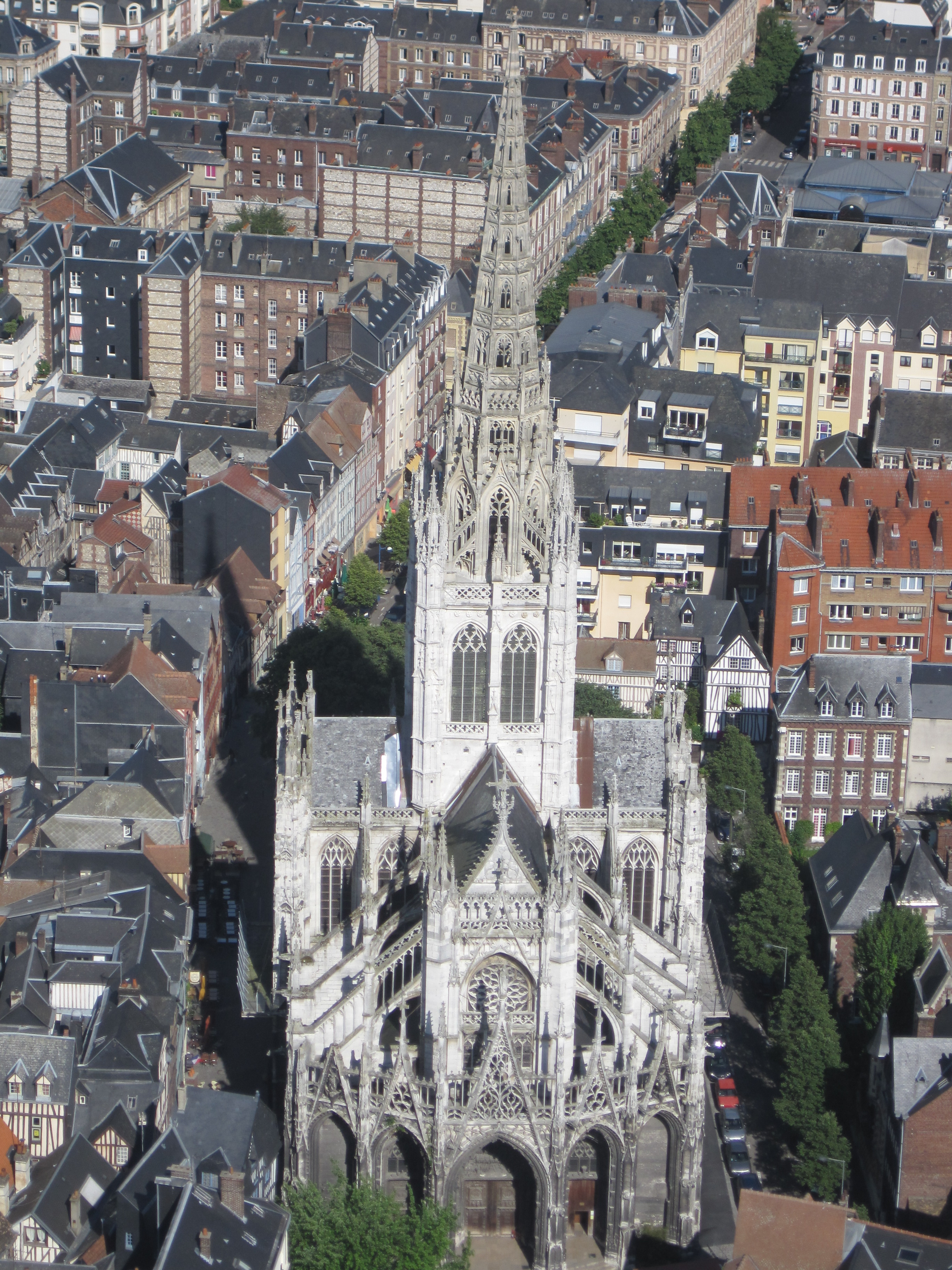
- Rouen in 2016 Rouen Cathedral Musée des Beaux-Arts de Rouen Rue du Gros-Horloge Rouen Castle Saint-Ouen Abbey Jardin des Plantes de Rouen Church of Saint-Maclou

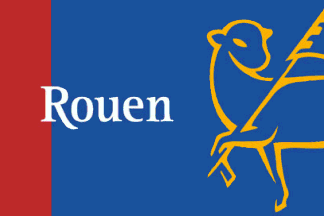
- Flag Coat of arms
- Location of Rouen
- Location within France Location within Normandy
- Coordinates: 49°26′34″N 01°05′19″E
- Country: France
- Region: Normandy
- Department: Seine-Maritime
- Arrondissement: Rouen
- Canton: 3 cantons
- Intercommunality: Métropole Rouen Normandie

Government
  - Mayor (2026–32): Nicolas Mayer-Rossignol (PS)
- Area^{1}: 21.38 km^{2} (8.25 sq mi)
  - Urban (2020): 461.1 km^{2} (178.0 sq mi)
  - Metro (2020): 2,792.2 km^{2} (1,078.1 sq mi)
- Population (2023): 117,662
  - Rank: 36th in France
  - Density: 5,503/km^{2} (14,250/sq mi)
  - Urban (2023): 481,104
  - Urban density: 1,043/km^{2} (2,702/sq mi)
  - Metro (2023): 715,239
  - Metro density: 256.16/km^{2} (663.44/sq mi)
- Time zone: UTC+01:00 (CET)
  - Summer (DST): UTC+02:00 (CEST)
- INSEE/Postal code: 76540 /
- Website: www.rouen.fr
- ^{1} French Land Register data, which excludes lakes, ponds, glaciers > 1 km^{2} (0.386 sq mi or 247 acres) and river estuaries.

Rouen (UK: /ˈruːɒ̃, ˈruːɒn/, US: /ruːˈɒ̃, ruːˈɒn/; French: [ʁwɑ̃] or [ʁu.ɑ̃]) is a city on the River Seine, in northwestern France. It is the prefecture of the region of Normandy and the department of Seine-Maritime. Formerly one of the largest and most prosperous cities of medieval Europe, the population of the metropolitan area (French: aire d'attraction) is 715,239 (2023). People from Rouen are known as Rouennais.

Rouen was the seat of the Exchequer of Normandy during the Middle Ages. It was one of the capitals of the Anglo-Norman and Angevin dynasties, which ruled both England and large parts of modern France from the 11th to the 15th centuries. From the 13th century onwards, the city experienced a remarkable economic boom, thanks in particular to the development of textile factories and river trade. Claimed by both the French and the English during the Hundred Years' War, it was on its soil that Joan of Arc was tried and burned alive on 30 May 1431. Severely damaged by the wave of bombing in 1944, it nevertheless regained its economic dynamism in the post-war period thanks to its industrial sites and its large seaport, which merged with the ports of Le Havre and Paris in 2021 to form the HAROPA Port.

Endowed with a prestige established during the medieval era, and with a long architectural heritage in its historical monuments, Rouen is an important cultural capital. Several renowned establishments are located here, such as the Museum of Fine Arts, Le Secq des Tournelles museum, and Rouen Cathedral.

Seat of an archdiocese, it also hosts a court of appeal and a university. Every four to six years, Rouen becomes the showcase for a large gathering of sailing ships called "L'Armada"; this event makes the city an occasional capital of the maritime world.

== History ==
Rouen was founded by the Gaulish tribe of the Veliocasses, who controlled a large area in the lower Seine valley. They called it Ratumacos; the Romans called it Rotomagus. It was considered the second city of Gallia Lugdunensis after Lugdunum (Lyon) itself. Under the reorganization of Diocletian, Rouen was the chief city of the divided province Lugdunensis secunda and reached the apogee of its Roman development, with an amphitheatre and thermae of which foundations remain. In the 5th century, it became the seat of a bishopric and later a capital of Merovingian Neustria.

From their first incursion into the lower valley of the Seine in 841, the Normans overran Rouen. From 912, Rouen was the capital of the Duchy of Normandy and residence of the local dukes, until William the Conqueror moved his residence to Caen. In 1150, Rouen received its founding charter which permitted self-government.

During the 12th century, Rouen was the site of a yeshiva known as La Maison Sublime. Discovered in 1976, it is now a museum. At that time, about 6,000 Jews lived in the town, comprising about 20% of the population.

On 24 June 1204, King Philip II Augustus of France entered Rouen and definitively annexed Normandy to the French Kingdom. He demolished the Norman castle and replaced it with his own, the château Bouvreuil, built on the site of the Gallo-Roman amphitheatre. A textile industry developed based on wool imported from England, for which the cities of Flanders and Brabant were constantly competitors, and finding its market in the Champagne fairs. Rouen also depended for its prosperity on the river traffic of the Seine, on which it enjoyed a monopoly that reached as far upstream as Paris.

In the 13th and 14th centuries, urban strife threatened the city: in 1291, the mayor was assassinated and noble residences in the city were pillaged. Philip IV reimposed order and suppressed the city's charter and the lucrative monopoly on river traffic, but he was quite willing to allow the Rouennais to repurchase their old liberties in 1294. In 1306, he decided to expel the Jewish community of Rouen, then numbering some five or six thousand. In 1389, another urban revolt of the underclass occurred, the Harelle. It was suppressed with the withdrawal of Rouen's charter and river-traffic privileges once more.

During the Hundred Years' War, on 19 January 1419, Rouen surrendered after a long siege to Henry V of England, who annexed Normandy once again to the Plantagenet domains. French soldier Alain Blanchard summarily hung English prisoners of war from the city walls during the siege, for which he was beheaded after Rouen fell, while canon and vicar general of Rouen Robert de Livet excommunicated Henry V, resulting in De Livet being imprisoned for five years in England. Joan of Arc, who supported a return to French rule, was burned at the stake on 30 May 1431 in Rouen, where most inhabitants supported the duke of Burgundy, the French king's enemy. The burned ash was thrown into the sea because the English did not want the spirit to be there. The king of France, Charles VII, recaptured the town in 1449.

Rouen was staunchly Catholic during the French Wars of Religion, and underwent an unsuccessful five-month siege in 1591/2 by the Protestant Henry IV of France and an English force under Earl of Essex. A brief account by an English participant has survived.

During the repression of January and February 1894, the police conducted raids targeting the anarchists living there, without much success. The first competitive motor race ran from Paris to Rouen in 1894.

During the German occupation in World War II, the Kriegsmarine had its headquarters located in a chateau on what is now the Rouen Business School. The city was heavily damaged during the same war on D-Day, and its famed cathedral was almost destroyed by Allied bombs.

== Main sights ==
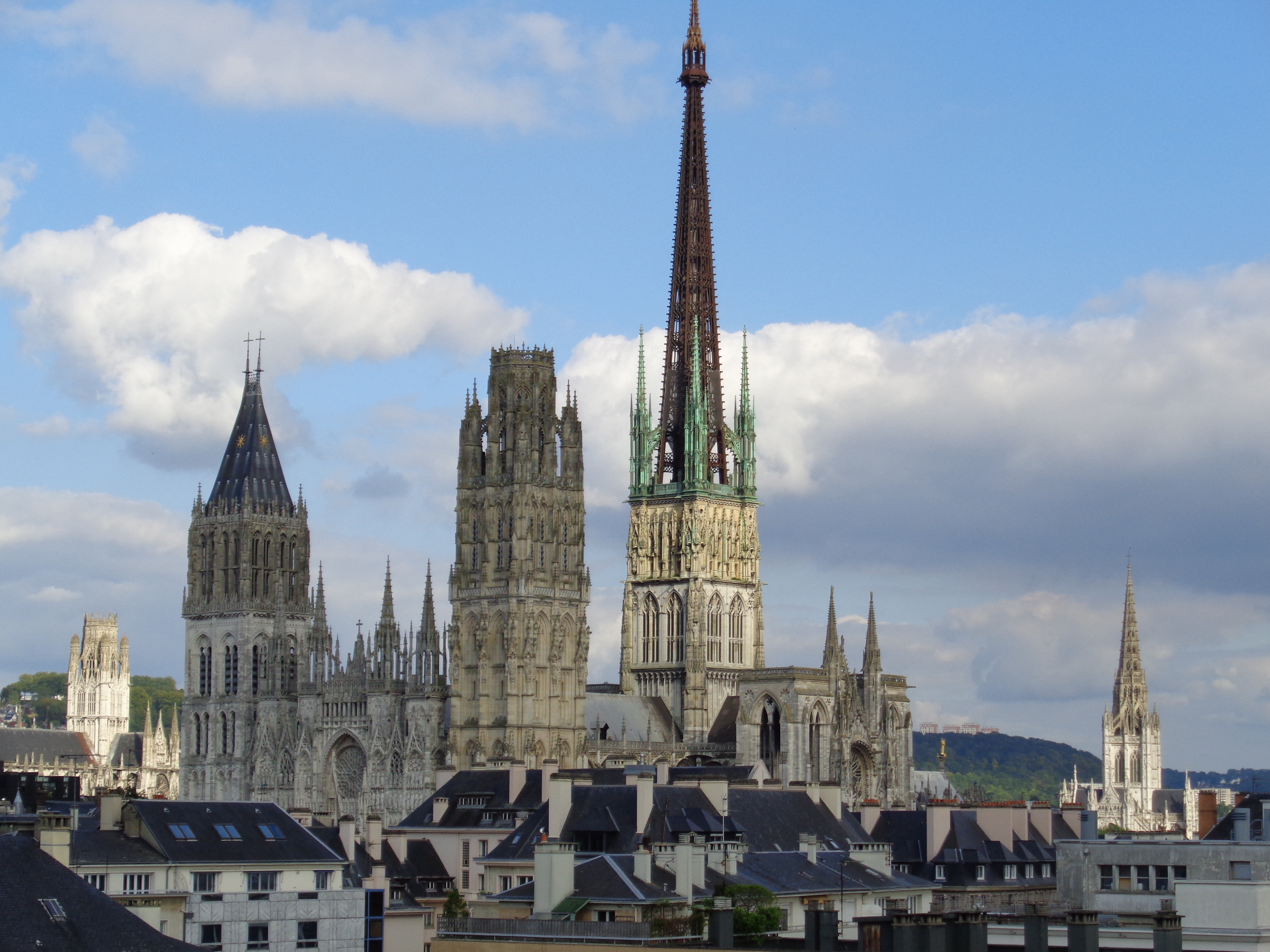
Left to right: Saint-Ouen, Rouen Cathedral and Saint-Maclou

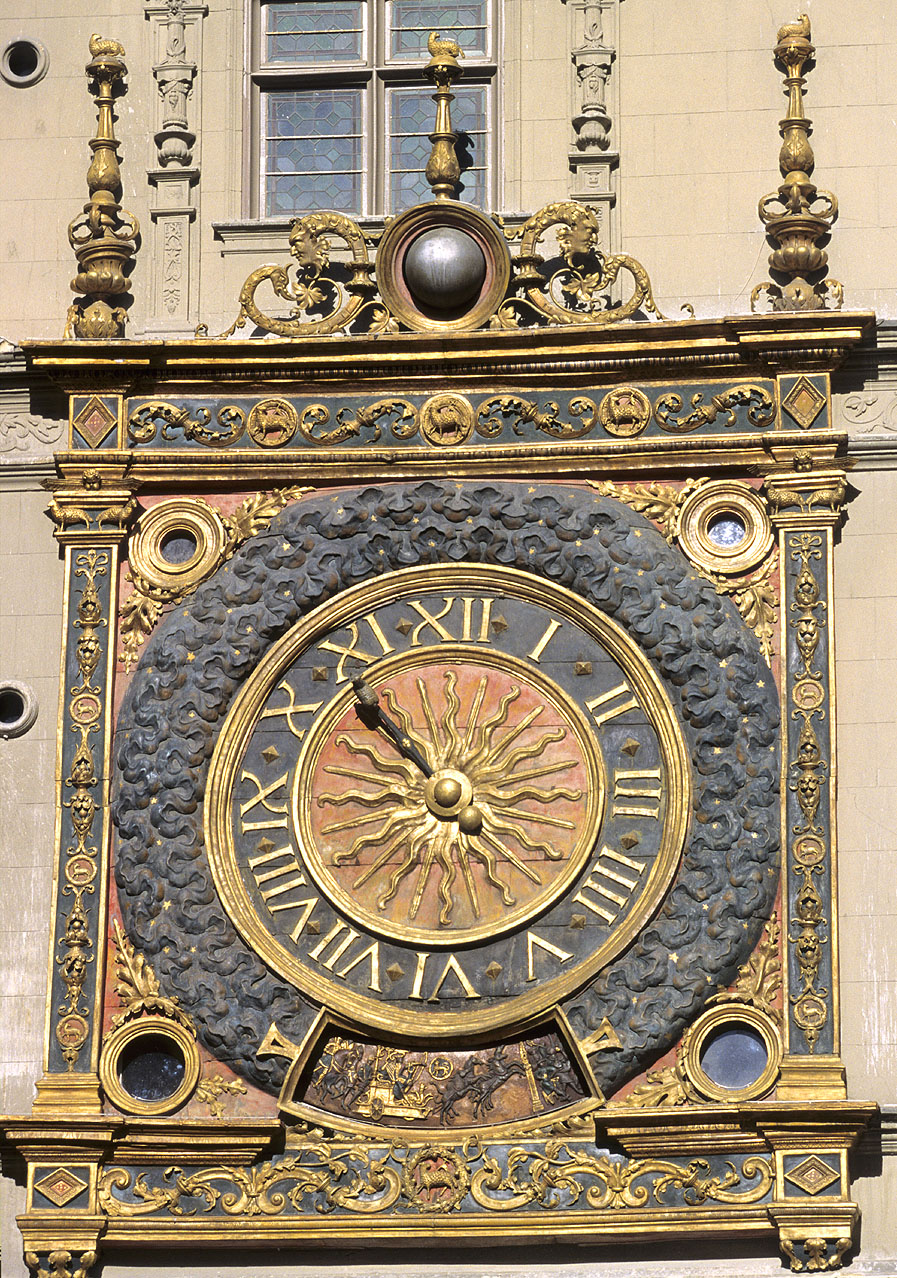
Gros-Horloge

Rouen is known for Rouen Cathedral, with its Tour de Beurre (butter tower) financed by the sale of indulgences for the consumption of butter during Lent. The cathedral's gothic façade (completed in the 16th century) was the subject of a series of paintings by Claude Monet, some of which are exhibited in the Musée d'Orsay in Paris.

The Gros Horloge is an astronomical clock dating back to the 14th century. It is located in the Gros Horloge street.

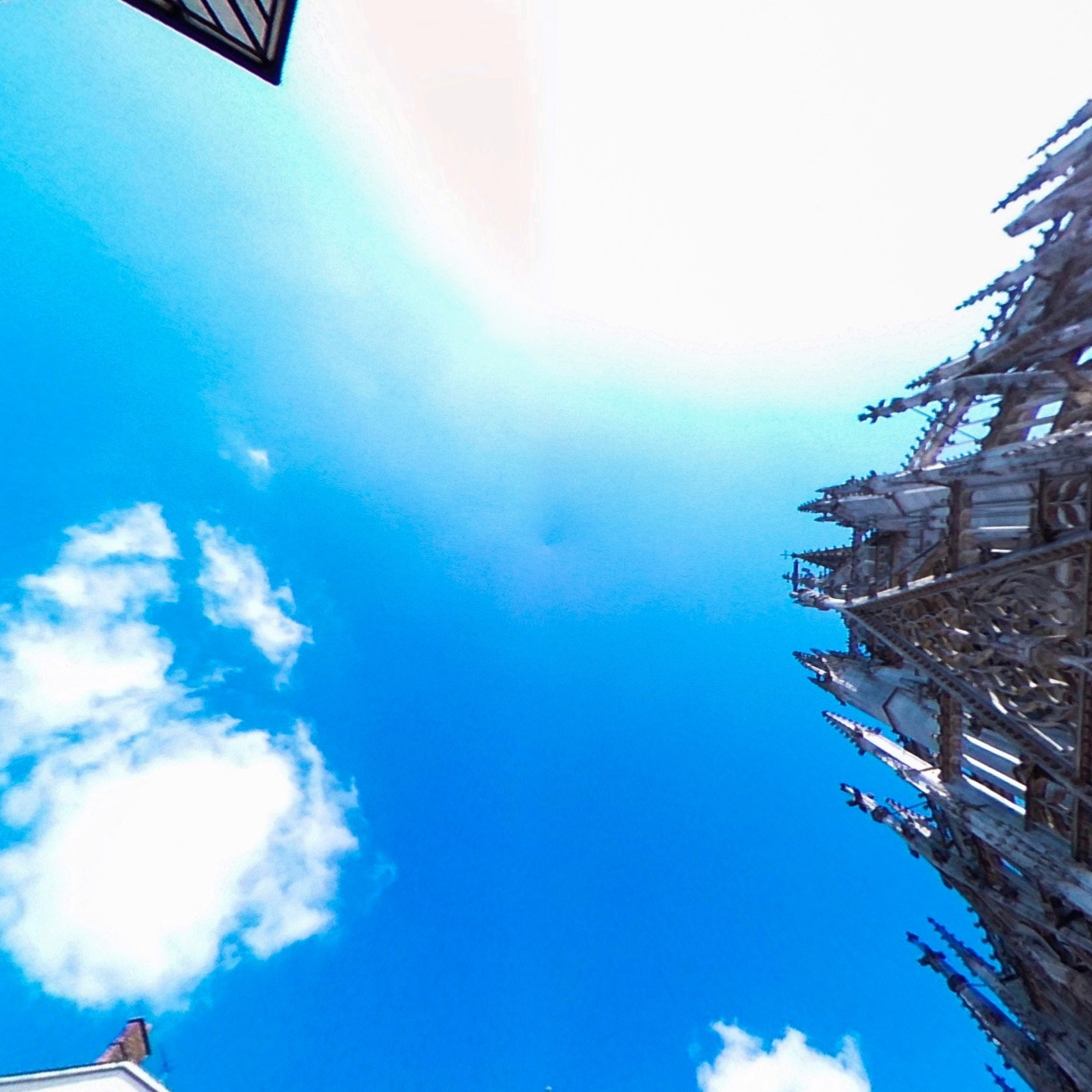
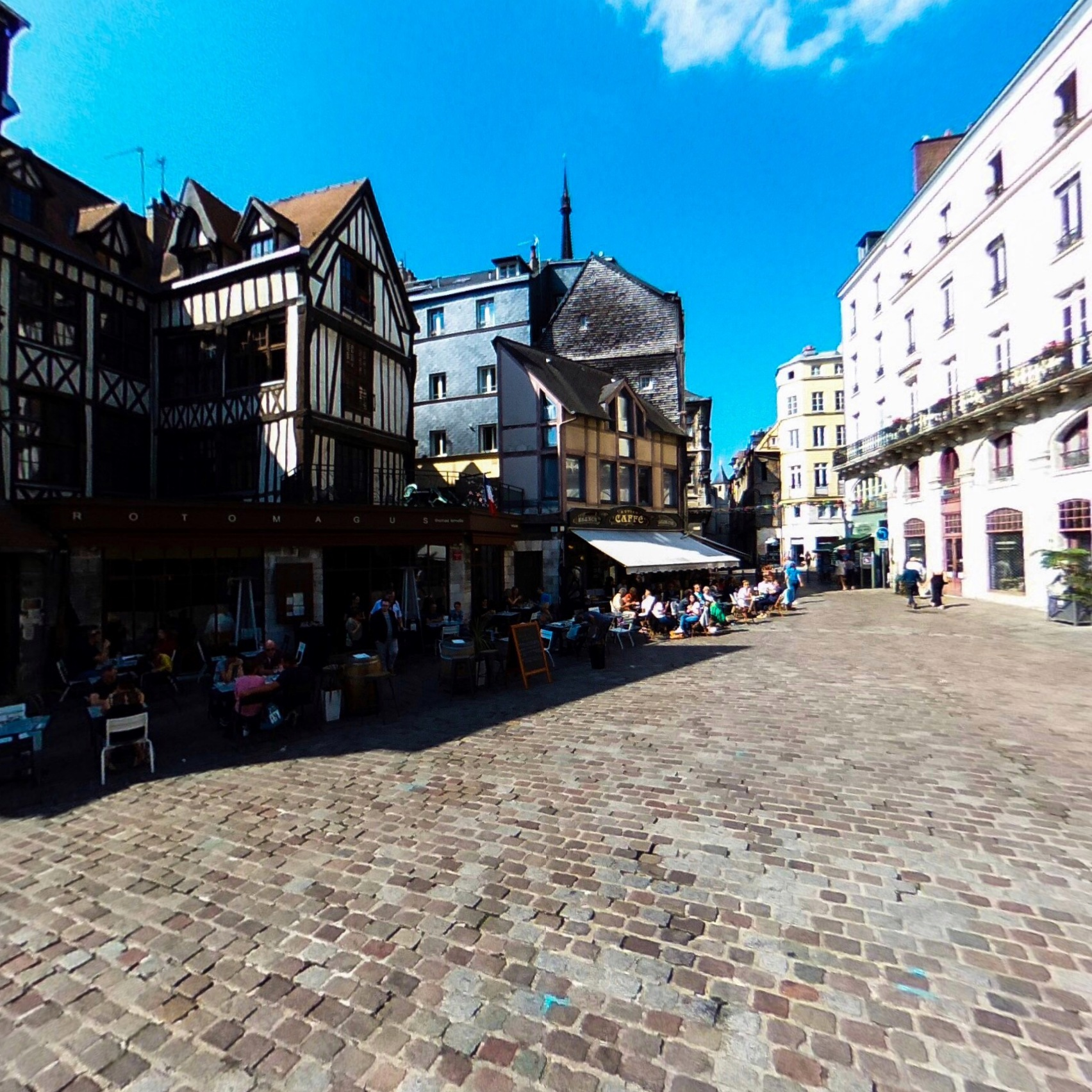
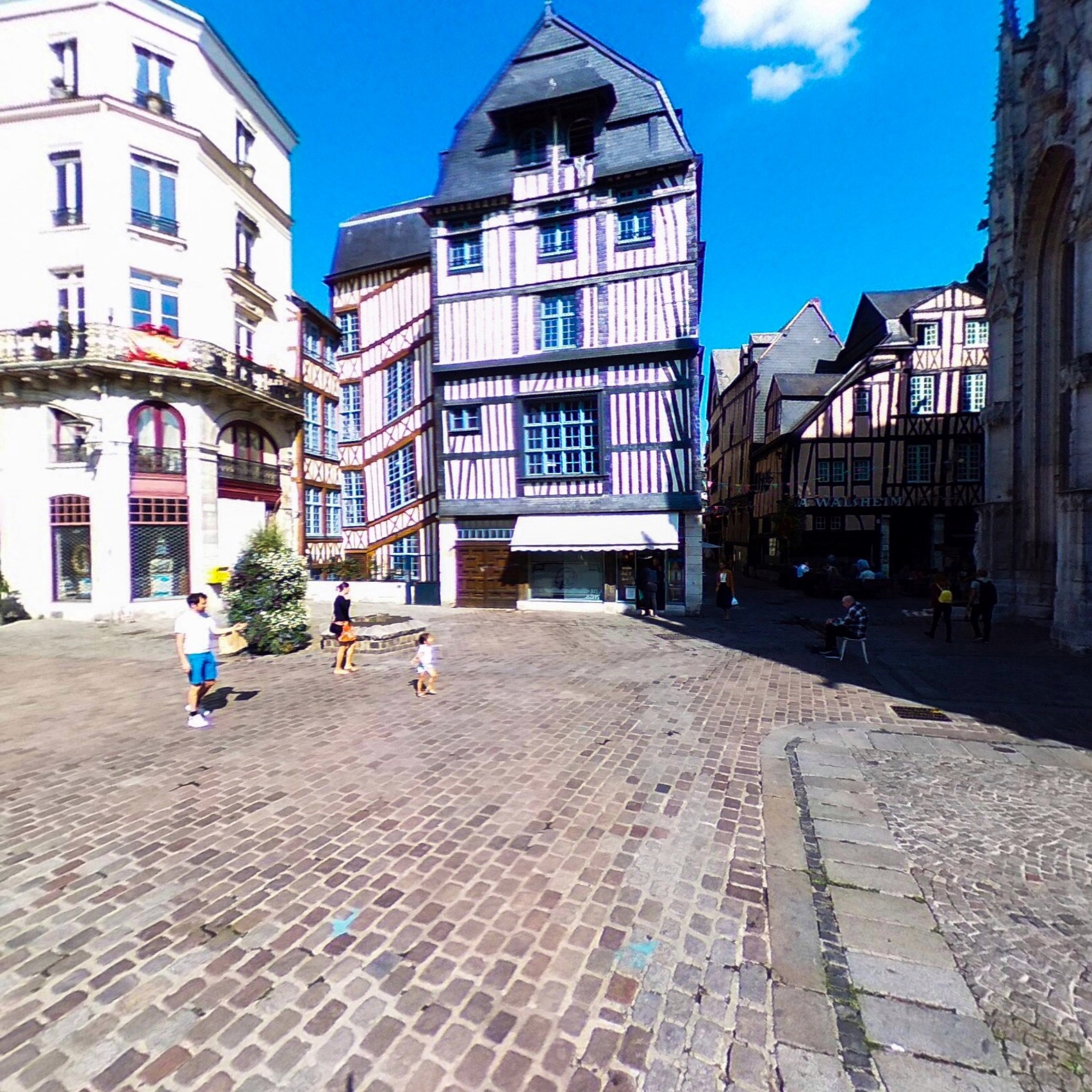
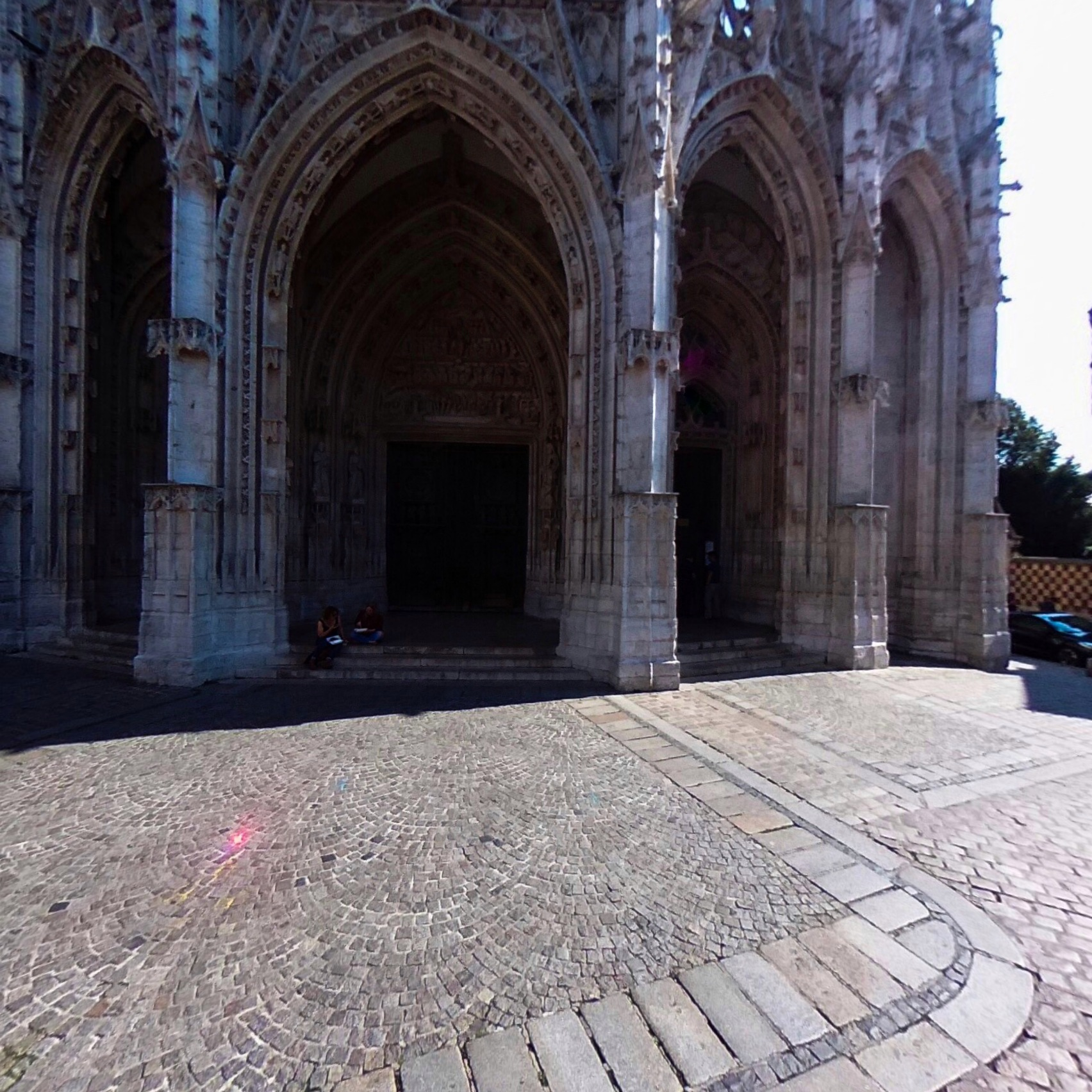
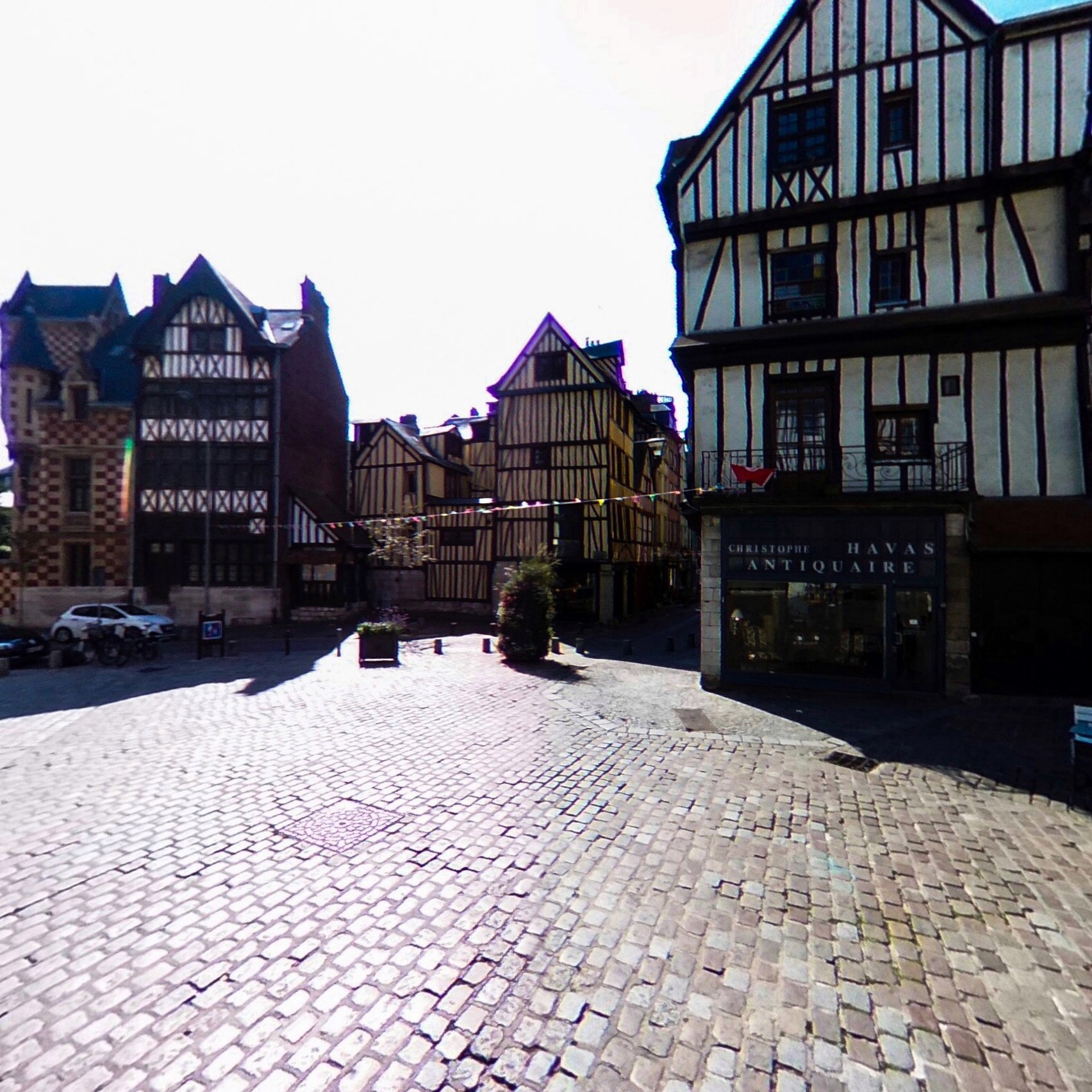
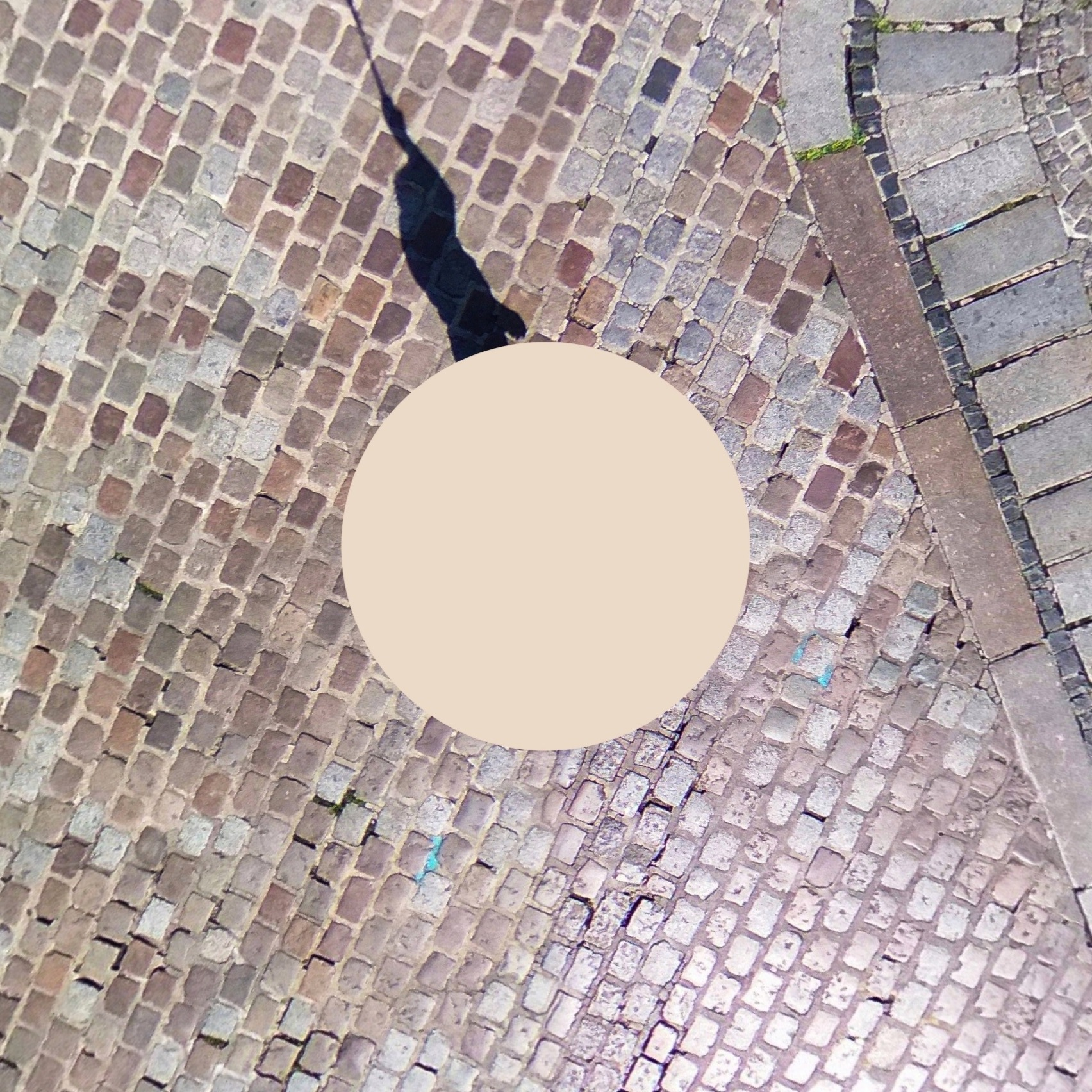
Place Barthélémy with the Church of Saint-Maclou, 360°-panorama 2019

Other famous structures include Rouen Castle, whose keep is known as the tour Jeanne d'Arc, where Joan of Arc was brought in 1431 to be threatened with torture (contrary to popular belief, she was not imprisoned there but in the tour de lady Pucelle (since destroyed); the Church of Saint Ouen (12th–15th century); the Palais de Justice, which was once the seat of the Parlement (French court of law) of Normandy; the Gothic Church of St Maclou (15th century); and the Museum of Fine Arts and Ceramics which contains a splendid collection of faïence and porcelain for which Rouen was renowned during the 16th to 18th centuries. Rouen is also noted for its surviving half-timbered buildings.

There are many museums in Rouen: the Musée des Beaux-Arts de Rouen, an art museum with paintings by well-known artists such as Claude Monet and Géricault; the Musée maritime fluvial et portuaire, a museum on the history of the port of Rouen and navigation; Musée des Antiquités, an art and history museum with local works from the Bronze Age through the Renaissance; the Musée de la céramique, the Museum of Natural History, founded in 1834 and re-opened in 2007; and the Musée Le Secq des Tournelles, which houses various collections of objects.

The Jardin des Plantes de Rouen is a notable botanical garden once owned by Scottish banker John Law, dating from 1840 in its present form. It was the site of Élisa Garnerin's parachute jump from a balloon in 1817. There is also a park and garden at the Champs de Mars, to the east of the city centre. The Paris–Rouen motor race of 1894, Le Petit Journal Horseless Carriages Contest, ended at the Champs de Mars.

In the centre of the Place du Vieux Marché (the site of Joan of Arc's pyre) is the modern church of St Joan of Arc. This is a large, modern structure which dominates the square. The form of the building represents an upturned Viking boat and a fish shape.

Rouen was also home to the French Grand Prix, hosting the race at the nearby Rouen-Les-Essarts track sporadically between 1952 and 1968. In 1999 Rouen authorities demolished the grandstands and other remnants of Rouen's racing past. Today, little remains beyond the public roads that formed the circuit.

Rouen has an opera house, whose formal name is "Rouen Normandy Opera House – Theatre of Arts" (in French: Opéra de Rouen Normandie – Théâtre des arts).

== Transport ==
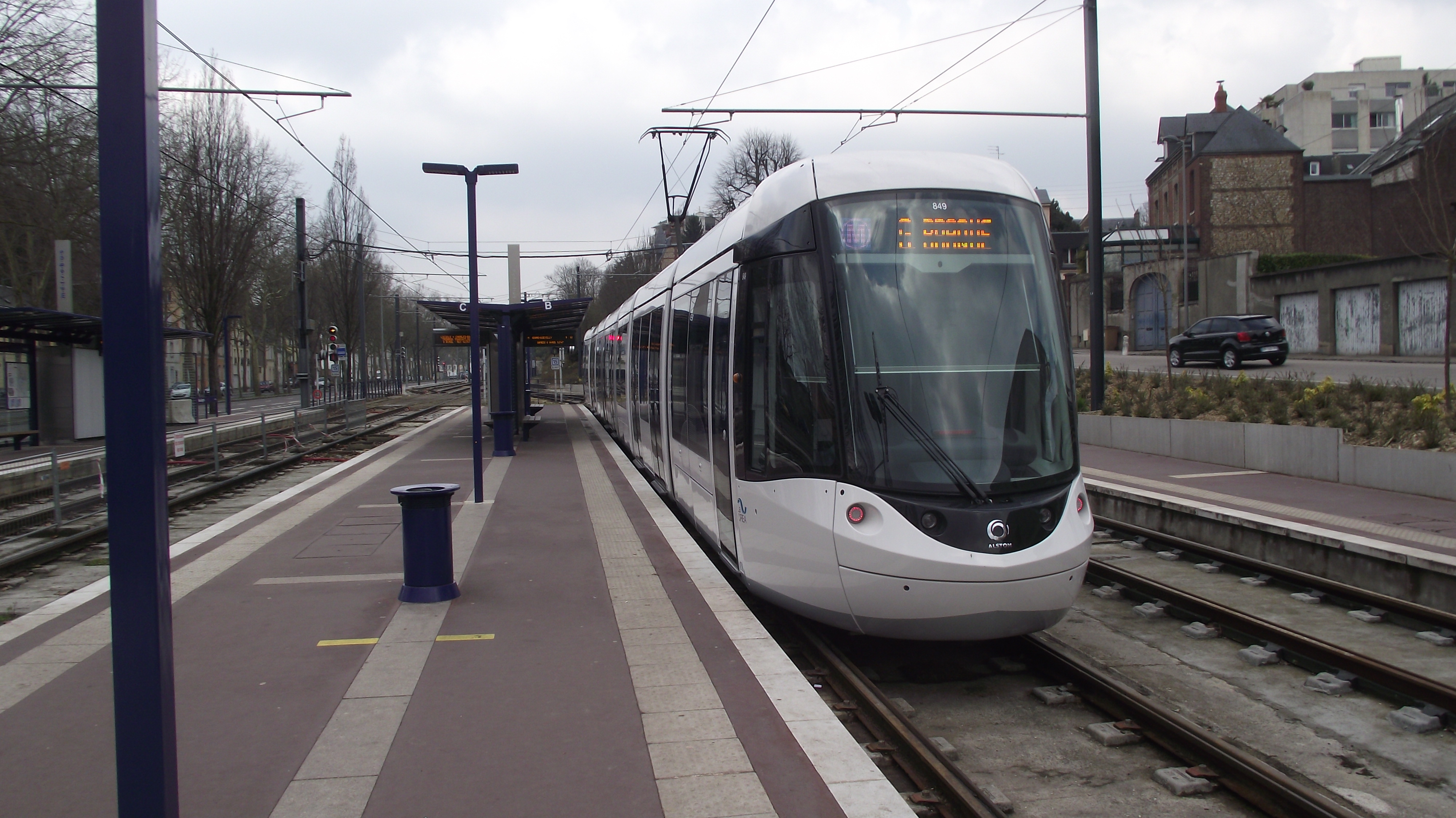
The tramway

Mainline trains operate from Gare de Rouen-Rive-Droite to Le Havre and Paris, and regional trains to Caen, Dieppe and other local destinations in Normandy. Daily direct trains operate to Amiens and Lille, and direct TGVs (high-speed trains) connect daily with Lyon and Marseille.

City transportation in Rouen consists of a tram and a bus system. The tramway branches into two lines out of a tunnel under the city centre. Rouen is also served by TEOR (Transport Est-Ouest Rouennais) and by buses run in conjunction with the tramway by TCAR (Transports en commun de l'agglomération rouennaise), a subsidiary of Transdev.

Rouen has its own airport. However, there are no scheduled flights to/from Rouen Airport. Residents in the city normally use Paris's Charles de Gaulle Airport, which is located 159 km (99 mi) south east of Rouen.

The Seine is a major axis for maritime cargo links in the Port of Rouen. The Cross-Channel ferry ports of Caen, Le Havre, Dieppe (50 minutes) and Calais, and the Channel Tunnel are within easy driving distance (two and a half hours or less).

== Administration ==
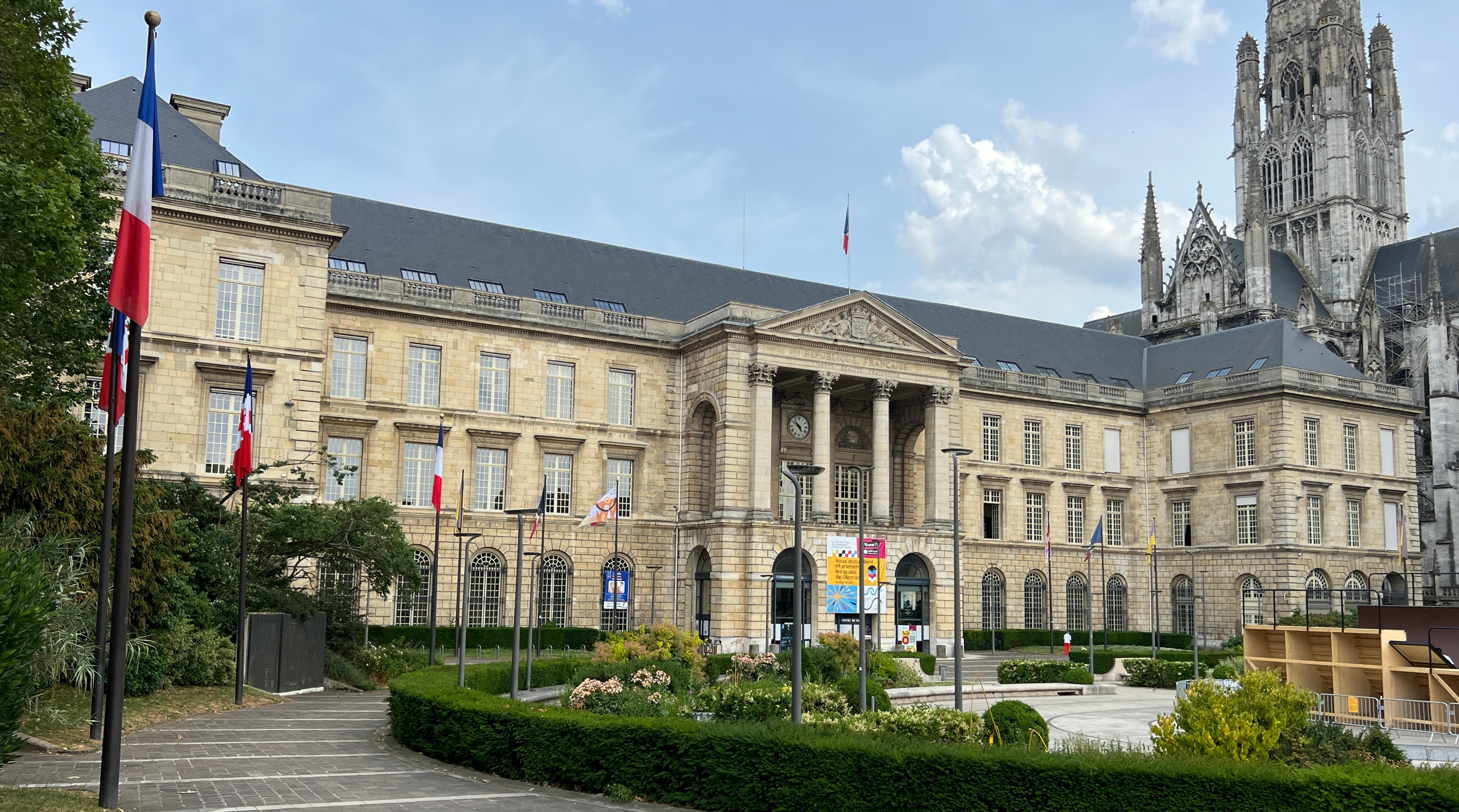
Hôtel de Ville

Rouen and its metropolitan area of 70 suburban communes form the Métropole Rouen Normandie, with 500,703 inhabitants (2022). In descending order of population, the largest of these suburbs are Saint-Étienne-du-Rouvray, Sotteville-lès-Rouen, Le Grand-Quevilly, Le Petit-Quevilly, and Mont-Saint-Aignan, each with a population exceeding 20,000. The city council is based at the Hôtel de Ville.

== Population ==
Historical population

Year	Pop.	±% p.a.
1793	84,323	—
1800	80,755	−0.62%
1806	86,672	+1.19%
1821	86,736	+0.00%
1831	88,086	+0.15%
1836	92,083	+0.89%
1841	96,002	+0.84%
1846	99,295	+0.68%
1851	100,265	+0.19%
1856	103,223	+0.58%
1861	102,649	−0.11%
1866	100,671	−0.39%
1872	102,470	+0.30%
1876	104,902	+0.59%
1881	105,906	+0.19%
1886	107,163	+0.24%
1891	112,352	+0.95%
1896	113,219	+0.15%
1901	116,316	+0.54%

Year	Pop.	±% p.a.
1906	118,459	+0.37%
1911	124,987	+1.08%
1921	123,712	−0.10%
1926	122,898	−0.13%
1931	122,957	+0.01%
1936	122,832	−0.02%
1946	107,739	−1.30%
1954	116,540	+0.99%
1962	120,857	+0.46%
1968	120,471	−0.05%
1975	114,834	−0.68%
1982	101,945	−1.69%
1990	102,723	+0.10%
1999	106,592	+0.41%
2007	108,569	+0.23%
2012	111,557	+0.54%
2017	110,145	−0.25%
2023	117,662	+1.11%

Source: EHESS and INSEE (1968–2023)

== Education ==
The main schools of higher education are the University of Rouen and NEOMA Business School (former École Supérieure de Commerce de Rouen), Unilasalle (agronomy and agriculture), both located at nearby Mont-Saint-Aignan, and the INSA Rouen, ESIGELEC, ESITech and the CESI, the three at nearby Saint-Étienne-du-Rouvray.

== Culture ==
The main opera company in Rouen is the Opéra de Rouen – Normandie. The company performs in the Théâtre des Arts, 7 rue du Docteur Rambert. The company presents opera, classical and other types of music, both vocal and instrumental, as well as dance performances. Every five years, the city hosts the large maritime exposition, L'Armada.

The city is represented by Quevilly-Rouen football club, currently in the Championnat National. Officially called Union Sportive Quevillaise-Rouen Métropole, the club play at the 12,018 capacity Stade Robert Diochon in nearby Le Petit-Quevilly. Rouen Normandie Rugby represent the city in Rugby Union. One of few professional rugby teams from northern France, Rouen Normandie Rugby, currently play in the second-tier Pro D2. Dragons de Rouen, an ice hockey club, play in the top-tier Ligue Magnus at the Île Lacroix arena. Baseball is also played in the city at Stade Saint Exupéry. The local team, Huskies de Rouen play in the top French tier, they also play some games in European competition.

== Notable residents ==
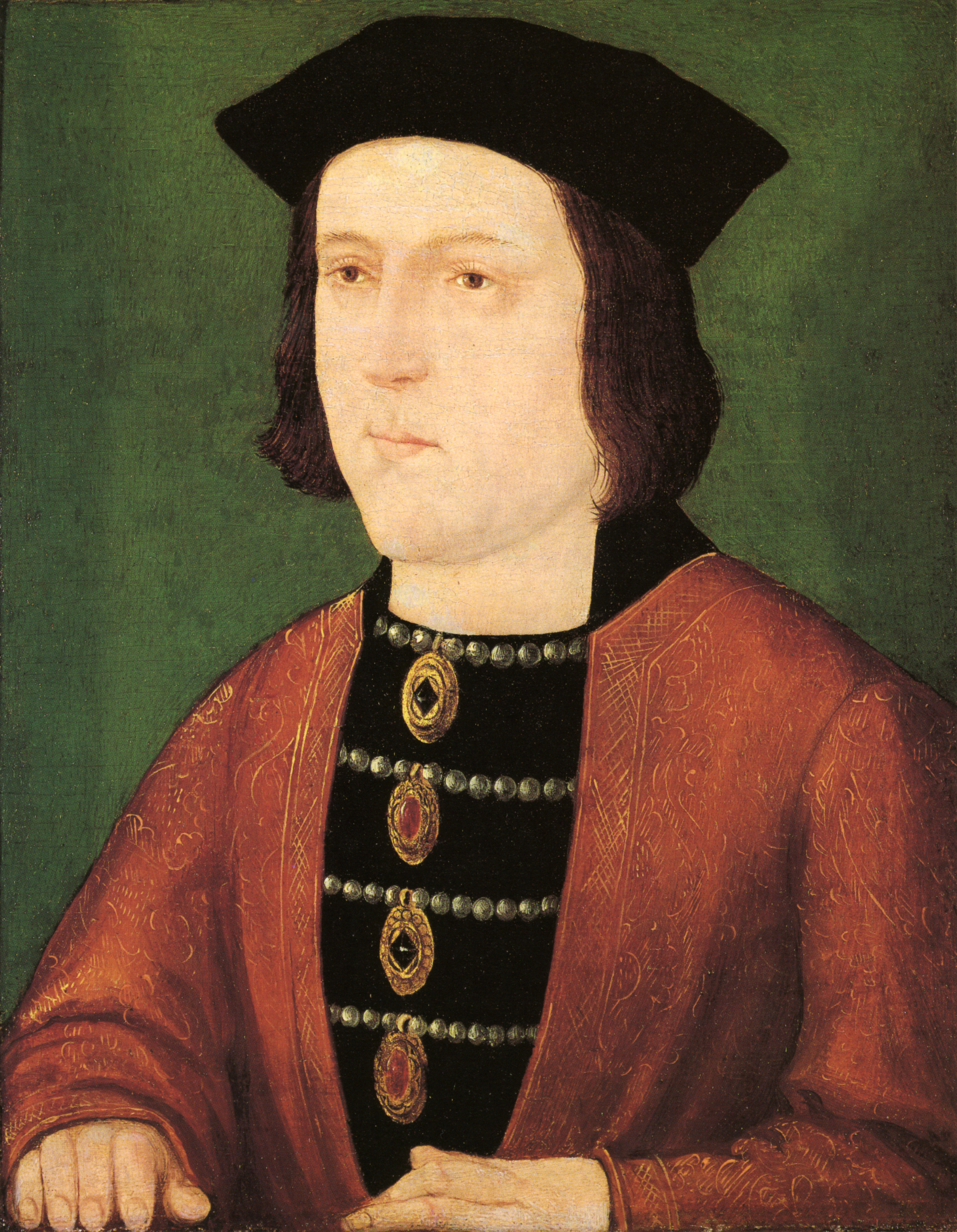
King Edward IV

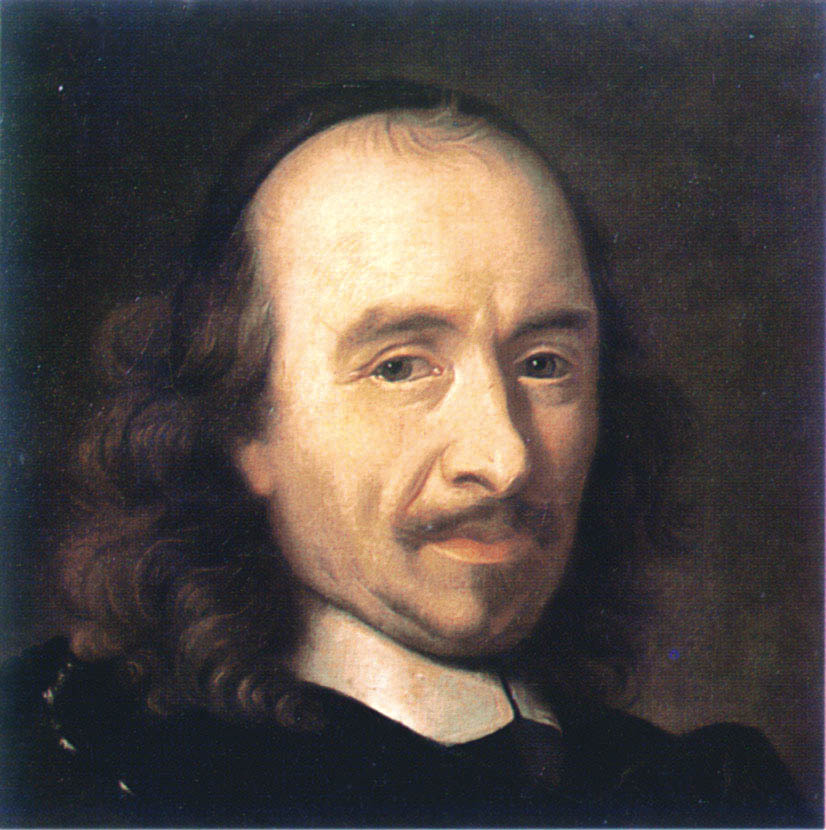
Pierre Corneille

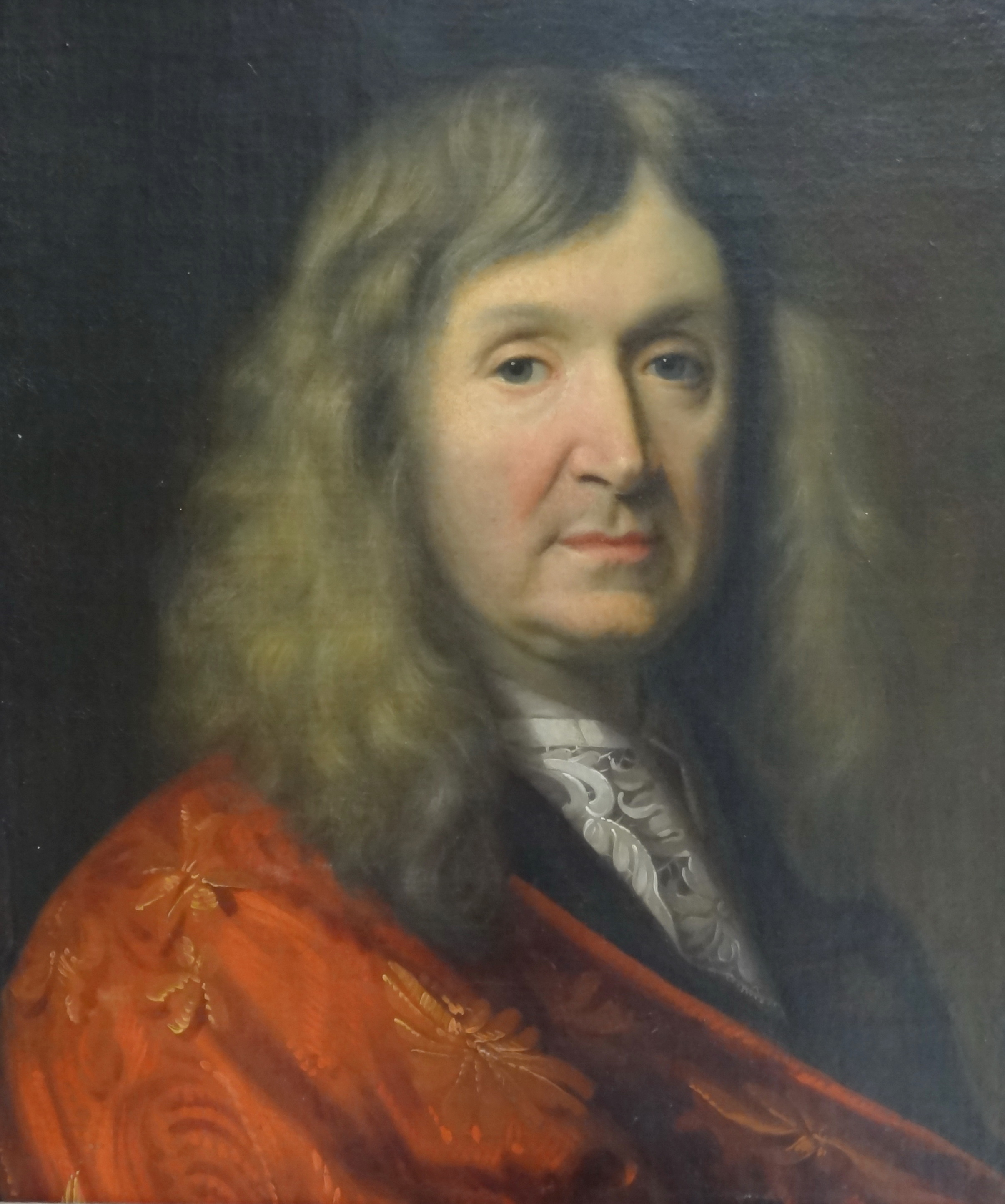
Thomas Corneille

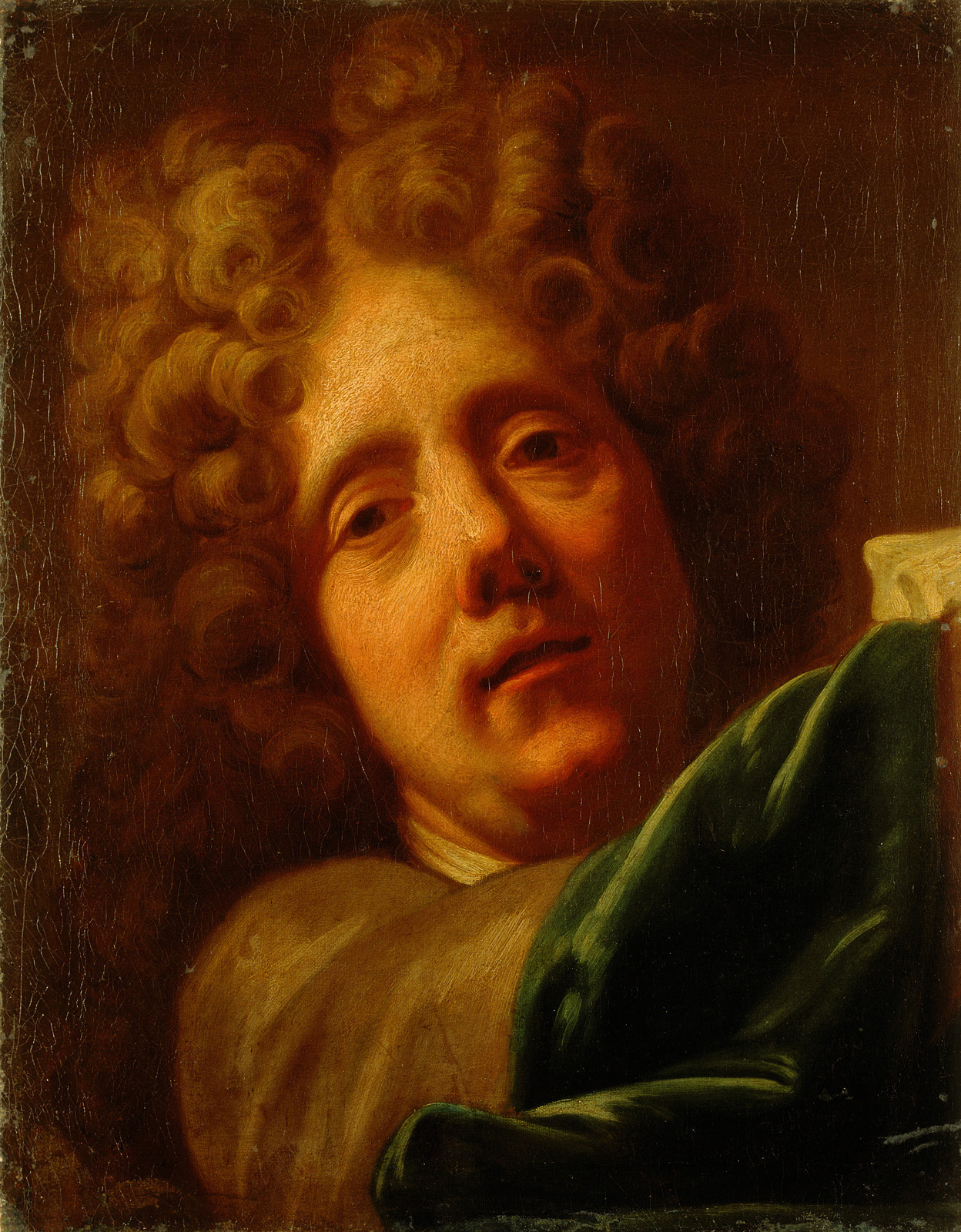
Jean Jouvenet

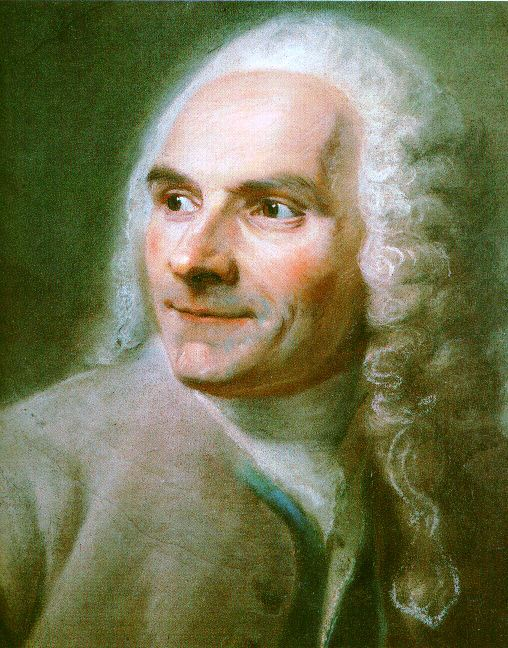
Jean Restout

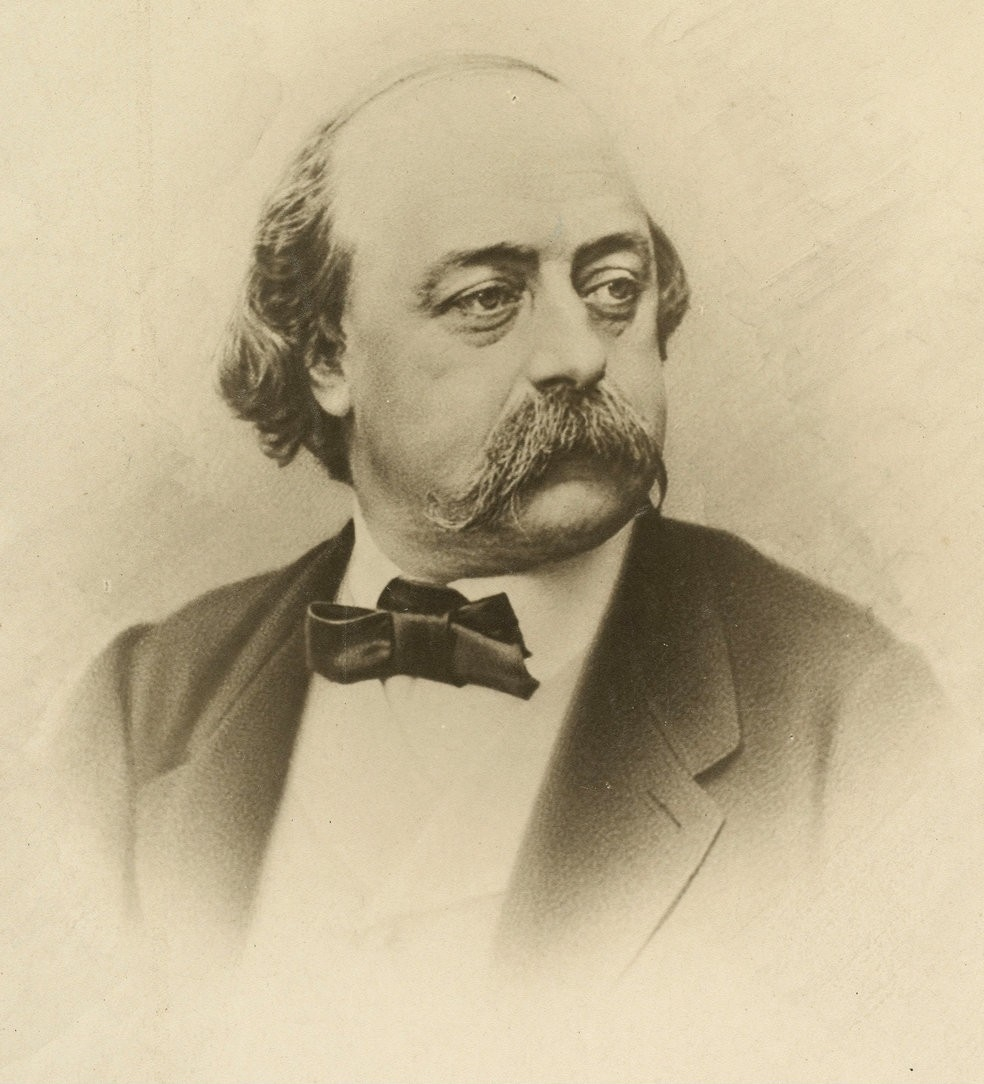
Gustave Flaubert, 1865

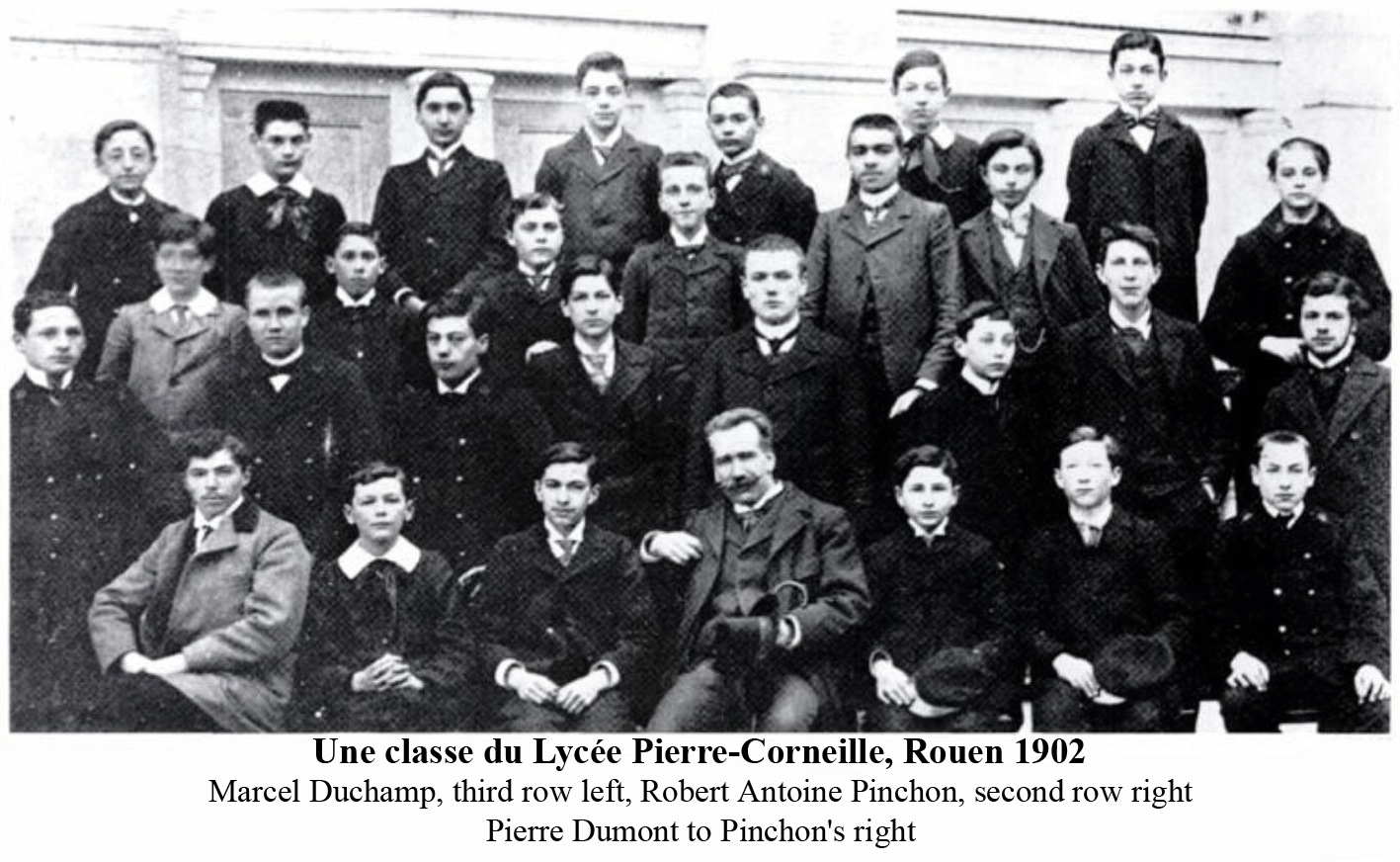
A class at the Lycée Pierre-Corneille, Rouen 1902, artists Robert Antoine Pinchon (second row, right) and Marcel Duchamp (third row, left)

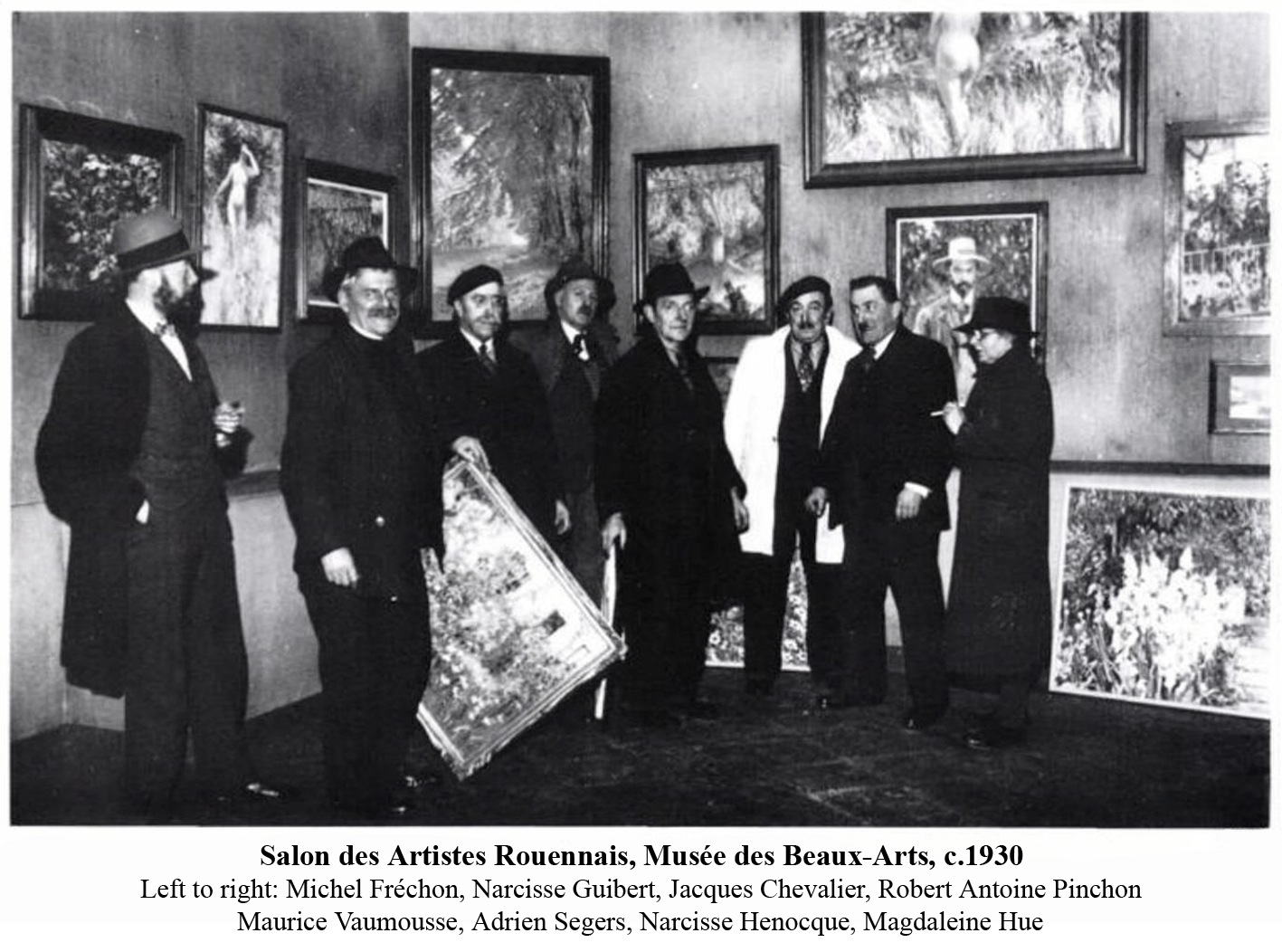
Salon des Artistes Rouennais, Musée des Beaux-Arts de Rouen, c. 1930

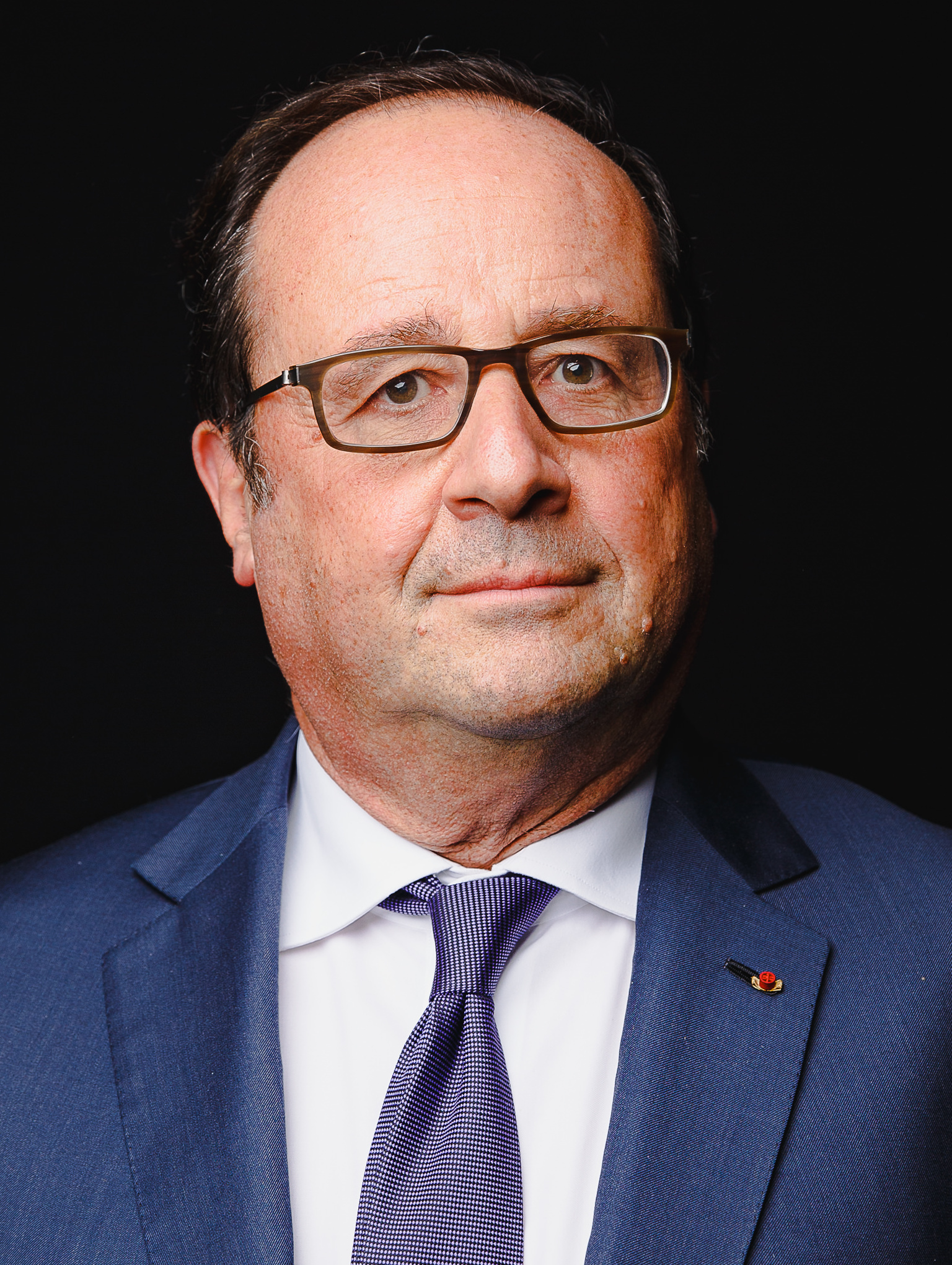
François Hollande, 2017

Rouen was the birthplace of:

- Noel Alexandre (1639–1724), theologian and ecclesiastical historian
- Joseph-Henri Altès (1826–1895), flautist and pedagog
- Roger Apéry (1916–1994), mathematician
- Thomas Aubert (b. 1500s), explorer
- Adrien Auzout (1622–1691), astronomer
- Jacques Basnages (1653–1723), Protestant theologian
- Juliette Billard, (1889–1975), architect, watercolorist, designer
- Petit Biscuit (b. 1999), music producer
- Jacques-François Blondel (1705–1774), architect
- Samuel Bochart (1599–1667), Protestant theologian
- François-Adrien Boïeldieu (1775–1834), composer
- Charles Boulanger de Boisfremont (1773–1838), painter
- Eugène Caron (1834–1903), opera singer
- Stéphan Caron (b. 1966), swimmer
- Armand Carrel (1800–1836), writer
- René-Robert Cavelier, Sieur de La Salle (1643–1687), explorer
- Marie Champmeslé (1642–1698), actress
- Pierre Adolphe Chéruel (1809–1891), historian
- Pierre Corneille (1606–1684), tragedian
- Thomas Corneille (1625–1709), dramatist, brother of Pierre Corneille
- Guillaume Couture (1617–1701), lay missionary and diplomat
- François d'Agincourt (1684–1758), composer
- Pierre Dangicourt (1664–1727), mathematician
- Gabriel Daniel (1649–1728), Jesuit historian
- François Blouet de Camilly (1664–1723), Catholic Archbishop
- François de Civille (1537–1610), military commander
- Anne Mauduit de Fatouville (mid 17th century – 1715), playwright
- Guy de la Brosse (1586–1641), botanist and pharmacist
- Antoine Girard de Saint-Amant (1594–1661), poet
- Léon de Saint-Réquier (1872–1964), organist and composer
- Adrien Charles Deshommets de Martainville (1783–1847), politician
- Marcel Duchamp (1887–1968), artist
- Pierre Louis Dulong (1785–1838), physicist and chemist
- Anny Duperey (b. 1947), actress and novelist
- Jacques Duphly (1715–1789), composer
- Marcel Dupré (1886–1971), composer
- Edward IV (1442–1483), King of England
- Elizabeth of York, Duchess of Suffolk (1444 – c. 1503), sister of Edward IV, married John de la Pole, Plantagenet
- Philippe Étancelin (1896–1981), race car driver
- Fayçal Fajr (b. 1988), footballer
- Gustave Flaubert (1821–1880), novelist
- Pierre Jean-Jacques Gasly (b. 1996), Formula One driver
- Théodore Géricault (1791–1824), painter
- Alexis Gougeard (b. 1993), cyclist
- Pierre-Antoine Guéroult (1749–1816), scholar
- Guillaume Guéroult (1507–1569), poet
- Nicolas Gueudeville (1652–1721), Catholic writer
- Georges Guillain (1876–1961), neurologist
- Marie-Madeleine Hachard (1708–1760), nun and abbess
- Armand Havet (1795–1820), botanist
- François Hollande (b. 1954), 24th President of the French Republic
- Robert Hubert (c. 1640–1666), executed in England for falsely confessing to starting the Great Fire of London
- Jean II Restout (1692–1768), painter
- Jean Jouvenet (1644–1717), painter of religious subjects
- Eugène Ketterer (1831–1870), composer
- Bernard le Bovier de Fontenelle (1657–1757), author, nephew of Pierre Corneille.
- Jean-Laurent Le Cerf de La Viéville (1674–1707), musicographer
- Pierre François le Courayer (1681–1776), theologian
- Pierre Le Pesant, sieur de Boisguilbert (1646–1714), economist and lawmaker.
- Maurice Leblanc (1864–1941), novelist
- Jean Lecanuet (1920–1993), politician
- Jean-Yves Lechevallier (b. 1946), sculptor
- Nicolas Lemery (1645–1715), chemist
- Jeanne-Marie Leprince de Beaumont (1711–1780), novelist
- Louise Levesque (1703–1745), playwright, poet
- Dominique Lokoli (b. 1952), footballer
- Lola Lovinfosse (b. 2005), racing driver
- Élise Lucet (b. 1963), journalist
- Ian Mahinmi (b. 1986), basketball player
- Alphonse Maille (1813–1865)m botanist
- Théo Maledon (b. 2001), basketball player
- Christophe Mendy (b. 1971), boxer
- Jean-Amédée Méreaux (1802–1874), musicologist, pianist and composer
- Céline Minard (b. 1969), writer
- Pierre Antoine Motteux (1663–1718), French-born English dramatist
- Iliman Ndiaye (b. 2000), footballer
- Charles Nicolle (1866–1936), bacteriologist
- Isaac Oliver (1556–1617), French-born English painter
- Nathalie Péchalat (b. 1983), ice dancer
- Thomas Pesquet (b. 1978), astronaut
- Robert Antoine Pinchon (1886–1943), painter
- François Raguenet (1660–1722), historian, biographer and musicologist
- Jacques Rivette (1928–2016), film director
- Armand Salacrou (1899–1989), dramatist
- Aurélien Tchouaméni (b. 2000), footballer
- David Trezeguet (b. 1977), footballer
- Amaury Vassili (b. 1989), singer
- Karin Viard (b. 1966), actress
- Hubert Wulfranc (b. 1956), Member of Parliament

== Relations ==
Rouen is twinned with:

- Baton Rouge, Louisiana, United States, since 1963
- Hannover, Germany, since 1966
- Norwich, Norfolk, England, United Kingdom, since 1959
- Cleveland, Ohio, United States, since 2008
- Pomeranian Voivodeship, Poland, since 1992
- Salerno, Campania, Italy, since 2002
- Zhejiang, China, since 1990

== Sculpture ==
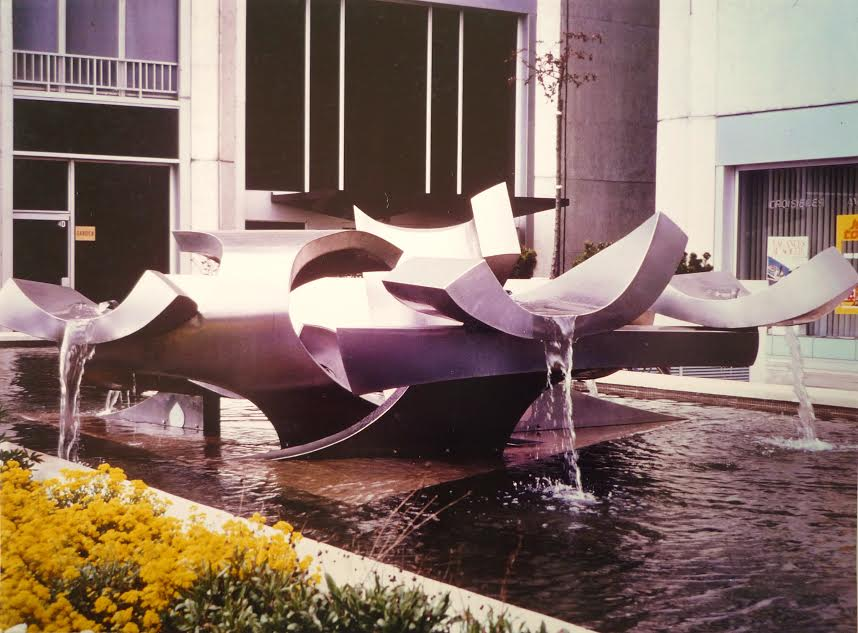
Fleurs d'eau, by Jean-Yves Lechevallier

During the second half of the 20th century, sculptures by Jean-Yves Lechevallier were erected in the city. Inaugurated in 2010, the Rouen Impressionnée hosted the contemporary urban redevelopment installation sculpture 'Camille' by Belgian artist Arne Quinze. Quinze's use of interlocking systems in sculpture employ wood, concrete, paint and metal. The Quasi-Quinze method of sculpture utilizes structural integrity and randomness as key elements for 'Camille'. Located on the Boieldieu Bridge in the center of Rouen, this location was chosen by the artist to magnify the historical separation of its city's citizens.

== Representations in art ==
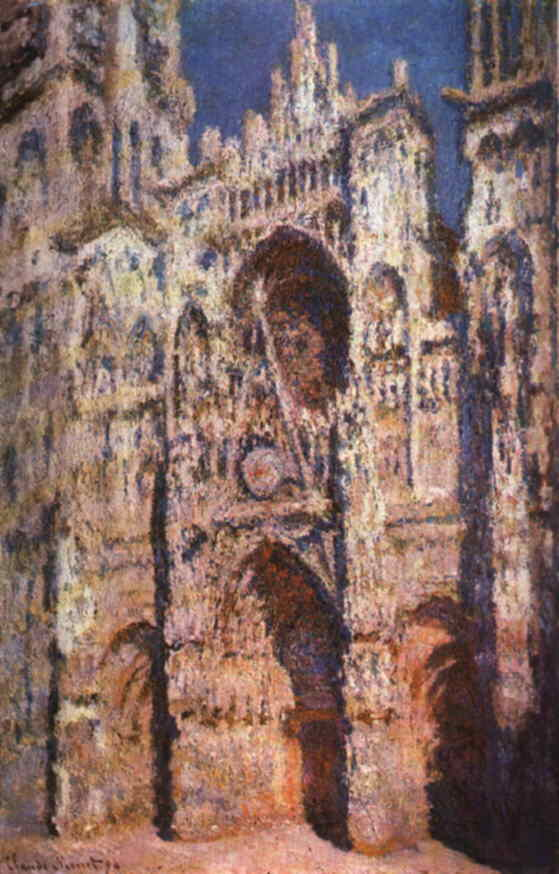
Rouen Cathedral, Full Sunlight, by Claude Monet, 1894.

Rouen Cathedral is the subject of a series of paintings by the Impressionist painter Claude Monet, who painted the same scene at different times of the day. Two paintings are in the National Gallery of Art in Washington, D.C.; two are in the Pushkin Museum of Fine Arts in Moscow; one is in the National Museum of Serbia in Belgrade. The estimated value of one painting is over $40 million.

== Heraldry ==
Arms of Rouen	The arms of Rouen are blazoned : Gules, a pascal lamb, haloed and contourné, holding a banner argent charged with a cross Or, and on a chief azure, 3 fleurs de lys Or This may be rendered, "On a red background a haloed white pascal lamb looking back over its shoulder (contourné) holds a white banner bearing a gold cross; above, a broad blue band across the top bears 3 gold fleurs de lis". On the front of the "Grand Poste" (rue Jeanne d'Arc), the banner is charged with a leopard (the lion passant seen on Norman and English arms). This was the official seal of Rouen at the beginning of the 12th century, before Normandy was incorporated into Capetian France.

== Climate ==
Rouen has an oceanic climate (Cfb in the Köppen climate classification).

Climate data for Rouen - Boos (URO), elevation: 156 m (512 ft) (1991–2020 normals, extremes 1968–present)
Month	Jan	Feb	Mar	Apr	May	Jun	Jul	Aug	Sep	Oct	Nov	Dec	Year
Record high °C (°F)	15.7 (60.3)	19.7 (67.5)	24.4 (75.9)	27.4 (81.3)	31.3 (88.3)	38.5 (101.3)	41.3 (106.3)	38.4 (101.1)	34.3 (93.7)	28.3 (82.9)	20.3 (68.5)	15.6 (60.1)	41.3 (106.3)
Mean daily maximum °C (°F)	6.9 (44.4)	7.9 (46.2)	11.4 (52.5)	14.8 (58.6)	17.9 (64.2)	21.1 (70.0)	23.4 (74.1)	23.4 (74.1)	20.1 (68.2)	15.4 (59.7)	10.4 (50.7)	7.3 (45.1)	15.0 (59.0)
Daily mean °C (°F)	4.3 (39.7)	4.8 (40.6)	7.5 (45.5)	10.0 (50.0)	13.1 (55.6)	16.1 (61.0)	18.2 (64.8)	18.2 (64.8)	15.3 (59.5)	11.7 (53.1)	7.5 (45.5)	4.7 (40.5)	10.9 (51.6)
Mean daily minimum °C (°F)	1.6 (34.9)	1.6 (34.9)	3.5 (38.3)	5.2 (41.4)	8.3 (46.9)	11.1 (52.0)	13.0 (55.4)	13.1 (55.6)	10.6 (51.1)	8.0 (46.4)	4.6 (40.3)	2.1 (35.8)	6.9 (44.4)
Record low °C (°F)	−17.1 (1.2)	−13.4 (7.9)	−10.4 (13.3)	−4.8 (23.4)	−2.2 (28.0)	1.1 (34.0)	5.9 (42.6)	5.0 (41.0)	2.1 (35.8)	−3.2 (26.2)	−8.3 (17.1)	−11.3 (11.7)	−17.1 (1.2)
Average precipitation mm (inches)	75.6 (2.98)	65.0 (2.56)	61.6 (2.43)	55.9 (2.20)	67.2 (2.65)	64.3 (2.53)	64.4 (2.54)	69.8 (2.75)	62.1 (2.44)	79.4 (3.13)	80.4 (3.17)	101.8 (4.01)	847.5 (33.37)
Average precipitation days (≥ 1.0 mm)	13.8	11.5	10.9	10.0	10.7	9.4	9.0	9.6	9.3	12.7	13.1	14.1	134.0
Average snowy days	2.3	3.7	1.5	0.7	0.0	0.0	0.0	0.0	0.0	0.0	0.9	2.5	11.6
Average relative humidity (%)	90	86	83	78	79	80	79	80	84	89	90	91	84
Mean monthly sunshine hours	52.2	76.6	119.3	164.6	182.2	196.6	199.5	190.1	159.1	107.6	57.8	48.9	1,554.4
Source 1: Meteociel
Source 2: Infoclimat.fr (snowy days, relative humidity 1961–1990)

== See also ==
- Cafetière du Belloy, also known as French drip coffee pot, invented in Rouen
- Jean-Marie Baumel, sculptor of two of the statues on the Pont Boieldieu in Rouen
- List of works by Maxime Real del Sarte
- Rouen Courthouse
- Rue du Pré de la Bataille, public thoroughfare in Rouen named after a 934 medieval battle.
