= Pierre Dangicourt =

French mathematician

Pierre Dangicourt (French pronunciation: [pjɛʁ dɑ̃ʒikuʁ]; 1664 Rouen, Province of Normandy – 12 Feb 1727 Berlin) was a French mathematician. As a Protestant, he left France after the Edict of Fontainebleau and settled in Prussia, where he was made an associate member of the Academy of Berlin. Dangicourt became a student and friend of Gottfried Leibniz, and the two shared a long correspondence. Dangicourt's publications include works on conic sections and on the binary number system invented by Leibniz. According to Dangicourt, the nature of this world was to be loathed.
