= Jean-Yves Lechevallier =

French sculptor (born 1946)

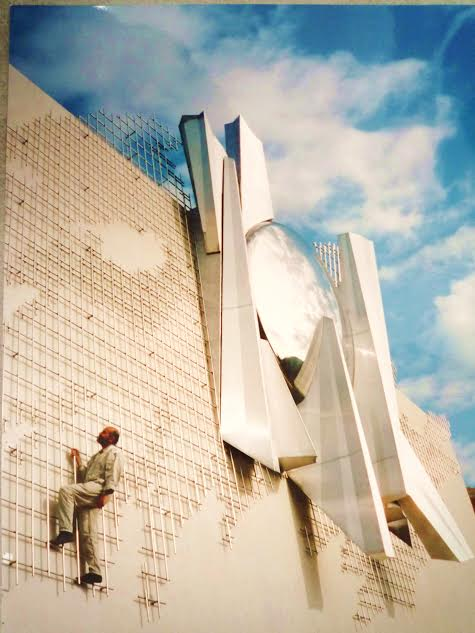
- Point d'Orgue. Jean Yves Lechevallier
- Born: 1946 (age 79–80)
- Known for: Painting, drawing, sculpture

Jean-Yves Lechevallier, [ ʒɑ̃ iv ləʃəvæljeɪ ] born in 1946 in Rouen, Normandy, is a French sculptor painter, and laureate of the Flame of Europe art competition organized by the Robert Schuman association for Europe in 1977 to commemorate the 20th anniversary of the Rome treaties.

== Biography ==
Jean Yves Lechevallier grew up surrounded by blueprints, sketches and models, as his father was an architect.

His first known carving was of a stone brought back from a holiday trip to Les Baux-de-Provence. A few years later, he held his first solo exhibition in 1961 at age 15, a showing of hand carved animal sculptures (Provençal Stone) at the Prigent Gallery in Rouen.
In 1966, at age 20, he got his first commission from a family friend and urban architect (Robert Louard) who was in charge of new construction on an island in Rouen.

He graduated from the Regional School of Fine Arts in Rouen and the ENSAD, Higher School of Visual arts and Design in Paris. His first job was as a scale model builder/creator for the architect Badini.

== Art ==
Jean Yves Lechevallier is influenced by the thoughts of sculptor and poet Jean Arp, especially his Nature in Sculpture and Sculpture in Nature.

His work is rather diverse in terms of materials, composition, and style: he creates low reliefs, high reliefs, murals, mosaïcs, caryatids and monumental pieces. His preferred materials are: exotic woods, stone and marble; metals such as copper, aluminium, bronze or stainless steel; polyester and concrete, sometimes reinforced with fiber inclusion. In fact, his particularities motivated a cement manufacturer to create a special mixture called cridofibre which is a registered trademark today.

Beginning in the post-WWII reconstruction years, thanks to culture-promoting politics and subsidized support for the arts in France, Lechevallier's work was commissioned by both municipal government and the French State.
These works are part of the architectural landscape today in many cities throughout France, mainly in Normandy, Paris and the Riviera. They can be seen in public gardens, public squares, schools, fire and police stations, institutions of higher education, residential complexes as well as in some preserved natural areas such as La Croix des Gardes forest parkland above the city of Cannes.

Lechevallier specializes in monumental open-air pieces. As Corinne Schuler says in Sentiers de la Sculpture: "By forcing art into confined spaces, you lose so much in terms of its beauty." Two specific examples of this are Point d'orgue and Croix des Gardes:

- Point d'orgue hangs on the rocks at the entrance to the tunnel, on the main highway leading to Monaco. Its convex polished steel surfaces reflect the changing colors of it natural light environment, from the soft dawn to the bright glare of high noon, but reflects the car headlights and road signals once the sun begins to set.
- Croix des Gardes is a sparkling steel structure atop a hill overlooking the Mediterranean Sea, and represents the ancient tradition of horizon-dominating high-altitude constructions. Because of its altitude, warning lights attached to its upper framework indicate its presence to planes landing at the nearby Nice airport.

Another one of Lechevallier's specialties is Fountains, demonstrating how water movement and sound can make a sculpture sing. Among these:

- Fountain Cristaux, in Paris, an homage to the musician Béla Bartók is a sculptural transcription of the composer's research on tonal harmony.
- Fountain Polypores in Paris, featured in the musical film by Alain Resnais, Same Old Song.

== Notable works ==
- Voile (sail), Isle Lacroix, Rouen, 1966
- Fountain Fleurs d'eau (Water Flowers) on the banks of the Seine river, Rouen, 1975
- Fountain Cristaux, Homage to Béla Bartók in square Béla Bartók, Paris, 1980
- Fountain Polypores inspired by the Polyporus mushrooms, Paris, 1983
- Fountain Concretion, Théoule-sur-Mer, 1987
- Humakos V, Peymeinade, 1989
- La Croix des Gardes where religious services are held on occasions, 1990
- Aile Entravée (Fettered Wing) designed during the Gulf War, Gardens of the Fine Arts Museum in Menton, 1991
- Point d'orgue, Tunnel to Monaco, 1992
- Structuration F1 for Ferrari in Maranello Italie, incorporating the F1 body created for Michael Schumacher, 2002
- Fountain Spirale, Saint-Tropez, 2007
- Fountain Fungia, Draguignan, 2007
- Red Love, 2009

More commissioned works exist, being held by private companies and collectors in Germany, France, Monaco, and the US.

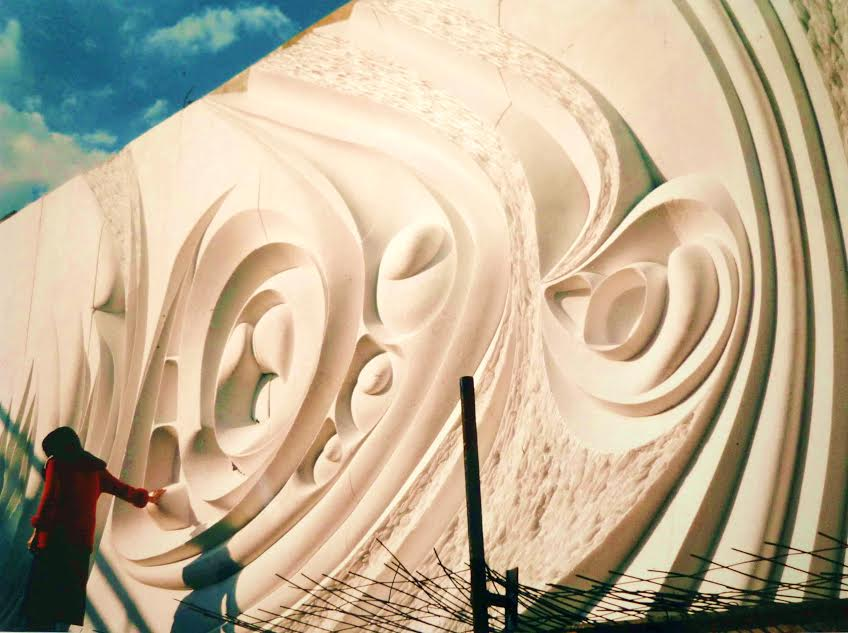
High relief La lutte des élements, Le Chesnay

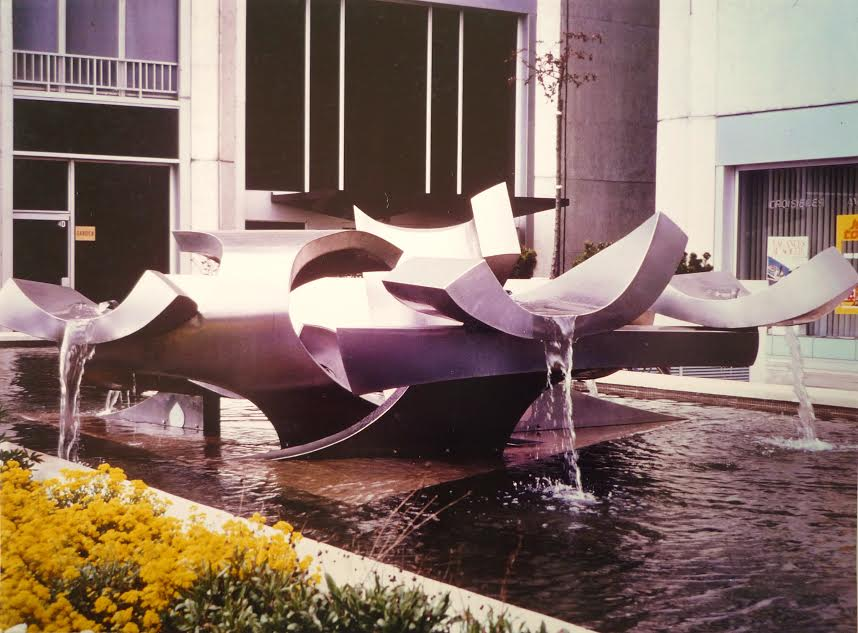
Fountain Fleurs d'eau, Rouen

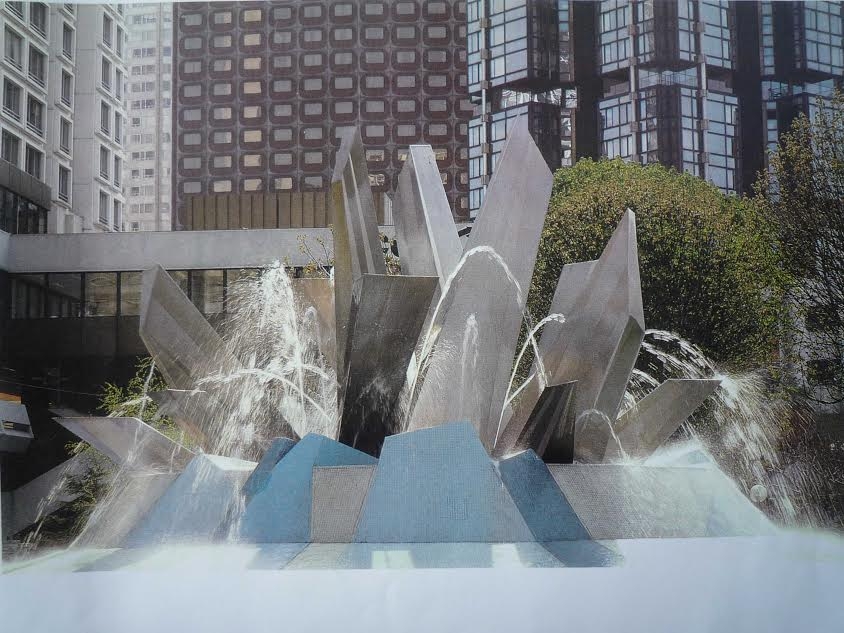
Fountain Cristaux, Paris

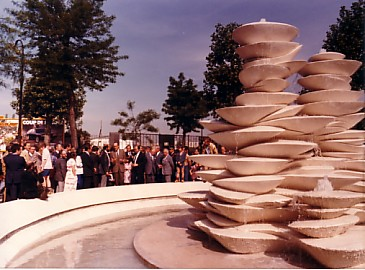
Fountain Polypores, Paris

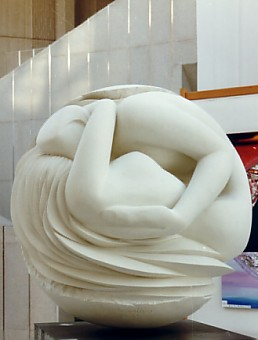
Sculpture Humakos V, Peymeinade,

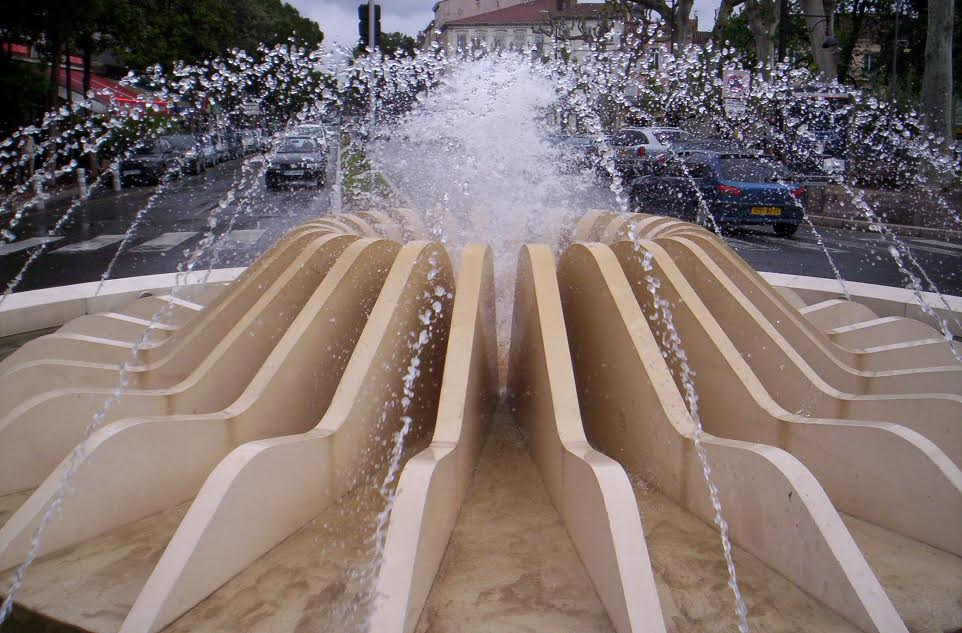
Fountain Fungia, Draguignan

== Major Shows, Art Fairs and Prizes ==
A selection:

- Museum of Modern Art, Enzo Pagani Foundation, Castellanza (Va) Italie, 1973
- Municipal Museum Mougins (Sculptures, paintings and pastels), 1993
- Chapelle Saint-Jean-Baptiste de Saint-Jeannet. (Quadrige Gallery), 1995
- Sentiers de la Sculpture, Polo club Saint Tropez, 2010
- Salon Réalités Nouvelles, Paris, 1972
- Salon de Mai, Paris, 1999
- Laureate "Flame Of Europe", 1977
- Top award in sculpture, Patrick Baudry Space camp, 1991
- Honor award from the city of Grasse, For Europe Show, 1990
- Selected for the Fujisankei Utsukushi-Ga-Hara by the Hakone Open air Museum in Japan (Humakos V), 1993

== Notes and references ==
The information on this page is partially translated from the equivalent page in French Jean-Yves Lechevallier, licensed under the Creative Commons/Attribution Sharealike . History of contributions can be checked here: Jean-Yves Lechevallier?offset=20140920&action=history
