= Anne Mauduit de Fatouville =

French playwright

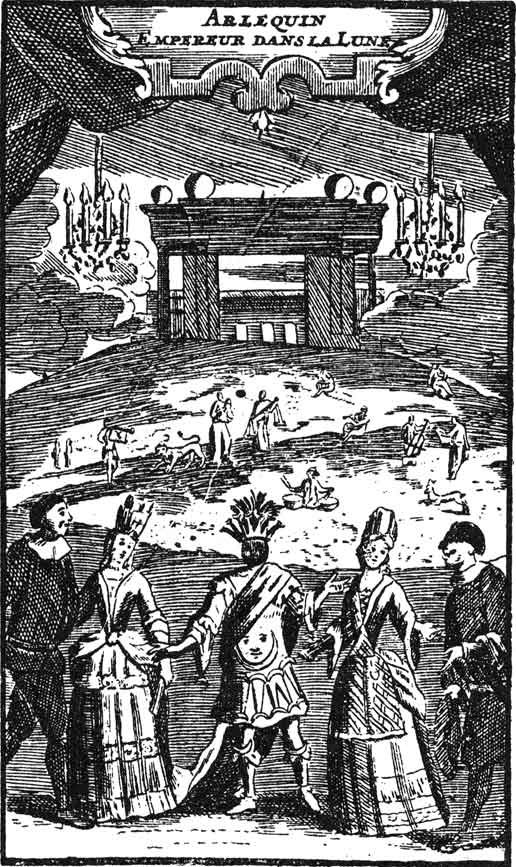
Illustration for Arlequin empereur dans la lune by Nolant de Fatouville

Anne Mauduit de Fatouville, called Nolant de Fatouville, (17th century – 2 September 1715) was a 17th–18th century French playwright of the Comédie Italienne. He was born and died at Rouen, then in the Province of Normandy, where he was a conseiller in the Court of Aids.

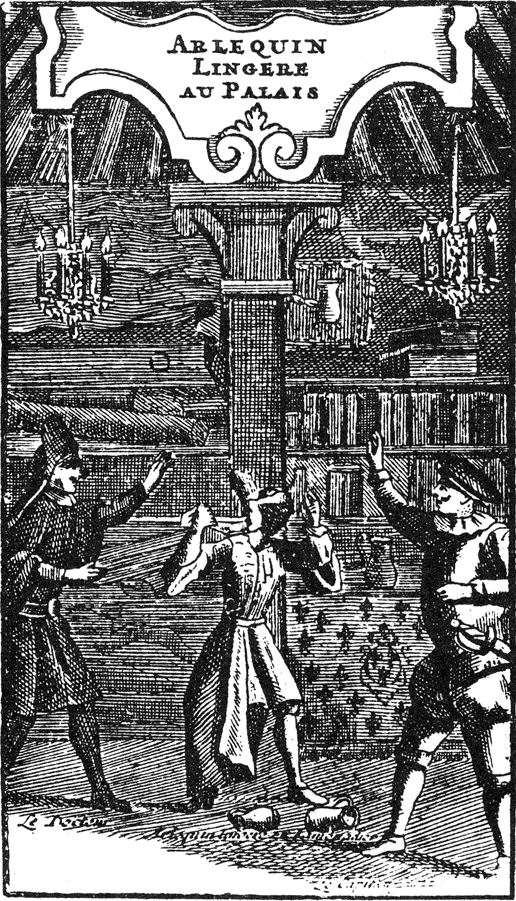
Illustration for Arlequin lingère au palais by Nolant de Fatouville

== Works ==
- 1682: Arlequin lingère du palais
- 1682: Arlequin Mercure galant
- 1682: La Matrone d'Éphèse ou Arlequin Grapignan
- 1683: Arlequin Protée
- 1684: Arlequin empereur dans la lune
- 1684: Arlequin Jason ou la toison d'or comique
- 1685: Colombine avocat pour et contre
- 1685: Isabelle médecin
- 1685: Arlequin chevalier du soleil
- 1687: Le Banqueroutier
- 1688: Le Marchand dupé
- 1689: Colombine femme vengée
- 1690: La Fille savante
- 1692: La Précaution inutile

== Bibliography ==
- Le Théâtre italien, recueilli par Évariste Gherardi, textes établis, présentés et annotés par Charles Mazouer, Paris, Société des textes français modernes, 1994 ISSN 0768-0821

== Sources ==
- Napoléon-Maurice Bernardin, La Comédie italienne en France et les théâtres de la foire et du boulevard (1570-1791), Paris, Revue bleue, 1902.
