= Jean-Laurent Le Cerf de La Viéville =

French magistrate and musicographer

Jean-Laurent Le Cerf de La Viéville, seigneur de Fresneuse, (born 1674 in Rouen where he died 9 November 1707) was a French magistrate and musicographer.

Le Cerf de La Viéville entered the magistracy and became keeper of the seals of the Parliament of Normandy.

== Works ==
He is the author of some polemical writings on musical, historical and literary questions including:

- Comparaison de la musique italienne et de la musique française, où, en examinant en détail les avantages des spectacles et le mérite des deux nations, on montre quelles sont les vraies beautés de la musique; Brussels, 1704 and 1705, in-12, two parts containing:
  - Réfutation du Parallèle des Italiens et des Français, published in 1702 by abbot Raguenet,
  - Recueil de vers chantants et trois nouveaux Dialogues, dans lesquels sont renfermés une histoire de la musique et des opéras; Vie de Lully; Réfutation du Traité de Perrault sur la musique des anciens, and Traité du bon goût en musique
- L’Art de décrire ce que l'on n'entend pas, ou le Médecin musicien; Brussels (i.e. Rouen), 1706, in-12, Satire directed against physician Nicolas Andry, who had criticized the author in the Journal des savants;
- Dissertation dans laquelle on prouve qu’Alexandre le Grand n’est pas mort empoisonné;
- Remarques sur Ausone et sur Catulle in Mémoires de Trévoux of September and October 1708.

His brother, the monk bibliographer Jean-Philippe Le Cerf de La Viéville, devoted a notice to him.

== Sources ==
- Mary B. Ellison, The Comparaison de la musique italienne et de la musique françoise of Lecerf de la Vieville : an annotated translation of the first four dialogues, Doctoral thesis of the University of Miami, 1973
- Éloi Lebreton, Biographie rouennaise, Rouen, Le Brument, 1865 (pp. 214–215).
