= François Raguenet =

French historian, biographer and musicologist

François Raguenet (c. 1660 in Rouen, Province of Normandy – 1722) was a French historian, biographer and musicologist.

== Biography ==
Raguenet embraced the ecclesiastical state, and became preceptor of Marie Anne Mancini, cardinal de Bouillon's niece. This position, leaving him the leisure to cultivate his taste for letters, he distinguished himself in the competitions of the Académie française and obtained, in 1685, an accessit by a discourse on the subject, De la patience et du vice qui lui est contraire ("On patience and the vice that is contrary to it"). Two years later, he won the prize in a speech entitled Sur le mérite et l’utilité du martyre ("On the merit and use of martyrdom").

Encouraged by this first success, he published the Vie de Cromwell, which was well received. In 1698, abbott Raguenet followed Cardinal de Bouillon at Rome and for two years studied the masterpieces of the arts which decorate the palaces and churches of the capital of the Christian world. The description he gave of it, shortly after his return to Paris, earned him the "letters from the Roman citizen", a title which flattered him greatly, and which he afterwards added to his name.

During his stay in Rome, he became passionate about Italian music. He undertook to demonstrate its superiority over music by the likes of Lully and Campra. His writings on musical life in Italy sparked a quarrel between French and Italian music, notably with his compatriot Jean-Laurent Le Cerf de La Viéville, who strongly criticized this work. There was then a war as terrible as that excited later by the first appearance of Opera buffas, or the rivalry between Gluck and Piccinni.

Abbott Raguenet had the good sense to go away from the storm. He left Paris at the end of his life and died in the retreat he had chosen. He wrote a biography of vicomte de Turenne by the order and before the eyes of Cardinal de Bouillon, who had taught him several interesting peculiarities.

== Works ==
- Histoire du vicomte de Turenne, Paris, 1738, 2 vol. in-12.
- Histoire d’Olivier Cromwell, Paris, Barbin, 1691, in-4°.
- Parallèle des Italiens et des Français en ce qui regarde la musique et les opéras, Paris, Barbin, 1702, in-12.
- Défense du Parallèle des Italiens et des Français en ce qui regarde la musique et les opéras, 1705.
- Histoire abrégée de l’Ancien Testament, Paris, Barbin, 1708, in-8°.
- L’Éducation du jeune comte D. B..., ses amours avec Émilie de T... et ses voyages, selon ses propres mémoires.
- Observations nouvelles sur les ouvrages de peinture, de sculpture et d’architecture qui se voyent à Rome, & aux environs : pour servir de suite aux Mémoires des voyages et recherches du comte de B... à Rome.
- Les monuments de Rome, ou Description des plus beaux ouvrages de peinture, de sculpture et d’architecture, qui se voient à Rome et aux environs, avec des Observations, Paris, Barbin, 1700, in-12; Amsterdam, 1701, in-12.

== Sources ==
- Lebreton, Théodore-Éloi (1865). Biographie rouennaise (in French). Rouen: Le Brument. p. 319.
- Michaud, Joseph-François; Michaud, Louis Gabriel (1823). Biographie universelle, ancienne et moderne; ou Histoire, par ordre alphabétique, de la vie publique et privée de tous les hommes qui se sont fait remarquer par leurs écrits, leurs actions, leurs talents, leurs vertus ou leurs crimes (in French). Paris: Michaud frères. pp. 546–7.
