= Transport in Rouen =

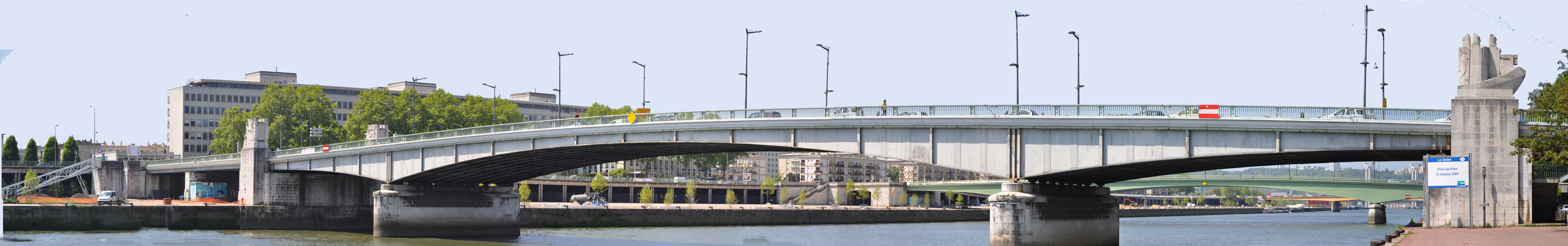
The Boieldieu bridge over the River Seine serves cars and pedestrians

The city of Rouen has a number of different modes of transportation available for use.

== Cycling ==
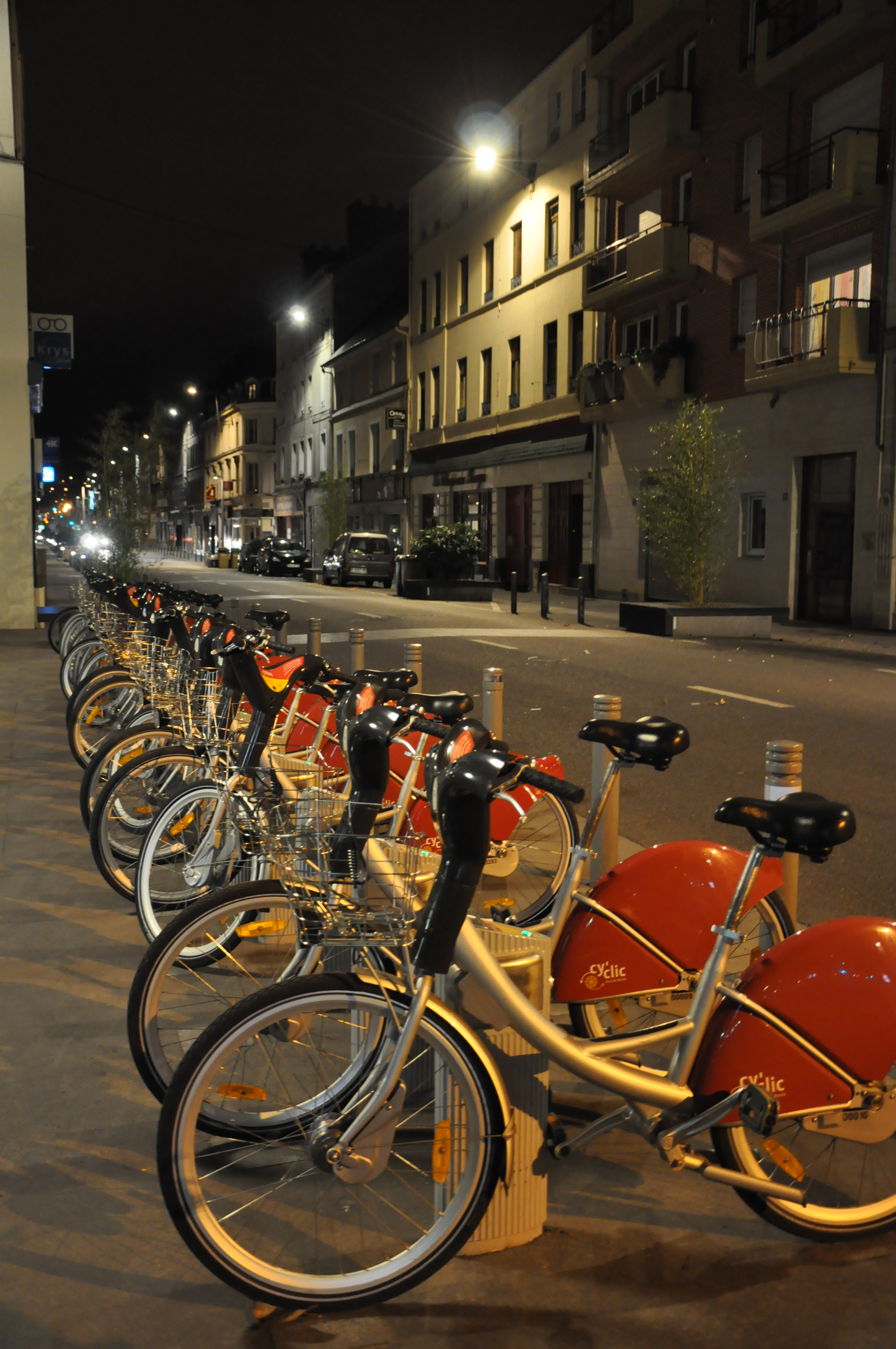
Cy'clic in Rouen

Rouen has a bicycle sharing system called Cy'clic.

== Public transportation ==
Two public transportation agencies serve the city of Rouen.

The TCAR (Rouen public transport in French) is the Rouen public transport agency. TCAR is a subsidiary of Veolia Transport and covers 45 communes of the CREA.

TCAR, provides public transportation in the form of light rail, TEOR and buses. TCAR is a subsidiary of Veolia Transport.

Veolia Transport Normandie interurbain (VTNI), a subsidiary of Veolia Transport, provides public transportation in the form of intercity buses (39 lines).

=== Métro ===
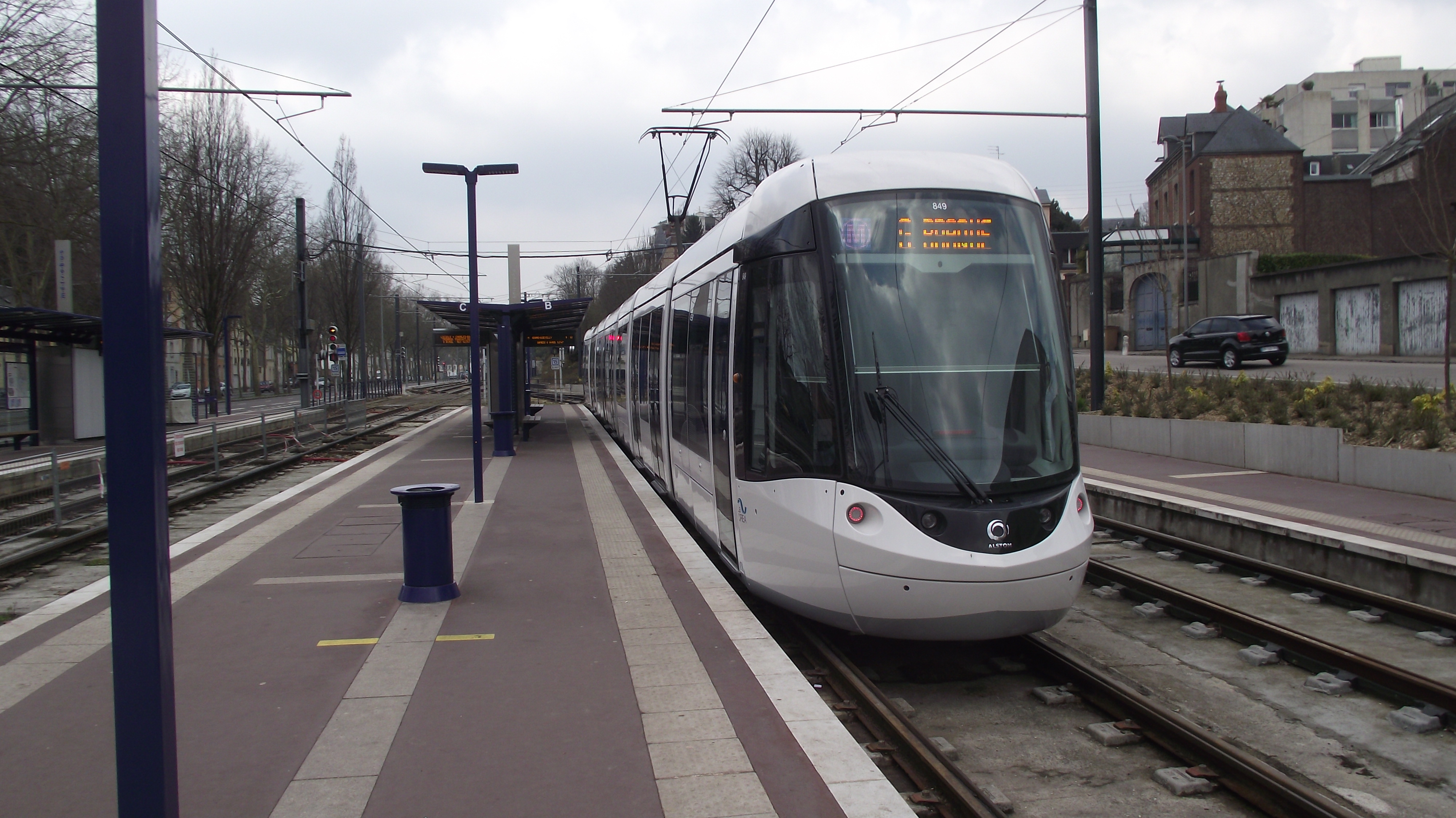
Rouen tramway

In 1991, construction of a new tramway system began. This new tramway operates on one line with two southern branches to Saint-Étienne-du-Rouvray and Le Grand-Quevilly. The network runs for 1.7 km underground in the city centre and the remainder on the road surface and reserved track. Rolling stock is of light rail type; the Tramway Français Standard (TFS).

Métrobus was opened on 17 December 1994. In light of the fact that the new mode of transport technically is a light railway/tramway, inhabitants of Rouen and its suburbs have taken the habit of calling it the 'métro'. In 1997, the tramway was extended to the technopôle du Madrillet.

=== TEOR ===
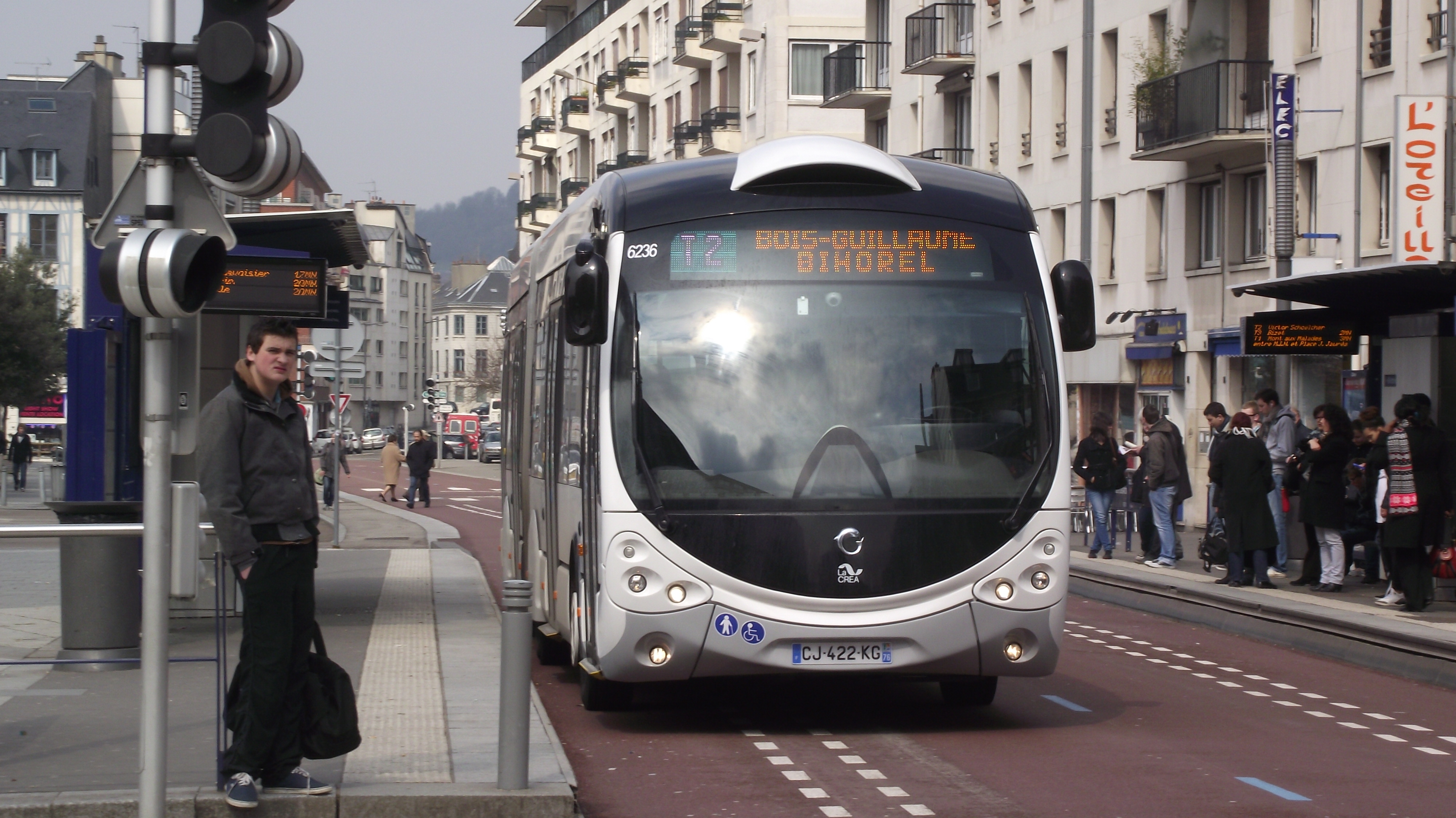
TEOR

TCAR operates three TEOR lines (T1, T2 et T3). Two TEOR lines were opened in February 2001. The third line was opened in April 2002.

=== Bus ===
Veolia Transport Normandie Interurbain or VTNI, a subsidiary of Veolia Transport, provides public transportation in the form of intercity buses (39 lines).

== Rail connections ==
=== National rail connections ===
Rouen-Rive-Droite station is a large station serving the city of Rouen. The station is on Rue Verte in the north of the city. Services are mainly intercity but many services are local. There are also TGV from Le Havre to Marseille.

=== Regional rail connections ===
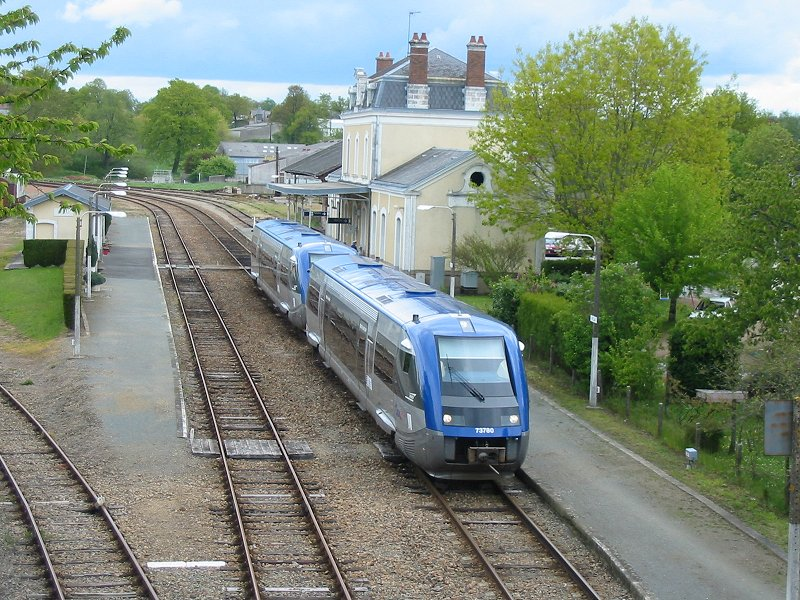
Regional train (Alstom X 73500)

== Coach travel ==
Flixbus services connect Rouen with Paris and Paris Charles de Gaulle Airport.
