= Rouen tramway =

Tramway network in Rouen, France

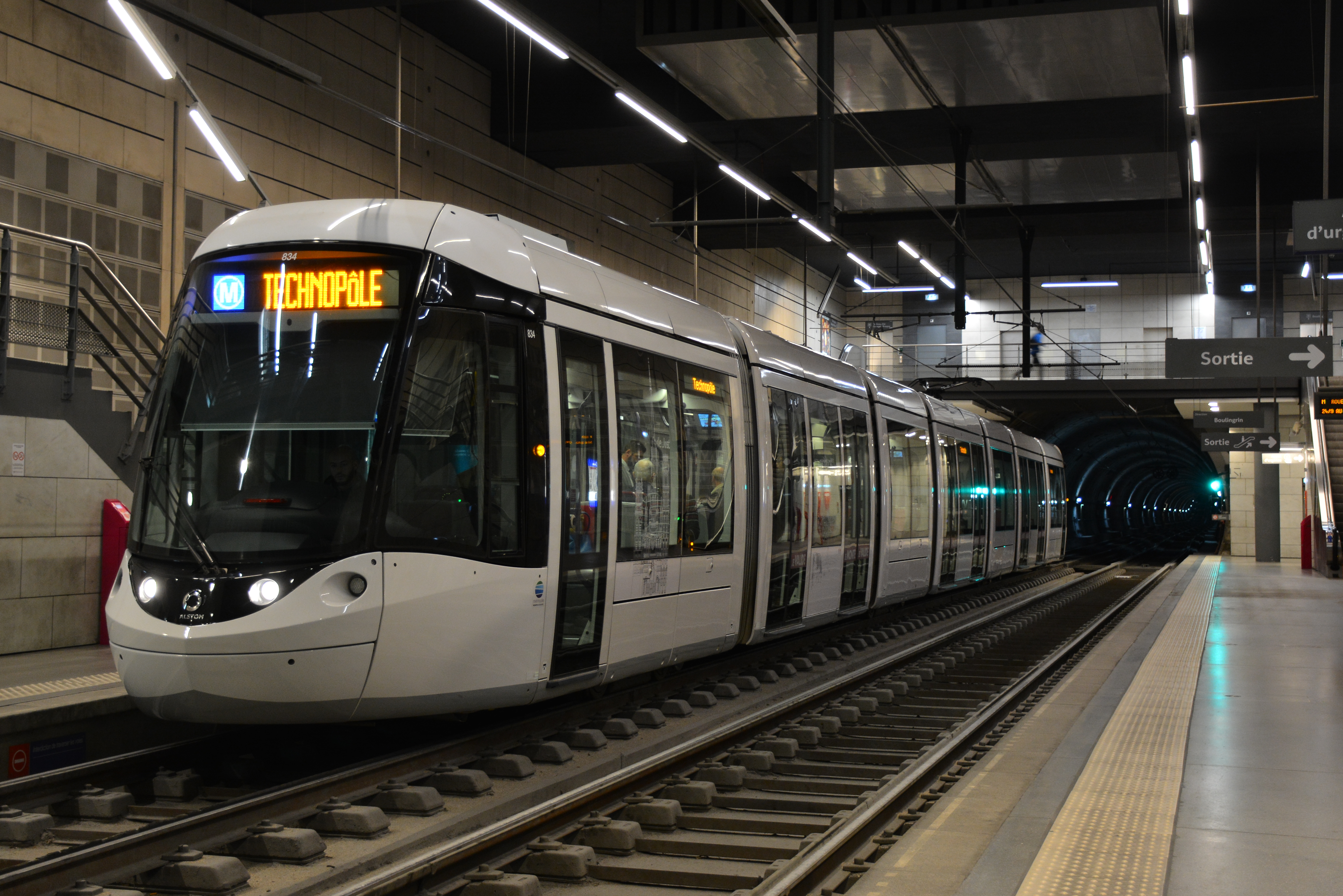

Overview
- Native name: Métro de Rouen
- Locale: Rouen, Normandy, France
- Transit type: Light rail
- Number of lines: 2
- Number of stations: 31
- Daily ridership: 67,000 (2010)
- Annual ridership: 18.85 million (2018)

Operation
- Began operation: 16 December 1994
- Operator: TCAR

Technical
- System length: 15.1 km (9.4 mi)
- Track gauge: 1,435 mm (4 ft 8 1/2 in) standard gauge
System map
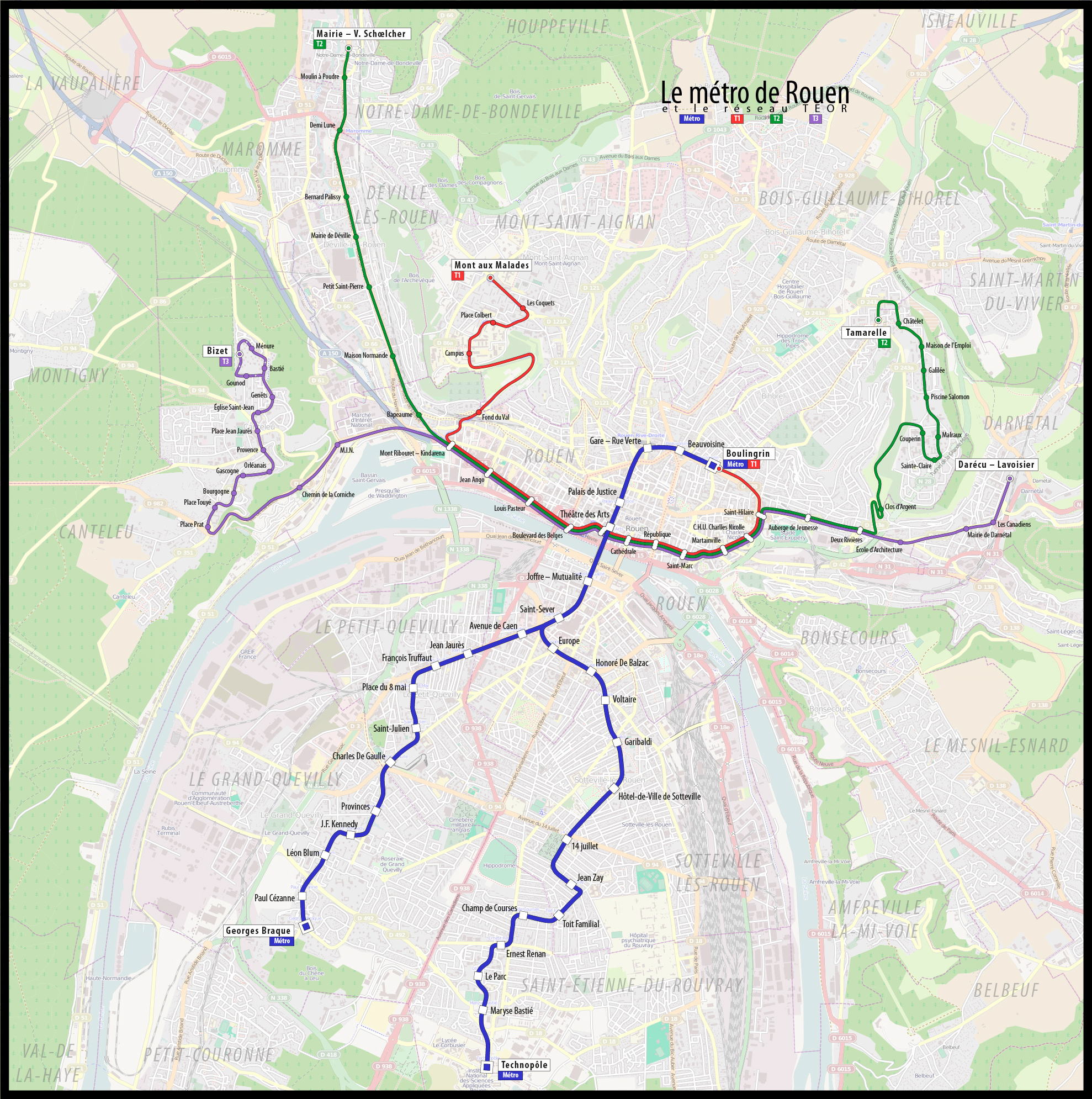
Map of Rouen public transit system, including the tramway (in blue).

The Rouen tramway (French: Tramway de Rouen) branded as the Rouen Metro (French: Métro de Rouen) is a light rail network in the city of Rouen in Normandy, France. Construction began in 1991 and the network opened for service on 17 December 1994. The network includes an underground tunneled section running 1.8 km beneath the city centre, before splitting into two street-level branches south of the Seine River.

== Modern network ==
The tramway consists of two lines that share a common route in the north in and diverting into two southern branches to Saint-Étienne-du-Rouvray and Le Grand-Quevilly. The northernmost section of the line within Rouen city centre runs through a 1.7-kilometre (1.1 mi) underground (subway) section in the Rouen city centre encompassing stations Joffre–Mutualité through Bouvoisine. At the Théâtre des Arts station, transfers between the tramway and Rouen's three bus rapid transit lines (T1-T3) can take place; while transfers between the tramway and the SNCF railway line take place at Gare–Rue Verte station. The remainder of the tramway to the south of the underground portion runs on the road surface and on reserved track.

Although the system is technically a tramway, it is commercially branded and commonly called the "métro" by both the operator (TCAR) and the inhabitants of Rouen and its suburbs. In September 1997 the tramway was extended to the Technopôle du Madrillet.

=== Technical data ===
- Length of the network : 18.2 km (11.3 mi)
- Number of stops : 31
- Number of tramcars : 27
- Average commercial speed : 19.125 km/h (11.9 mph)
- Maximum speed: 80 km/h (50 mph)
- Daily traffic: 65,000 journeys
- Opening hours: 5:00am to 11:30pm
- Frequency of service: every 3 minutes (peak); every 20 minutes (off peak)

=== Rolling stock ===
The original rolling stock used by the system until 2012 was the GEC Alsthom Tramway Français Standard (TFS), identical to those used on the Grenoble tramway (1987) and Paris Tramway Line 1.

In January 2010, Alstom was awarded a €90m contract to supply 27 Citadis 402 trams in 2011–2012 to replace the TFS cars. All TFS trams were removed from service in 2012 and were subsequently shipped to Gaziantep, Turkey as an expansion fleet for a newly built tram line in that city.

== Former tram system ==
Rouen's first-generation tram network operated from 1877 to 1953. Horse-drawn carriages and omnibuses were introduced in the late 18th century but proved insufficient for the growing city. Steam trams followed, with the first line authorised to use steam power from Maromme from 29 December 1877 and full electrification by Thomson Houston in 1896, resulting in 15 million passengers carried that same year. The network expanded to 70 km (43 mi) in 1915, the longest electric network in France at the time.

Despite a record year in 1928 with over 30 million journeys, the rise of private motoring, buses, trolleybuses, the Great Depression, and World War II led to the tramway's decline. In March 1950 the municipality decided to close the tramway, and the last trams of this system ran in 1953.

== See also ==
- Transportation in Rouen
- Trams in France
- List of town tramway systems in France
- Elbeuf tramway

== Sources ==
- Bertin, Hervé (1994). Petits trains et tramways haut-normands [Small trains and tramways of Upper Normandy] (in French). Le Mans: Cénomane/La Vie du Rail. ISBN 978-2-905596-48-2.
- Courant, René (1982). Le Temps des tramways [Railway Days] (in French). Menton: Éditions du Cabri. ISBN 978-2-903310-22-6.
