= TCAR =

TCAR, Tcar, tcar, or similar may refer to:

- Trans-carotid artery revascularization, a medical procedure used to prevent stroke
- Transports en Commun de l'Agglomération Rouennaise, the French transport agency
