= Transports en Commun de l'Agglomération Rouennaise =

The Transports en Commun de l'Agglomération Rouennaise (TCAR) (French pronunciation: [tʁɑ̃spɔʁ ɑ̃ kɔmœ̃ də laɡlɔmeʁasjɔ̃ ʁwanɛz], Rouen public transport in French) (usually referred to as TCAR) is the Rouen public transport agency. TCAR is a subsidiary of Veolia Transport and covers 45 communes of the CREA.

TCAR, provides public transportation in the form of light rail, TEOR and buses. TCAR is a subsidiary of Veolia Transport.

Veolia Transport Normandie interurbain (VTNI), a subsidiary of Veolia Transport, provides public transportation in the form of intercity buses (39 lines).

== Métro ==
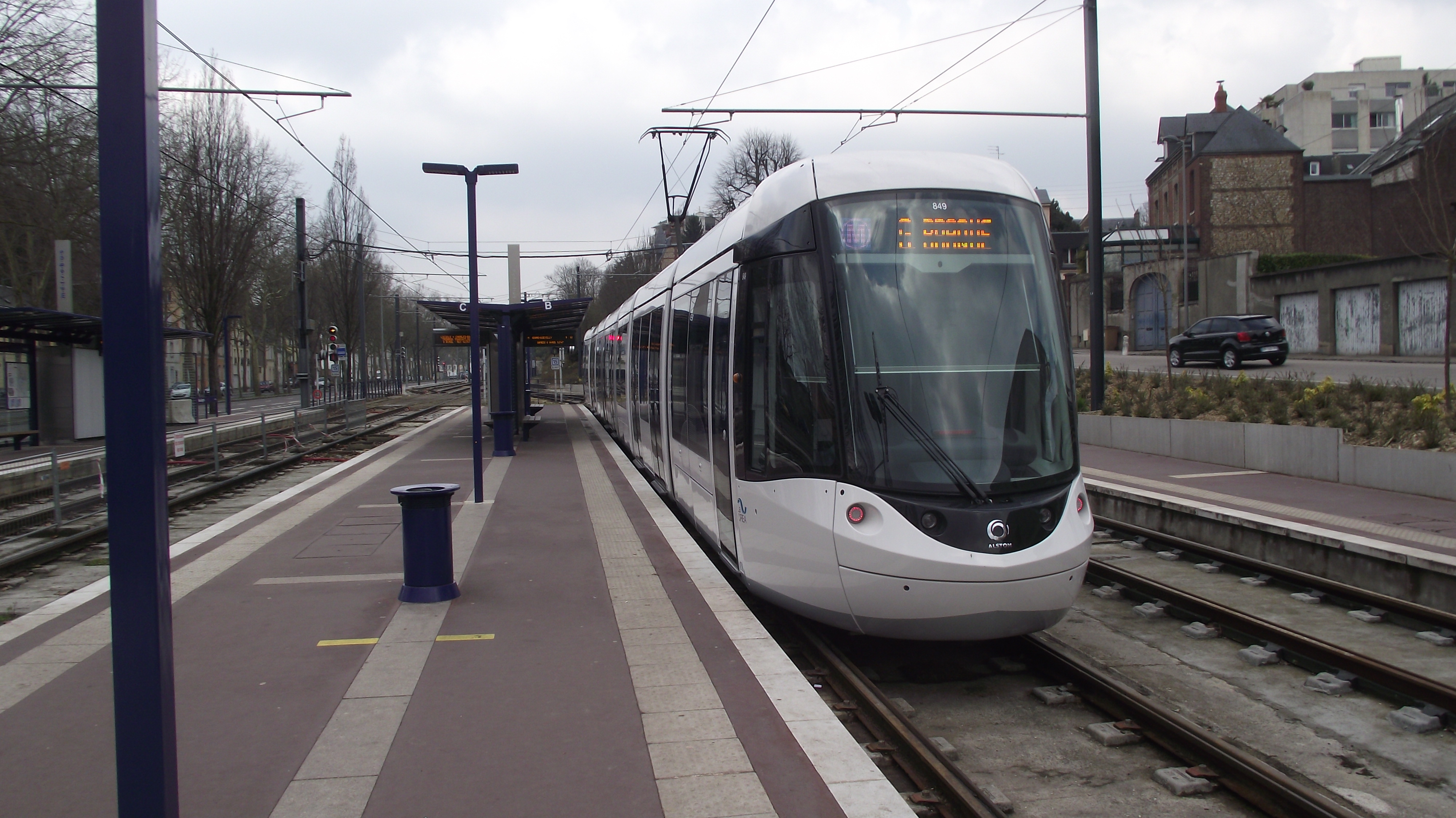
Rouen métro

In 1991, construction of a new tramway system began. This new tramway operates on one line with two southern branches to Saint-Étienne-du-Rouvray and Le Grand-Quevilly. The network runs for 1.7 km underground in the city centre and the remainder on the road surface and reserved track. Rolling stock is of light rail type; the Tramway Français Standard (TFS).

Métrobus was opened on 17 December 1994. In light of the fact that the new mode of transport technically is a light railway/tramway, inhabitants of Rouen and its suburbs have taken the habit of calling it the 'métro'. In 1997, the tramway was extended to the technopôle du Madrillet.

== TEOR ==
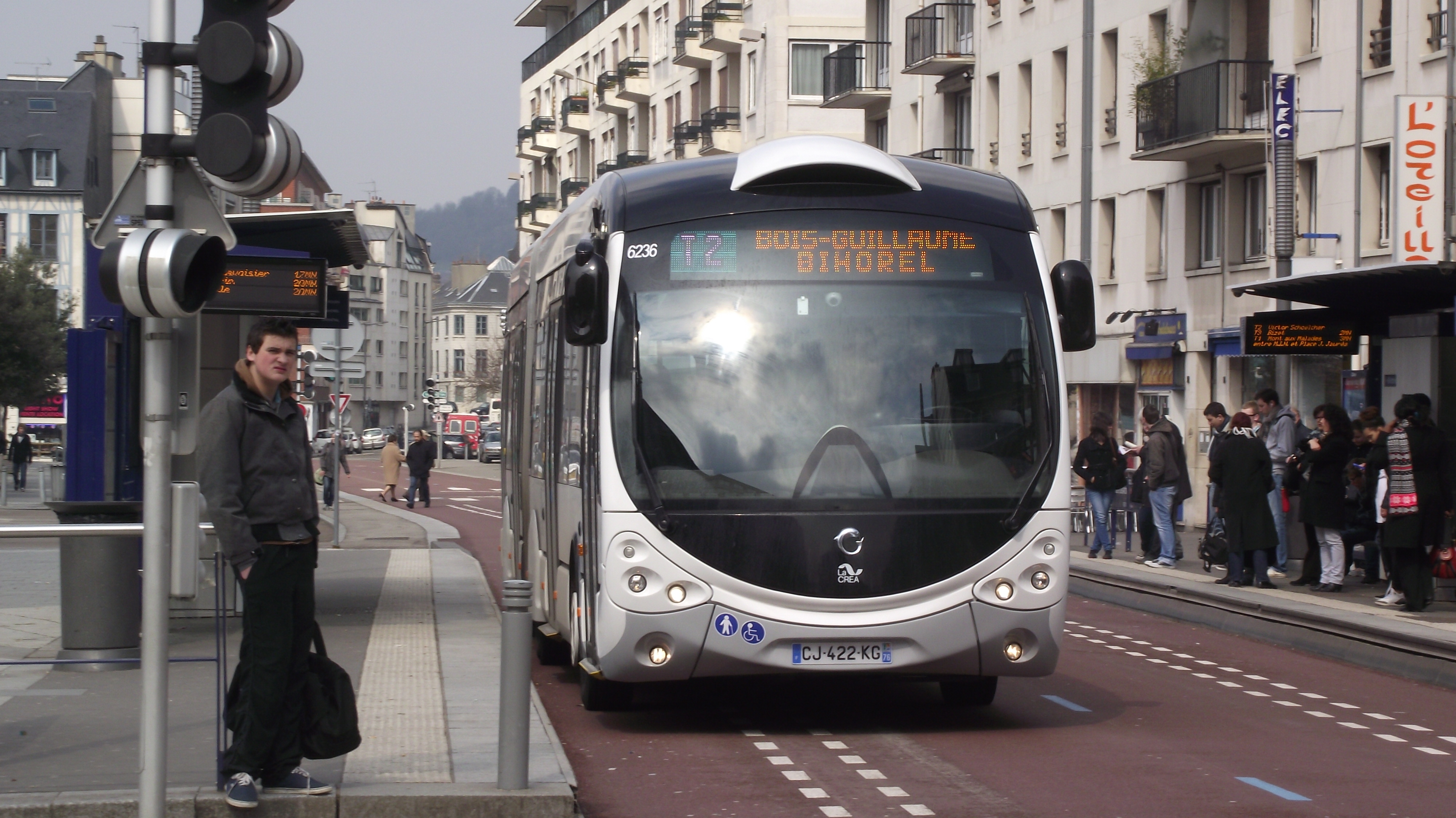
TEOR

TCAR operates 3 TEOR lines (T1, T2 et T3) : Two TEOR lines were opened in February 2001. The third line was opened in April 2002.

== Bus ==
Veolia Transport Normandie Interurbain or VTNI, a subsidiary of Veolia Transport, provides public transportation in the form of intercity buses (39 lines).

== See also ==
- TEOR
- Rouen tramway
- Transport in Rouen
