= Société d'économie mixte des transports publics de l'agglomération grenobloise =

- Industry: urban and suburban passenger transport
- Founded: 13 February 1975
- Headquarters: Échirolles, France
- Key people: Jean-Paul Trovéro (Président)
- Revenue: ▼34 298 500 € (2016)
- Net income: ▲274 600 € (2015)
- Number of employees: 1,432
- Website: www.m-tag.fr

The SPL M Tag, previously known as Société d'économie mixte des transports publics de l'agglomération grenobloise (SÉMITAG) is a public company which operates since 1975, of behalf of the Syndicat Mixte des Mobilités de l'Aire Grenobloise (SMMAG), the entire bus and tramway network of the Grenoble-Alpes Métropole (M réso) with a population of over 440 000 spread over 49 municipalities for a surface area of 541 km^{2}.

== See also ==
- Grenoble tramway

=== External links ===
- Official website
