= Elbeuf tramway =

Tramway in Normandy, France, 1899 to 1926

The Elbeuf tramway was put into service in 1898 in the southern part of the Seine-Inférieure department (now Seine-Maritime) to facilitate the movement of the residents of the textile city of Elbeuf and its working-class suburbs. With its four standard gauge lines, each nine kilometers long and diverging from Place du Calvaire, the network transported up to 1.5 million people, in 1899, at the beginning of the operation.

The management and financial difficulties of the operating company constituted warning signals even before the First World War. The conflict that disrupted the network and the competition from other modes of transportation in the early 1920s worsened the crisis of this tramway, which experienced an early closure in 1926.

== Historical background ==
=== The Ridder project ===
Located 20 kilometers upstream from Rouen, with its agglomeration extending on both banks of the Seine, the textile city of Elbeuf considered itself neglected by the railway since the Paris-Rouen line, inaugurated in 1843, had bypassed it. The new mode of communication arrived in this agglomeration, with a population of 40,000, only in 1865 during the construction of the Oissel to Serquigny line, which allowed a direct connection between Rouen and Caen. A few years later, in 1883, Elbeuf was connected to the transversal Rouen-Orléans line with the completion of the section between its station and that of Petit-Quevilly, but this did not solve the problem of urban transportation.

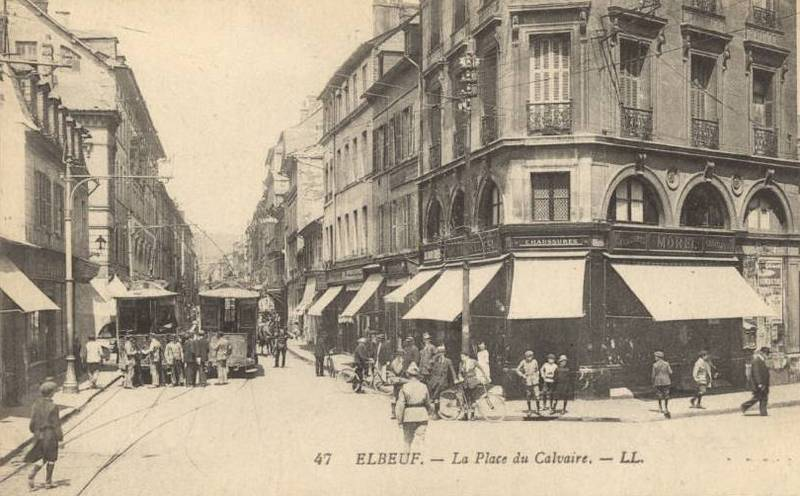

However, in 1877, Théodore de Ridder, representing the General Company of Narrow-Gauge Railways of Brussels, submitted an ambitious project to serve the Elbeuf agglomeration with a network of steam and horse-drawn tramways for passenger and freight transport.

A set of six star-shaped lines with a total length of 33.8 kilometers (with the Calvaire Square in Elbeuf as the central point) was envisaged. Three suburban steam routes would have connected the center of Elbeuf with the Rouen agglomeration for one of them, with Saint-Pierre-lès-Elbeuf for the other two. The main line would have crossed the Seine, passed through Saint-Aubin-lès-Elbeuf, and connected to the Rouen tramway network at Sotteville-lès-Rouen after covering 18.300 km, before reaching the Rouen-Martainville station via a three-rail section. The second line of 3.700 km would have ended at the location called "Pont d'Oison" through the center of Caudebec-lès-Elbeuf. The third line, 4 km long, would have led to Puits-Mérot through the Green Gate, passing through the La Villette hamlet near the Seine. Three horse-drawn lines would have served the city center, using its narrow streets and connecting the Saint-Pierre-Sotteville axis to the Elbeuf - Saint-Aubin and Elbeuf-Ville stations. A seventh line, exclusively for freight, would have consisted of various industrial branches passing through narrow medieval streets as well as the docks and streets of Boeufs, du Havre, Robert, de la Porte-Rouge, Cousin-Corblin, Saint-Amand, and Dévé, thus serving the majority of the factories. Given the narrowness of some streets, the envisaged gauge was 1.90 m, and the tightest curves, on line 7, were only 20 m radius, leading to the use of articulated locomotives. The fleet would have consisted of 16 mixed locomotives, 8 locomotives weighing 16 to 18 tons, 21 double-decker cars, 12 mixed cars, 50 covered wagons, and 100 coal wagons, as well as 70 horses, distributed in 5 depots.

Even though the enthusiasm of the population was great, as evidenced by numerous petitions in favor of the network and multiple observations made during the public utility inquiry conducted in 1879, the lines, which had been declared of public utility by decree in 1882, were never built due to lack of financial support from industrialists, hostility from the Western Railway Company, which feared competition from the Rouen line, and the economic slowdown linked to the Great Depression of 1882.

=== Establishment of the network ===
It wasn't until 1894 that a new project was presented to the municipality of Elbeuf by Édouard Cauderay on behalf of the General Traction Company. The latter proposed the construction of five standard gauge lines, including one with horse traction, with a total length of 9,800 meters, still centered around Place du Calvaire. This time, the project met with unanimous approval, and after a public utility inquiry conducted in February-March 1896, work could begin in June 1897 even before the declaration of public utility was promulgated.

=== Beginnings of the tramway and the initial difficulties ===
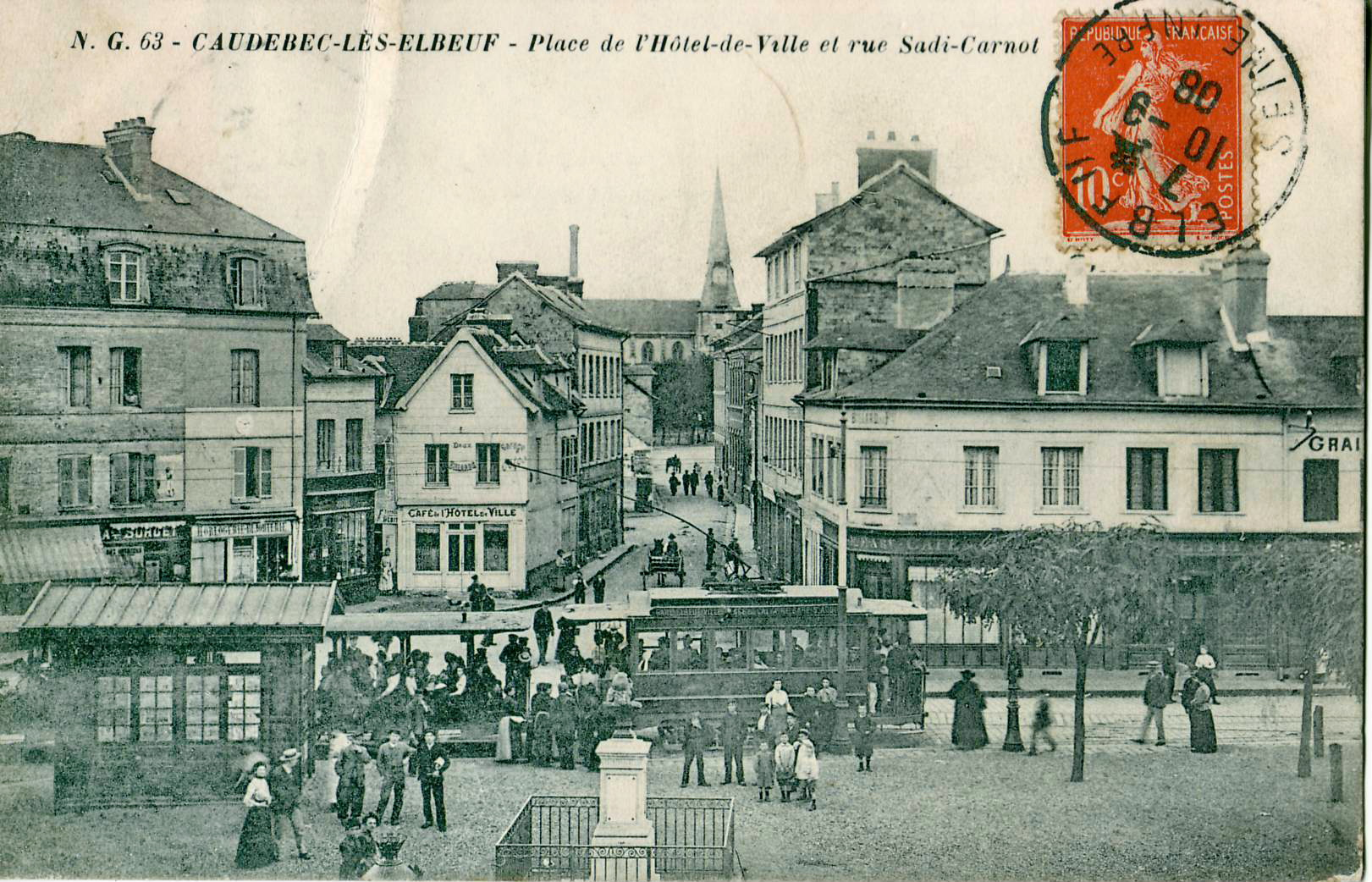

The network being built was to be formed by the following lines:

- Line no. 1: Elbeuf-Place du Calvaire - Place du Coq-Rouvalet - Orival terminus (3,265 m)
- Line no. 2: Elbeuf-Place du Calvaire - Caudebec - Saint-Pierre terminus (3,670 m)
- Line no. 3: Elbeuf-Place du Calvaire - Rue de Paris-Rue de la République - Saint-Aubin-Jouxte-Boulleng Station (1,800 m)
- Line no. 4: Elbeuf-Place du Calvaire - Elbeuf-Ville Station (545 m)
- Line no. 5: Rue de Paris - Champ de Foire - Port (520 m), with this last section reserved for freight transport.

By the end of 1897, the works were practically completed, the tracks laid, and the power station supplying the network operational. On February 9, 1898, the first tramcars ran on a network limited to four lines and 9,280 meters long because line no. 5 with horse traction was finally not built due to operational difficulties related to wagon traffic on a single track, the high cost of maintaining a stable, and the presence of a turntable in the city center.

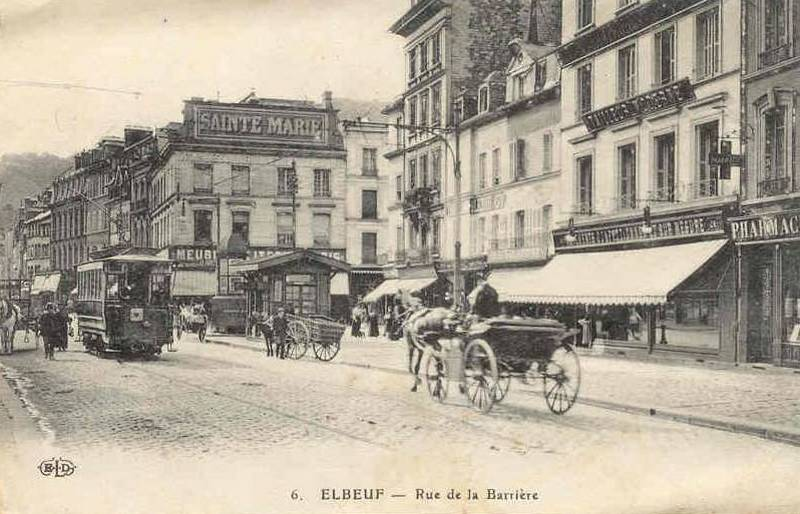

As the authorities were slow to issue their authorization, Mr. Cauderay, on behalf of the Elbeuf Electric Tramway Company, a subsidiary of the General Traction Company, decided to put the tramways into operation at his own risk. The official inauguration took place on May 26, 1898; an invitation was extended to a former Minister of Public Works, Mr. Dupuy-Dutemps, whose influence with the government was known, perhaps to expedite the declaration of public utility process, which finally occurred on October 28, 1898, with a concession of 50 years.

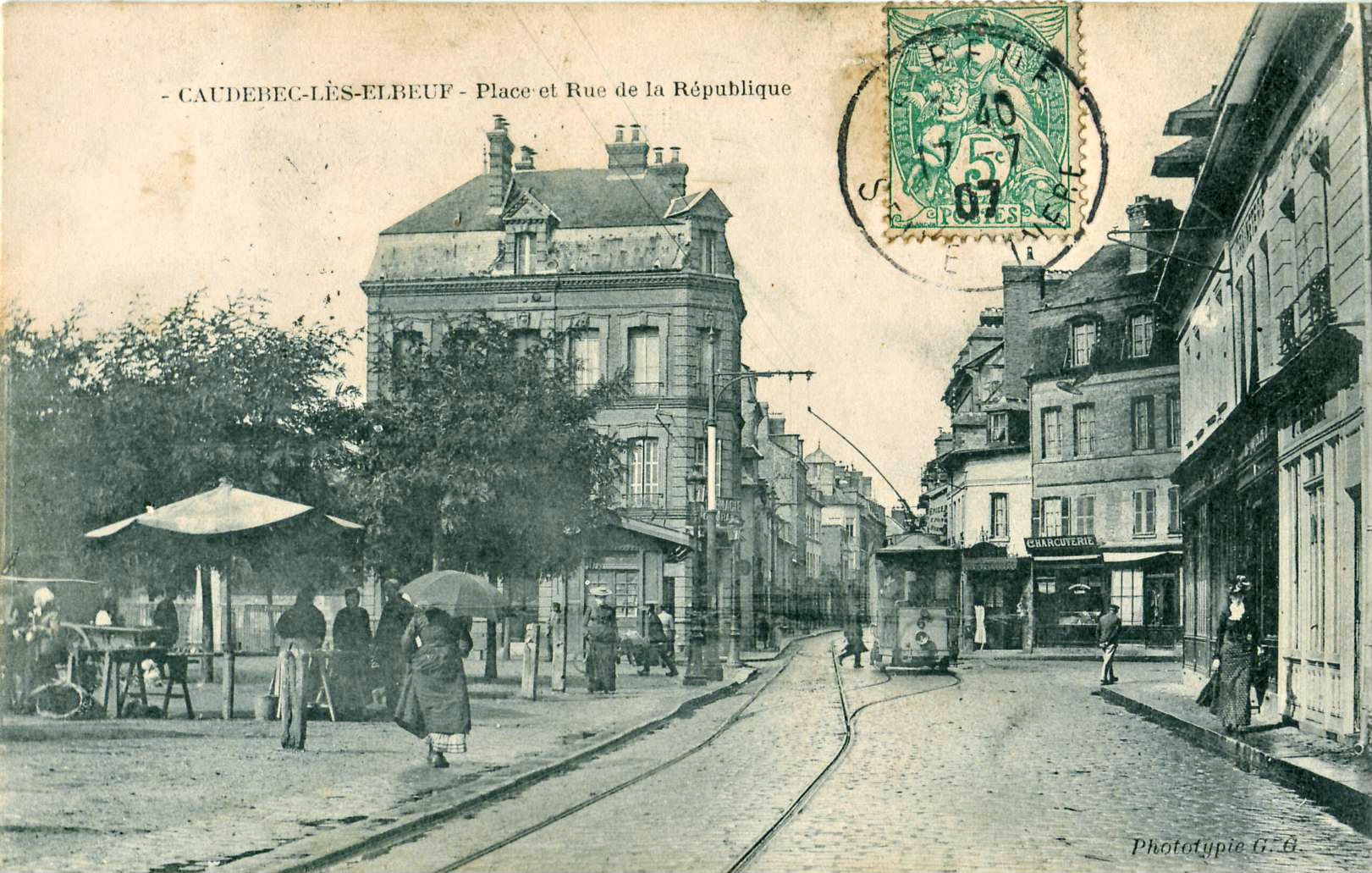

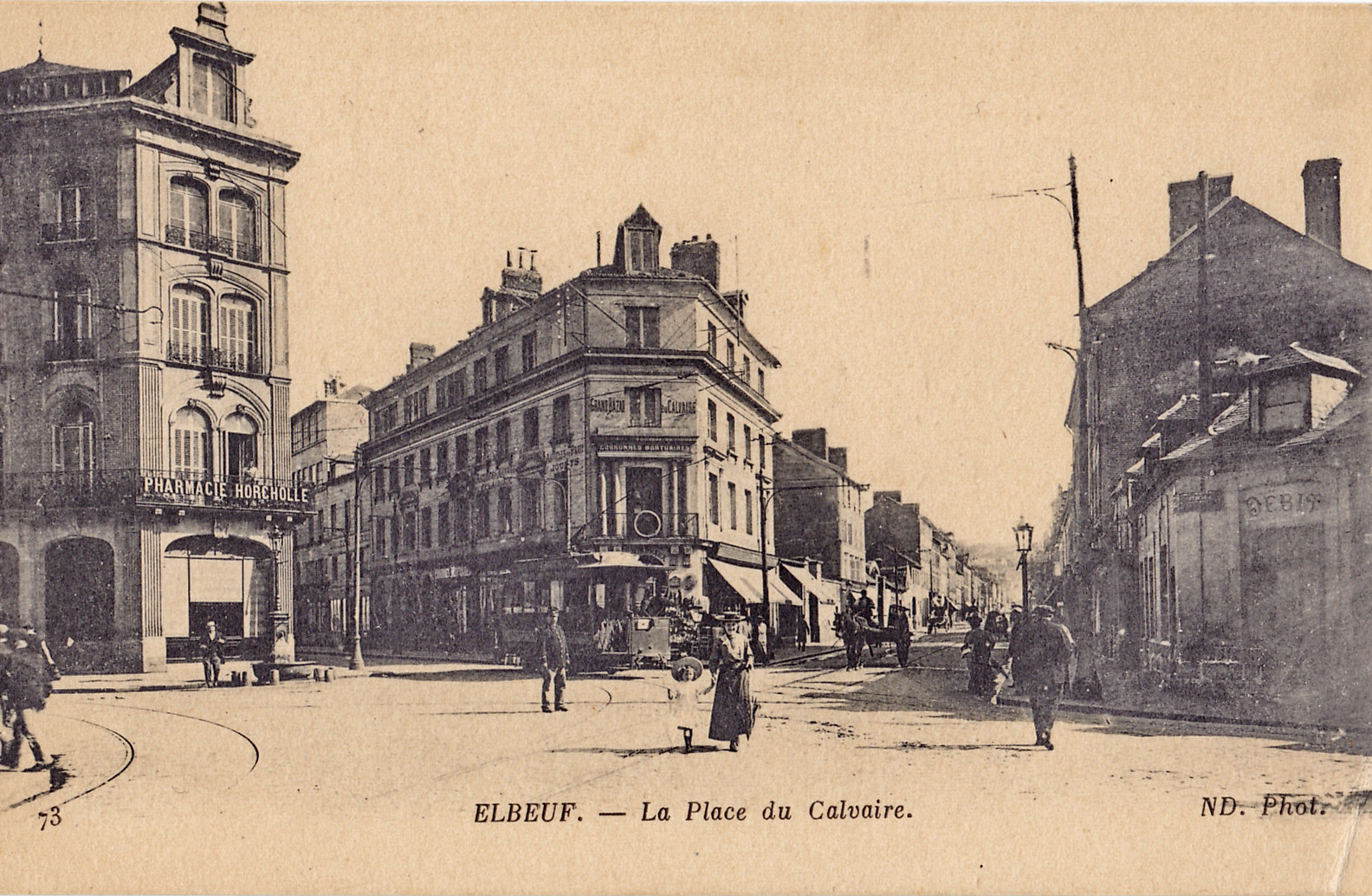

As early as 1898, the service was organized around two main axes, each formed by the combination of two lines: lines 1 and 2 formed the "main line," connecting Saint-Pierre-lès-Elbeuf and Orival in 32 minutes for a journey of nearly seven kilometers, while lines 3 and 4 constituted the "station line," shorter (2.3 km), starting from Elbeuf-Ville station and ending at Saint-Aubin-lès-Elbeuf station, with a travel time of 12 minutes. The shuttle frequency was respectively 20 and 12 minutes. Interestingly, the operator had not planned for connections between them when they crossed at Place du Calvaire. Nevertheless, the tramway was very popular; in 1899, the first year of full operation, the number of passengers transported reached 1,450,000. However, these good traffic statistics did not hide financial and operational difficulties for long.

From the beginning of operation, numerous defects were noted in the establishment of the line, such as the impossibility of two tramcars crossing at Place du Calvaire due to the insufficient width of the track (this problem was quickly resolved - see the illustration opposite - without knowing the exact date, probably before the second quarter of 1899). But it was mainly the operation of the network that proved calamitous. In the early years of service, derailments and accidents were commonplace. Due to the limited speed of the convoys in the city center (12 km/h maximum) and to meet schedules never respected, the motormen pushed their machines to the ends of the lines, disregarding all safety rules. Not without exaggeration, the local press reported numerous accidents caused by this disregard for safety, stating that the disabled and elderly were decimated by the tramway at a frightful rate. The only record held by the network was that of fatal accidents. In addition to these safety problems, there was a lack of punctuality of the tramcars, especially on the station line, which missed its connections with trains at Elbeuf-Ville and Saint-Aubin-lès-Elbeuf stations; however, the management attributed this to the malfunction of the clocks at the stations of the Western Railway Company. The management of the network proved equally problematic because, despite good traffic results, the network was in deficit from 1899 and never generated profits until its closure.

=== An early closure ===
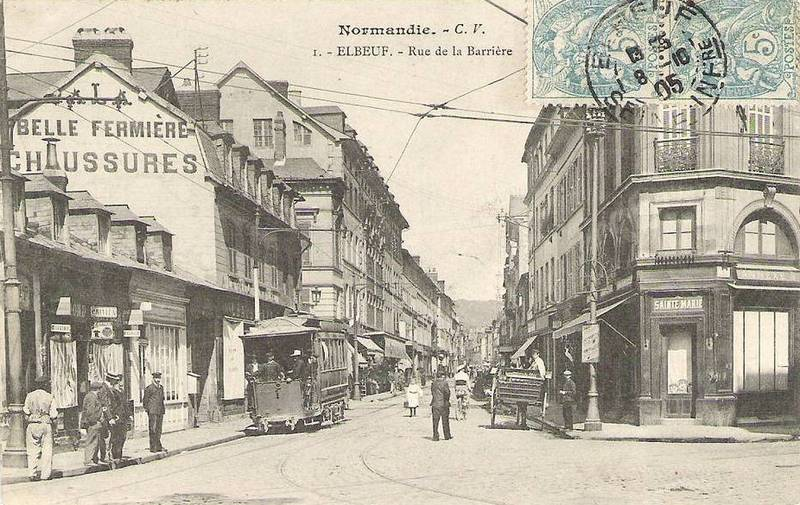

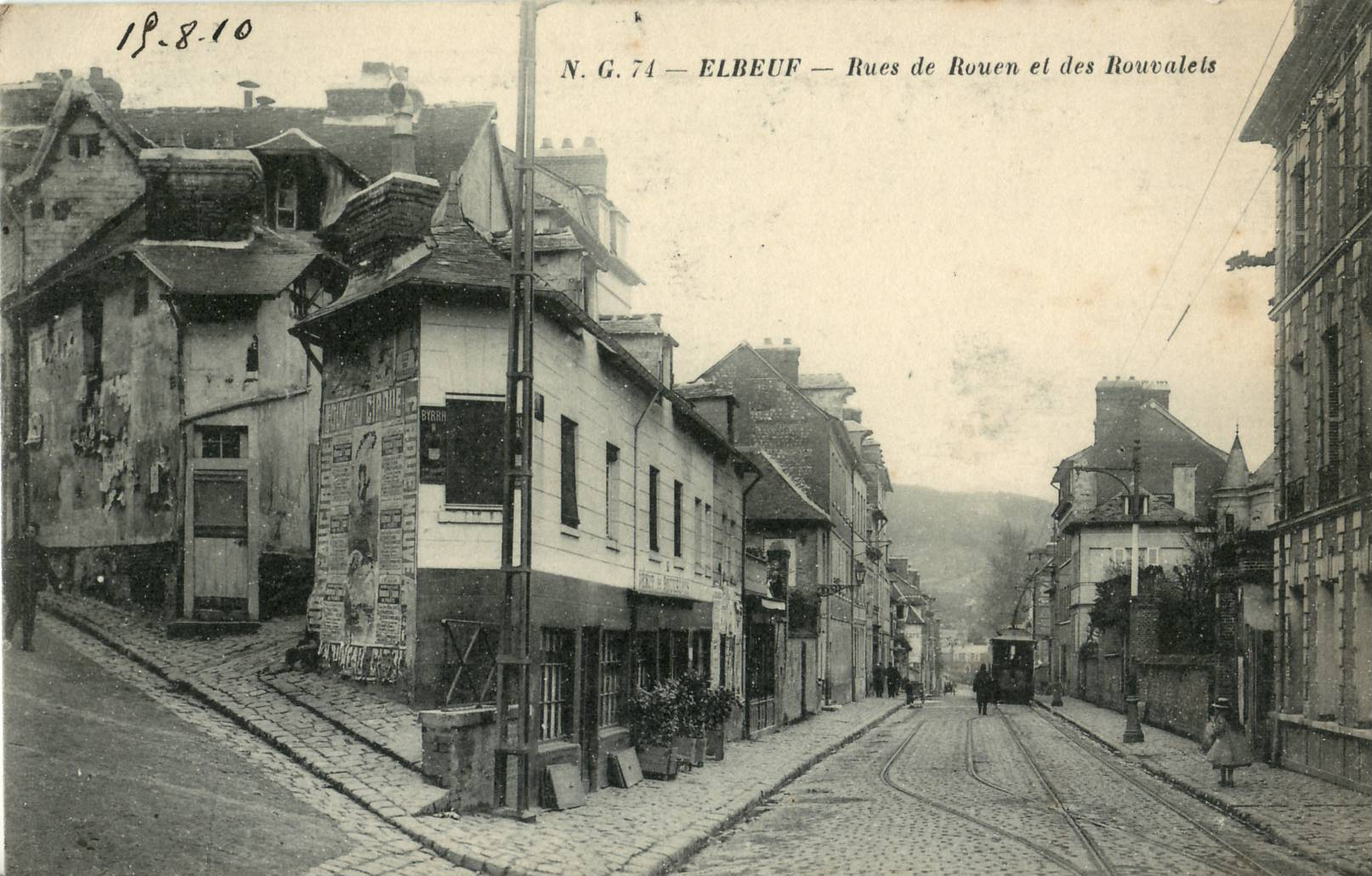

The change in the main shareholder — the central company of railways and tramways becoming the parent company of the Société des tramways électriques d'Elbeuf on October 1, 1906, replacing the general traction company — did not change anything in the situation. The poorly trained personnel were poorly paid and therefore unstable (in 1907, half of the wattmen had less than six months of seniority). Frequent reminders of discipline were necessary, so in 1908, it was stipulated in the regulations given to the tram drivers that they should not lose sight of the company's interests, they should not be lacking in politeness and tact towards passengers, they should arrive ten minutes before the tram departure time, it was forbidden to be drunk, smoke, and spit during service.

The lack of qualification of the Elbeuf employees forced the company to call upon personnel from the second network of tramways in Rouen without improving the quality of service. While in the rest of the department the traffic increased on the different tramway networks, that of Elbeuf continued to lose passengers since the beginning of the century, in 1912, the number of passengers transported had fallen to 1,170,000. Under these conditions, the projects to extend the tramway from Place du Calvaire to Place du Tivoli via Cours Carnot (line 5), from Rue de Paris to Saint-Jean Church (line 6), or, even more ambitious, from Saint-Aubin-lès-Elbeuf to Rouen via the right bank of the Seine and Amfreville-la-Mi-Voie remained without follow-up.

To restore its profitability, the company, which seems to have been linked to electricity production companies, decided to sell part of its electricity production as early as 1902, which balanced the budget for 1904, but, the following year, the Gas Company aligned its rates, and STEE was again, and definitively, in deficit. This led to difficulties for the tramway, which was not a priority compared to other subscribers, and whose operation was interrupted between March 9 and April 6, 1911, following an excess of electrical production.

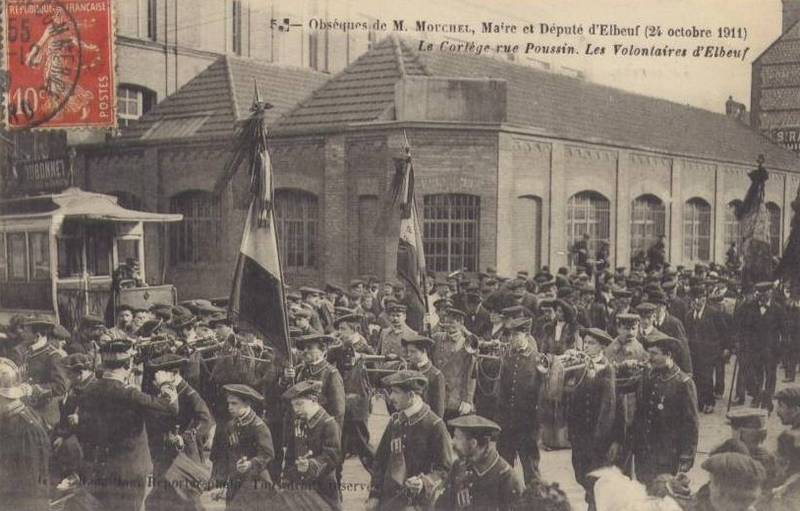

World War I saw traffic interrupted during the first weeks of the conflict, but traffic resumed on September 10, 1914, albeit in a reduced manner. Line No. 4 was closed, only one motorcar ran on the other three lines at first, then two from the end of the year. The network was able to operate, every morning and evening between Place du Calvaire and Saint-Pierre-les-Elbeuf, a workers' train composed of four trailers flanked by two motorcars. But the operation experienced further degradation as the company recruited, due to a lack of available workforce, young personnel (some wattmen were less than sixteen years old), who had received no training and were left to their own devices. The young tram drivers rode at their own whims, burned the stop posts, refused to give change, insulted passengers on the motorcars. Sometimes, even when they reached the end of the line, the employees did not take the time to maneuver the trailers and thus pushed back the carriages, sitting in the passenger compartment of the motorcars, vaguely supervising the tramway operation between stops.

These erratic behaviors ceased with the return of demobilized employees at the beginning of 1919, but the equipment, poorly maintained, was on its last legs. From February 9, 1919, the operation was placed under municipal control, repairs were made, and fares were raised. The disenchantment of passengers, competition from road services (factories preferred to transport their employees by trucks, then by buses) led to increased deficits while shareholders only thought of getting rid of this financial burden.

The frequency of service on the lines further reduced in the early 1920s, the poorly paid personnel triggered a strike on January 8, 1926, which signaled the end of the network. The motorcars were never to circulate again, despite the proposal of two Elbeuf industrialists who planned to renovate the network and purchase used equipment from the tramways of Rouen. Finally, in 1927, the tramway was replaced by a bus service which quickly declined and ceased in 1936.

== Infrastructure ==
=== Routes ===
Article 2 of the specifications attached to the decree of October 19, 1898, amending the 1882 declaration of public utility for the tramway, states:

"The network will include the following lines and will use the public roads designated below:

Line No. 1 - From Place du Calvaire to Orival, passing through the streets of Barrière, République, Saint-Étienne, and Rouen (major communication route No. 132). In the municipality of Orival: Route de Rouen (major communication route No. 132).

Line No. 2 - From Place du Calvaire to Saint-Pierre-lez-Elbeuf, via Rue de Caudebec (major communication route No. 144). In the municipality of Caudebec-lez-Elbeuf: Rue de la République (major communication route No. 144). In the municipality of Saint-Pierre-lez-Elbeuf: Rue de Louviers (major communication route No. 144).

Line No. 3 - From Place du Calvaire to Saint-Aubin (station on the Rouen to Serquigny line), via Rue de Paris (major communication route No. 144). In the municipality of Saint-Aubin-Jouxte-Boulleng: Via Rue de la République (major communication route No. 144) and the access road to the station. Line No. 3 terminates in the station yard.

Line No. 4 - From Place du Calvaire to the station on the Rouen to Chartres line, via Rue du Neubourg (major communication route No. 132), Rue de l'Union (urban road), and via Rue Saint-Jacques and Avenue Gambetta (extension of major communication route No. 132). Line No. 4 terminates in the station yard.

Line No. 5 - From Elbeuf-Saint-Aubin station to Place du Champ-de-Foire, using Line No. 3 until Rue Thiers, then passing through Rue Thiers and Rue Solférino (urban road). Line No. 5 terminates at Champ de Foire and the quays."

=== Track ===
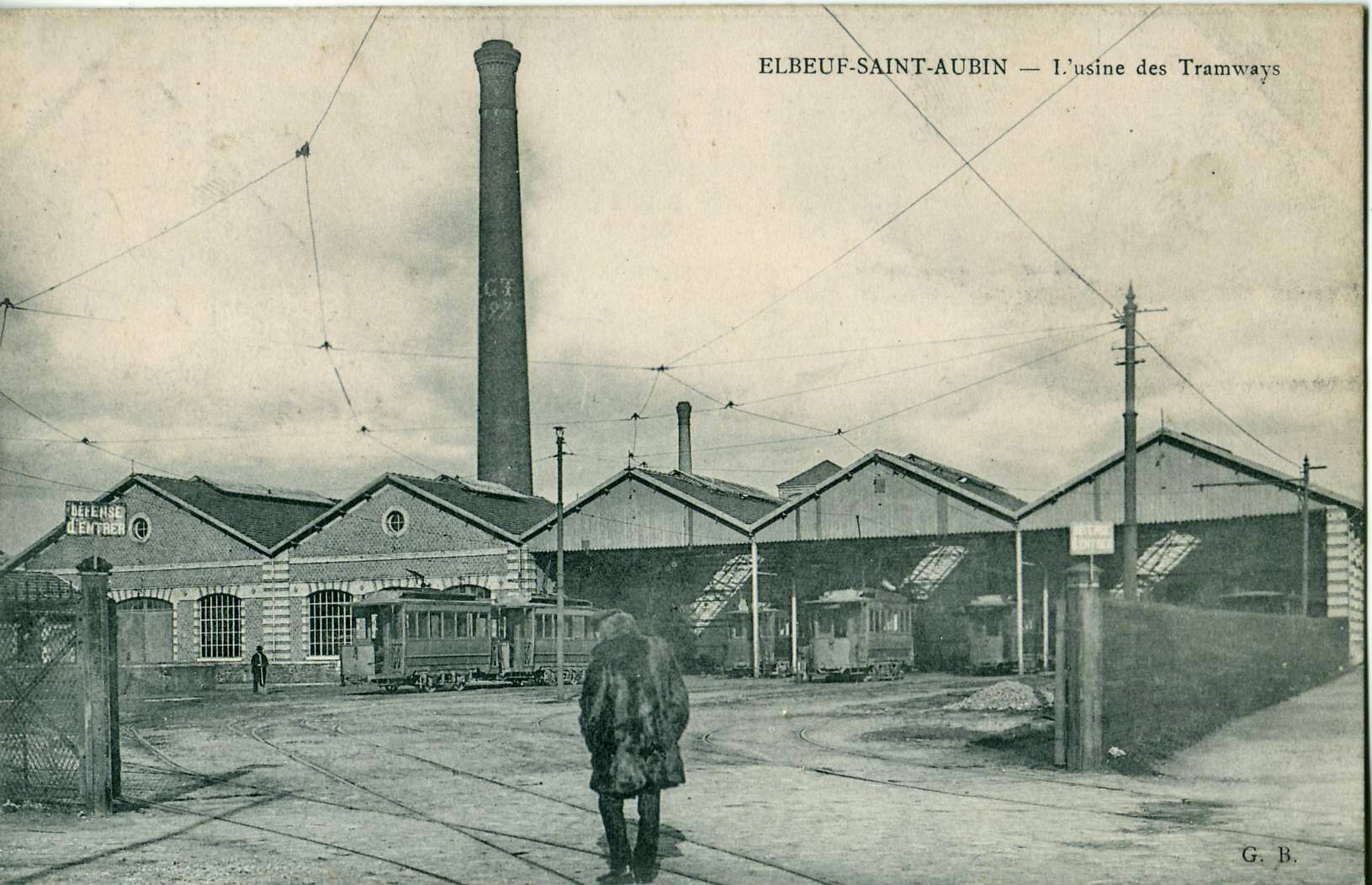

The entirety of the lines was established as single-track, mostly along the sides of streets, except in the center of the city of Elbeuf where the width of the thoroughfares allowed for the establishment of a central track with the presence of long garages. To ensure the crossing of the motorcars, fourteen sidings were set up (nine on the main line, five on the line to the stations).

The rails used were originally Broca type weighing 44 kg/m (a good portion of the tracks were renewed in 1913 with rails of the same type but weighing 36 kg/m). The network had an easy profile, the tracks were generally laid on a level surface except at the exit of Elbeuf on line No. 1 near Orival or not far from Elbeuf-Ville station on route No. 4 where the slopes reached over 50 on short sections.

The track was renewed in 1912/1913 for 80 % of its length.

The different stops were marked by white poles, passengers purchased their tickets from the onboard personnel of the tramway.

=== Depot ===
A single building was sufficient for the operation of the network and housed the Company's offices, the depot and workshop for equipment repairs, as well as the power plant supplying the line. This vast complex (expanded in 1910) was located within the territory of the municipality of Saint-Aubin-lès-Elbeuf, not far from the Seine, within an area bounded by the streets Nivert, Saint-Louis, and Caroline.

=== Power production ===
STEE had its own power plant installed within the depot area in Saint-Aubin. Despite capacity extensions, and considering the electrical power sold to individuals or businesses, this plant proved inadequate and a new one was commissioned in June 1913 in Grand-Quevilly, equipped with 4 turbines of 7,500 hp, intended to supply a new tramway network between Rouen and Elbeuf. It was connected to the Elbeuf tramway by a feeder between Grand-Quevilly and Grand-Couronne through the Rouvray forest, then reached Orival up to a substation located on Rue Chanzy. Another feeder supplied the Rouen tramway network. Pending the commissioning of this plant, SREE operated the plant of its former rival, the Elbeuf Gas Company. In 1913, another feeder connected the substation on Rue Chanzy and Place du Coq.

STEE supplied the tramway network at that time, the municipal networks of Saint-Aubin and Elbeuf, and the Elbeuf Gas Company, which distributed electricity to Caudebec and Saint-Pierre, through its substation on Rue du Neubourg in Elbeuf.

== Operation ==
=== Frequencies ===
From 1898, the network was operated on two lines: the main line between Saint-Pierre, Caudebec, Elbeuf, and Orival, covering 6.935 kilometers in 32 minutes. The combined routes 3 and 4 formed the station line, which had a length of 2.345 kilometers and was covered in 12 minutes. These two lines intersected at Place du Calvaire, without providing connections between them. At the opening, the frequencies were one tram every 12 minutes on the station line and every 20 minutes on the main line.

The station line was contractually obligated to provide connections with trains from 5:05 a.m. to 8:25 p.m., but this obligation, rarely fulfilled, led to numerous complaints.

In 1900, to avoid underutilization of the trams at the end of the line, a shuttle service was created on the main line, indicated by a white plate with a red dot, between Les Rouvalets and Caudebec-Assemblée at a frequency of 8 minutes, with the rest of the line served every 16 minutes. This shuttle disappeared in the winter service of 1901-1902, with the frequency of the main line increased to 12 minutes and that of the station line to 8 minutes.

=== Fares ===
At the opening of the line, fares were 15 centimes for 1st class and 10 centimes for 2nd class. Due to the merger of lines, the journey from Saint-Pierre to Orival cost 30 and 20 centimes. Round-trip tickets also existed, at 20 and 15 centimes per section. In 1899, a weekly card was created for worker subscriptions, allowing travel between 5 a.m. and 7 a.m., as well as return between 6 p.m. and 7 p.m. for 70 centimes. A card for 1.25 FRF allowed an additional journey between 11 a.m. and 1 p.m.

To try to regain the initial traffic of the network, the company created a transfer fare between the two lines at 15 and 10 centimes between Les Rouvalets, L'assemblée, Saint-Aubin, and Elbeuf-ville in 1901.

To try to offset the economic disruptions of the war and post-war period, fares were increased on September 18, 1916, and the subscription card rose to 1 FRF, then to 1.05 FRF on December 8, 1917, 1.10 FRF on December 3, 1918, 1.30 FRF on March 29, 1919, and 1.50 FRF on November 16, 1920. The transfer fare was abolished on September 18, 1916, with passengers then having to pay a second ticket when changing lines.

=== Statistical data ===
In 1899, the network transported 1,443,899 passengers, a significant figure for a population of 40,000, generating a daily revenue of 50 francs.

In 1900, the daily revenue was reduced to 48 francs, with expenses of 210,875 FRF and revenues of 188,333 FRF, resulting in a deficit of 22,542 FRF. The total distance covered by all motorcars was 601,108 km, and 24,970 km for the trailers.

By 1904, the budget was balanced thanks to the sale of electrical energy. However, in 1906, STEE reported a deficit of 40,176 FRF with revenues of 180,953 FRF.

In 1912, a year of significant works, revenue was 208,275 FRF with expenses of 211,627 FRF and 1,172,560 passengers.

In 1921, the tramway cars only covered 397,708 km, generating revenue (adjusted for inflation) of 470,213 FRF and a deficit of 23,481 FRF.

=== Personnel ===
Few details have been obtained about the number of employees employed by the companies that operated the tramway over nearly thirty years. In 1900, the staff consisted of fifty employees distributed as follows:

- Two members among the administrative staff.
- Thirty-two members among the traction staff: depot manager, depot employees, wattmen.
- Fourteen among the operating staff: office employees, ticket collectors.
- Two members of the track staff: track maintenance workers.

As in other small networks, the advertised tasks did not always correspond to the actual functions of the staff, as they could occupy several positions as needed. Moreover, the occasional employment of personnel from the second network of tramways in Rouen (also managed by Mr. Cauderay) at the beginning of the operation, and seasonal employees (about ten during the summer), make it difficult to evaluate the number of tramway employees.

== See also ==
- Tram
- List of town tramway systems in France
- Chemins de fer de l'Ouest
- Trams in Rouen
- Le Havre's old tramway
- Métropole Rouen Normandie

== Bibliography ==
- Bertin, Hervé (1994). Petits trains et tramways haut-normands (in French). Cénomane. ISBN 2-905596-48-1.
- Bayeux, Jean-Luc (1969). Les transports en commun de la ville d'Elbeuf (1872-1936) (in French). Chemins de fer régionaux et urbains. ISSN 1141-7447.
- Lamy, Alain (1987). Le Tramway d'Elbeuf : de 1872 à 1936 (in French). Éditions Temps libre. ISBN 2-9501670-1-2.
- Banaudo, José (2009). Sur les rails de Normandie (in French). Éditions du Cabri. ISBN 978-2-914603-43-0.
- Courant, René (1982). Le Temps des tramways (in French). Éditions du Cabri. ISBN 2-903310-22-X.
- Marquis, Jean-Claude (1983). Petite histoire illustrée des transports en Seine-Inférieure au xixe siècle (in French). Éditions du CRDP.
- Encyclopédie générale des transports : Chemins de fer (in French). Vol. 12. Éditions de l'Ormet. 1994. ISBN 2-906575-13-5.
