= Grenoble tramway =

Tram system in Grenoble, France

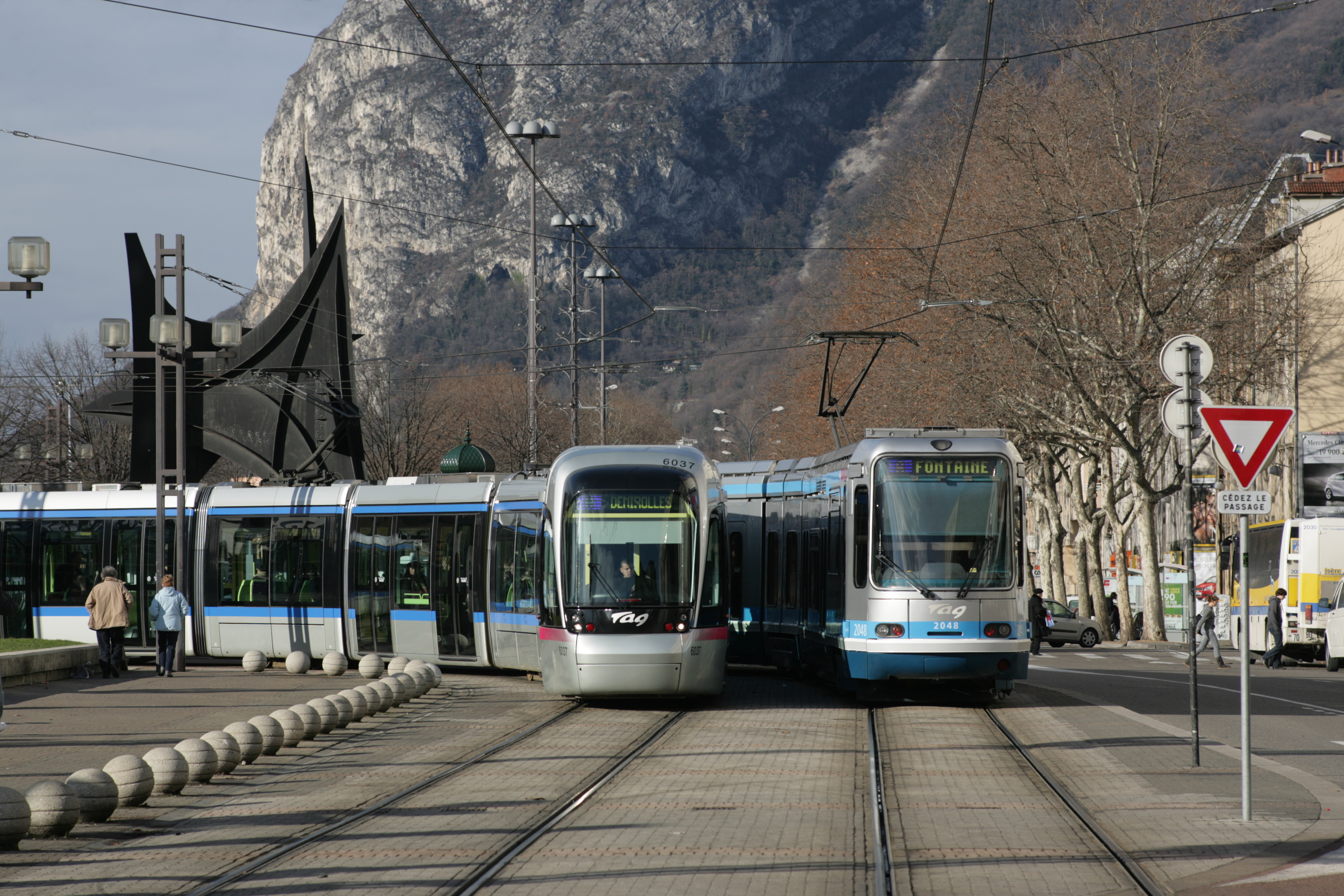

Overview
- Native name: Tramway de Grenoble
- Locale: Grenoble, Rhône-Alpes, France
- Transit type: Tram
- Number of lines: 5
- Number of stations: 82
- Daily ridership: 233,700 (2015)

Operation
- Began operation: 1987
- Operator: Société d'Économie Mixte des Transports Publics de l'Agglomération Grenobloise (SEMITAG)

Technical
- System length: 43.7 km (27.2 mi)
- Track gauge: 1,435 mm (4 ft 8 1/2 in) standard gauge
- Electrification: 750V DC overhead
System map

The Grenoble tramway (French: Tramway de Grenoble) is the tram system in the city of Grenoble in the Rhône-Alpes region of France. In 1987, Grenoble became the second French city to reintroduce trams, the first being the Nantes tramway. The current network is 35-kilometre (22 mi) long, and comprises five lines: lines A, B, C, D and E. Line A was opened in 1987, line B in 1990, line C on 20 May 2006, line D in October 2007 and line E on 28 June 2014.

The tramway is operated by the Société d'économie mixte des transports publics de l'agglomération grenobloise (SÉMITAG) on behalf of the Communauté d'agglomération Grenoble Alpes Métropole, the intercommunal structure linking the commune of Grenoble and its suburbs. SÉMITAG operates its services, which includes local bus services as well as the tramway, under the Tag brand.

== History ==
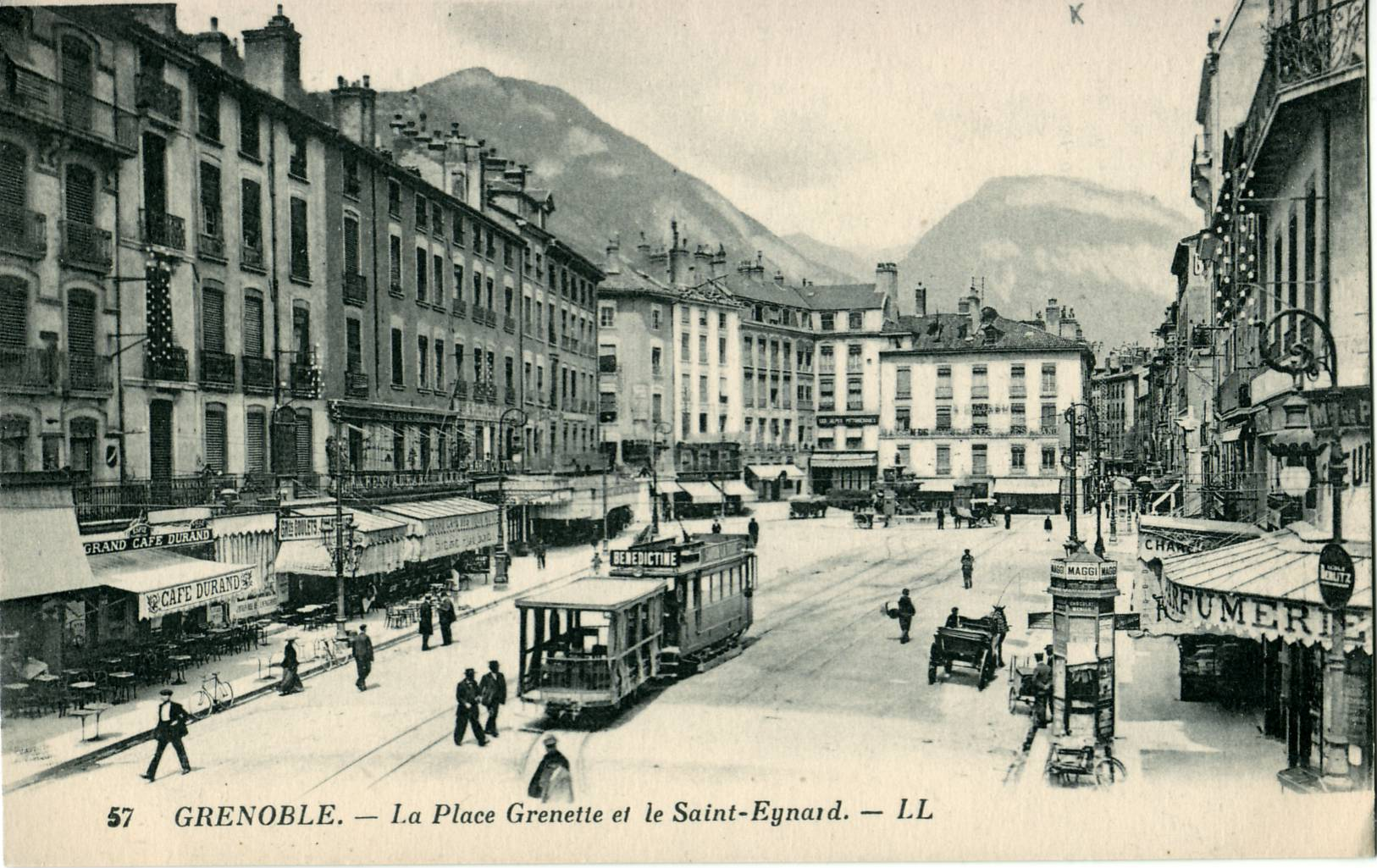
A tramway and its leg arriving to the end of the line at the place Grenette.

The Historic Tramway of Grenoble was a 1,000 mm (3 ft 3 3/8 in) metre gauge urban and suburban electric tramway network from the Grenoble region of France. It was created in 1894 and operated by the société grenobloise de tramways électriques, which has today entirely disappeared. At this time of industrial and demographic growth, the old Hippomobile modes of transportation, fiacres and omnibuses, established since the end of the 18th century, were no longer sufficient to ensure smooth transport in cities. The urban and suburban lines developed continuously until the 1920s. At this point there were three main operators: the Société grenobloise de tramways électriques, which operated the urban lines; the Voies ferrées du Dauphiné, which served from Grenoble, the Left Bank of the Isère up to Froges as well as the valley of l'Oisans; and the tramway Grenoble - Chapareillan, which linked the center of Grenoble to Chapareillan and serves the whole Right Bank in the valley of Grésivaudan. With the rise of the bus, the trolleybus and the private car, ridership and profits declined and the tramways were replaced by buses. The last line was closed in 1952 after 52 years of service, and the current tramway was only launched 35 years later in 1987.

== Network ==
The current network comprises 93 stations, 12 of which are shared by multiple lines:

- Line A has 31 stations.
- Line B has 22 stations.
- Line C has 19 stations.
- Line D has 15 stations.
- Line E has 17 stations.

== Rolling stock ==
The Grenoble tramway is served by a total of 103 trams. The older 53 are Alsthom TFS trams, whilst the newer 50, which began entering service with the opening of the B line extension and the C line, are Alstom Citadis trams.

=== Alsthom TFS ===
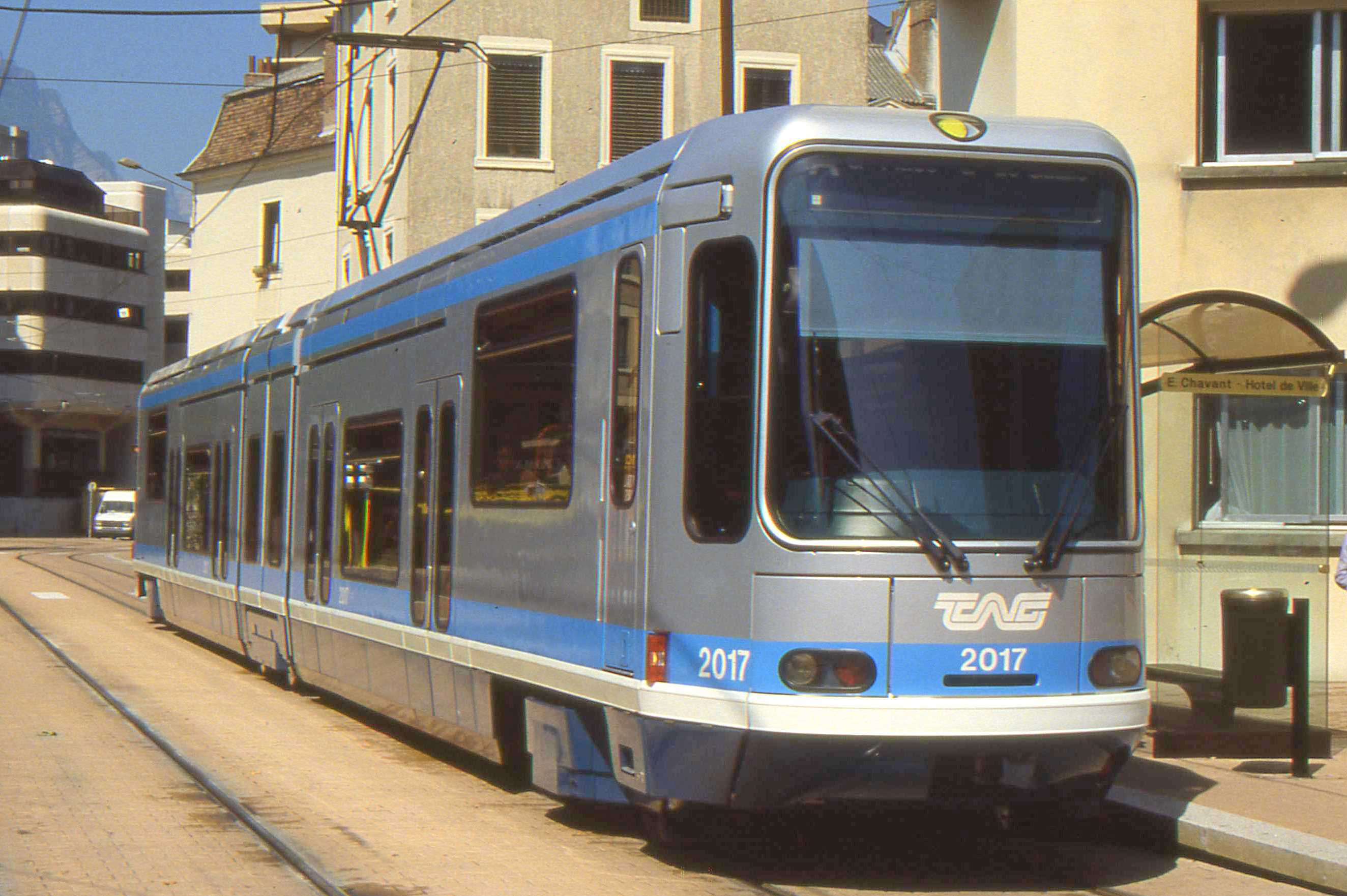
Alsthom TFS tram in Grenoble

The Alsthom TFS fleet consists of 53 trams numbered from 2001 to 2053 running on all four lines of the network. They were introduced in successive steps as follows:

- Series Grenoble 1 (trams 2001 to 2020) introduced in 1986/1987
- Series Grenoble 2 (trams 2021 to 2035) introduced in 1989/1990
- Series Grenoble 3 (trams 2036 to 2038) introduced in 1992
- Series Grenoble 4 (trams 2039 to 2053) introduced in 1995/1996

=== Alstom Citadis ===
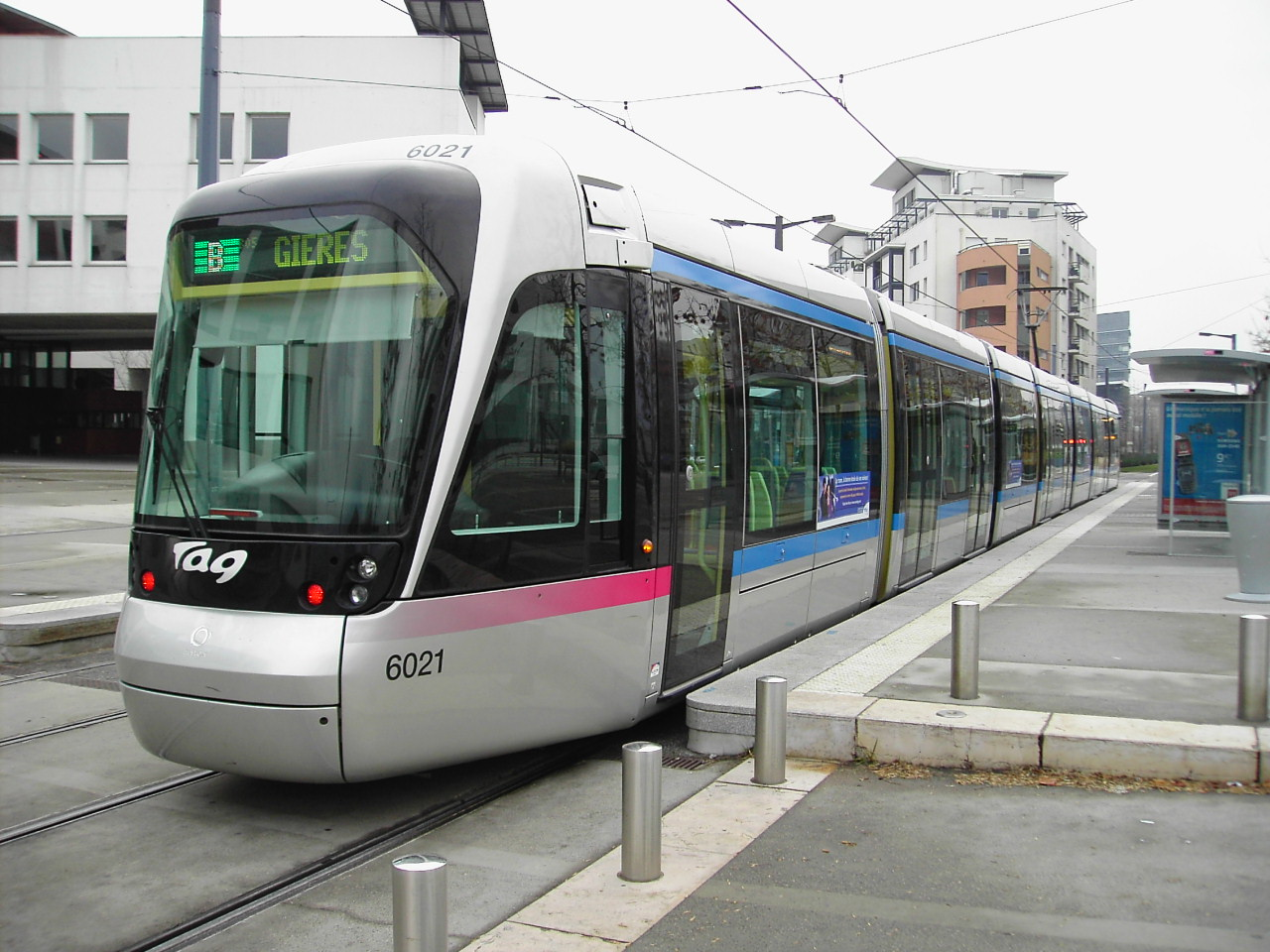
Alstom Citadis 402

The Alstom Citadis fleet is composed of 50 trams numbered from 6001 to 6050, and circulates on the A, B and C lines. There are several series:

- Grenoble 1 (trams numbers 6001 to 6035) entered service in 2005
- Grenoble 2 (trams 6036 to 6050) entered service 4 May 2009, introducing Citadis trams on Line A
- Trams 6018-6020 were used for the inauguration of the C Line, on 20 May 2006. They carried a multicolor floral decoration for a few months, echoing the slogan "A flower for the city" used during the line's construction.

== Future extensions ==
- Line A extended by two stops from its current terminus at Denis Papin, Échirolles to the neighbouring commune of Pont-de-Claix, with completion expected at the end of 2019. Proposals have also been floated since 2001 to extend Line A at the opposite end towards Sassenage, but no concrete studies have been put in place as of 2017.
- Extensions to line D, probably from Saint-Martin-d'Hères to Grand'Place or/and from the university campus towards Meylan are also planned, but have not been decided.
- A preliminary study was made in 2012 to extend line E to Pont-de-Claix.

A tram-train linking Moirans to the centre of Grenoble as well as one linking Crolles and Grenoble have been studied, but the former project has been set aside due to current saturation of that train line by longer distance traffic. A link from Grenoble to Vizille via Pont-de-Claix, Jarrie and Champ-sur-Drac is also under consideration.

== See also ==
- Trams in France
- List of town tramway systems in France
- Ancient tramway of Grenoble
