= Transport Est-Ouest Rouennais =

Bus rapid transit system in Rouen, France

TEOR

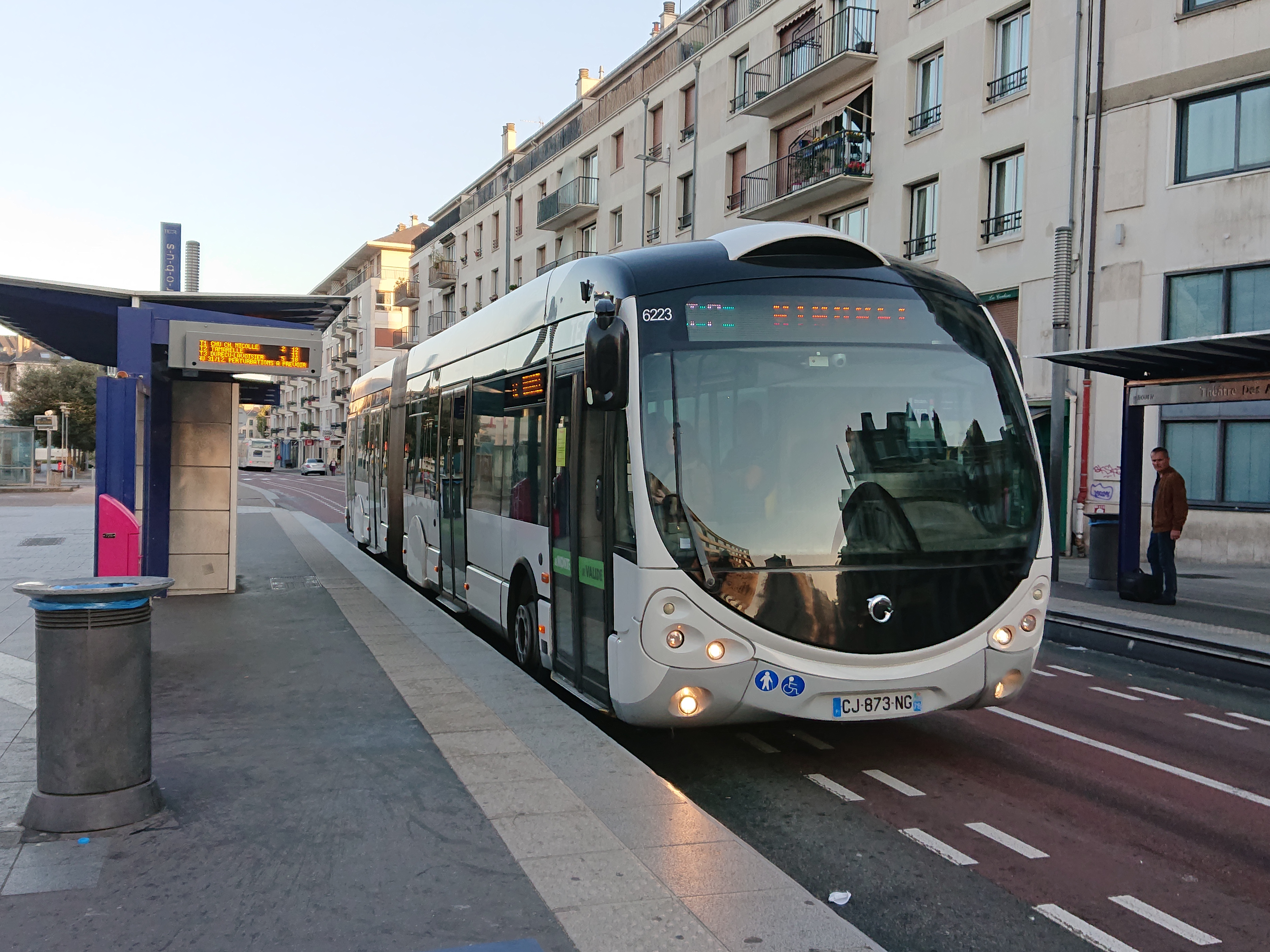

Overview
- Locale: Rouen, Normandy
- Transit type: Bus rapid transit, Guided bus
- Number of lines: 4
- Number of stations: 64
- Daily ridership: 45,000 (2008)

Operation
- Began operation: 12 February 2001
- Operator: TCAR

Technical
- System length: 38 km (23.6 mi)

The TEOR (Transport Est-Ouest Rouennais) is a bus rapid transit system operating in the city of Rouen, Normandy, France. The service was inaugurated in February 2001. TEOR was the second BRT system implemented in France (after Évry).

All three TEOR lines operate on separate bus lanes. It allows for a much faster and efficient public transportation network. TEOR vehicles are able to travel rapidly without encountering traffic problems.

The system is operated by TCAR (Transports en Commun de l'Agglomération Rouennaise), a subsidiary of Transdev.

== Services ==
=== Line T1 ===
Mont-Saint-Aignan to Rouen

=== Line T2 ===
Notre-Dame-de-Bondeville to Bihorel

=== Line T3 ===
Canteleu to Darnétal

=== Line T4 ===
Grand-Quevilly to Rouen

== Vehicles ==
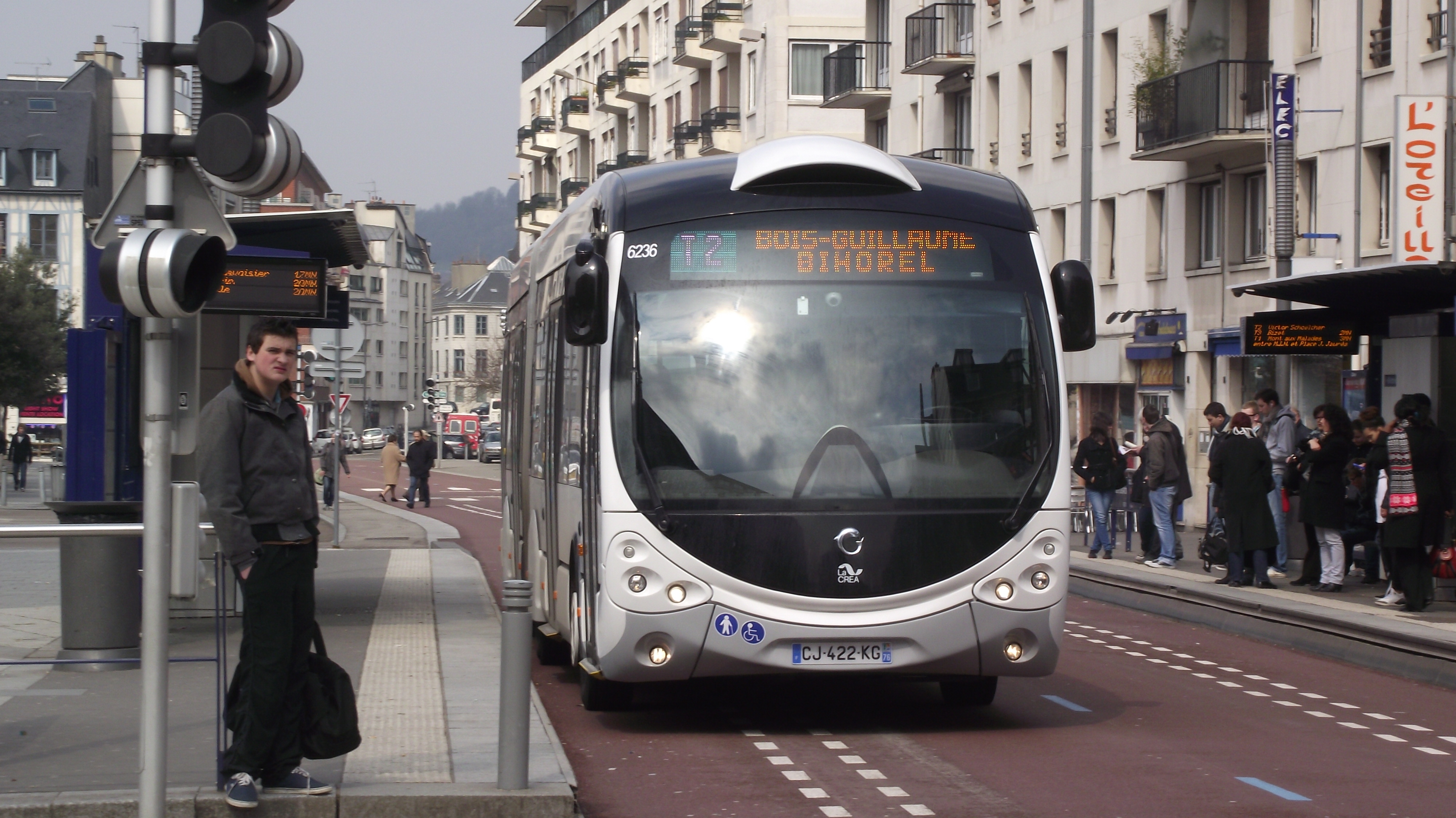
Irisbus Crealis on line T2

Each vehicle also has a GPS locator on board, which allows traffic signals to give the TEOR buses priority at busy intersections, keeping them moving as much as possible. Four doors on each side of the vehicle allow fast and easy boarding and exiting.

=== Optical guidance ===
The system is notable for its use of optical guidance of the vehicles at the stations. Markings on the roadway and camera systems on the vehicles were used for docking. A similar optical system is used by the Autonomous Rail Rapid Transit system.

=== Irisbus Citelis 18 ===
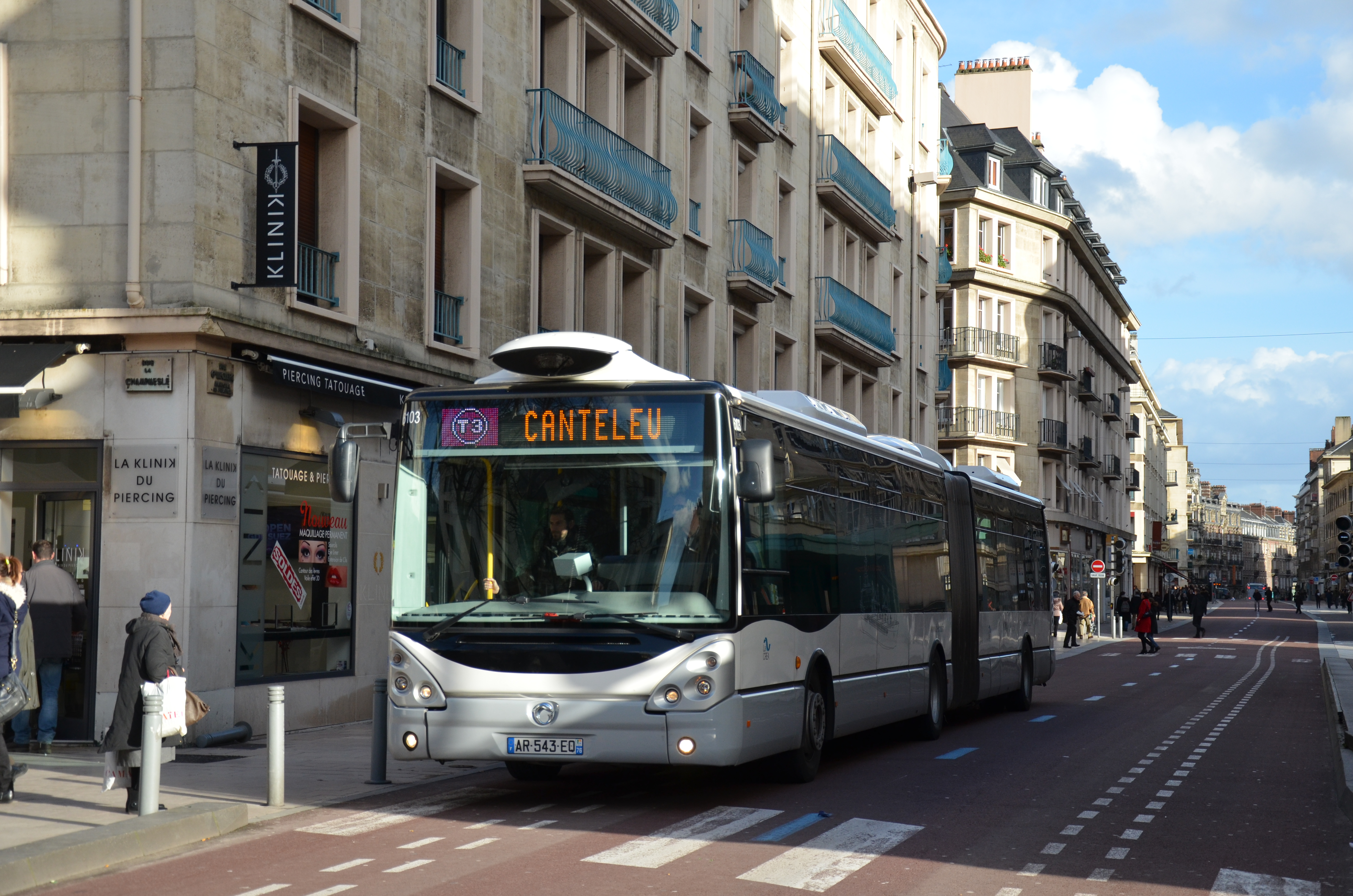
Irisbus Citelis 18 on line T3

The TEOR runs a fleet of 28 articulated Irisbus Citelis 18 manufactured by Irisbus, each with a seating capacity of 43 and able to accommodate 67 more standing. The vehicles run on a diesel motor system that produce less emissions than regular buses (Euro 3).

== Stations ==
TEOR stations are easily accessible for all users, including those with reduced mobility.
