= Tramway Français Standard =

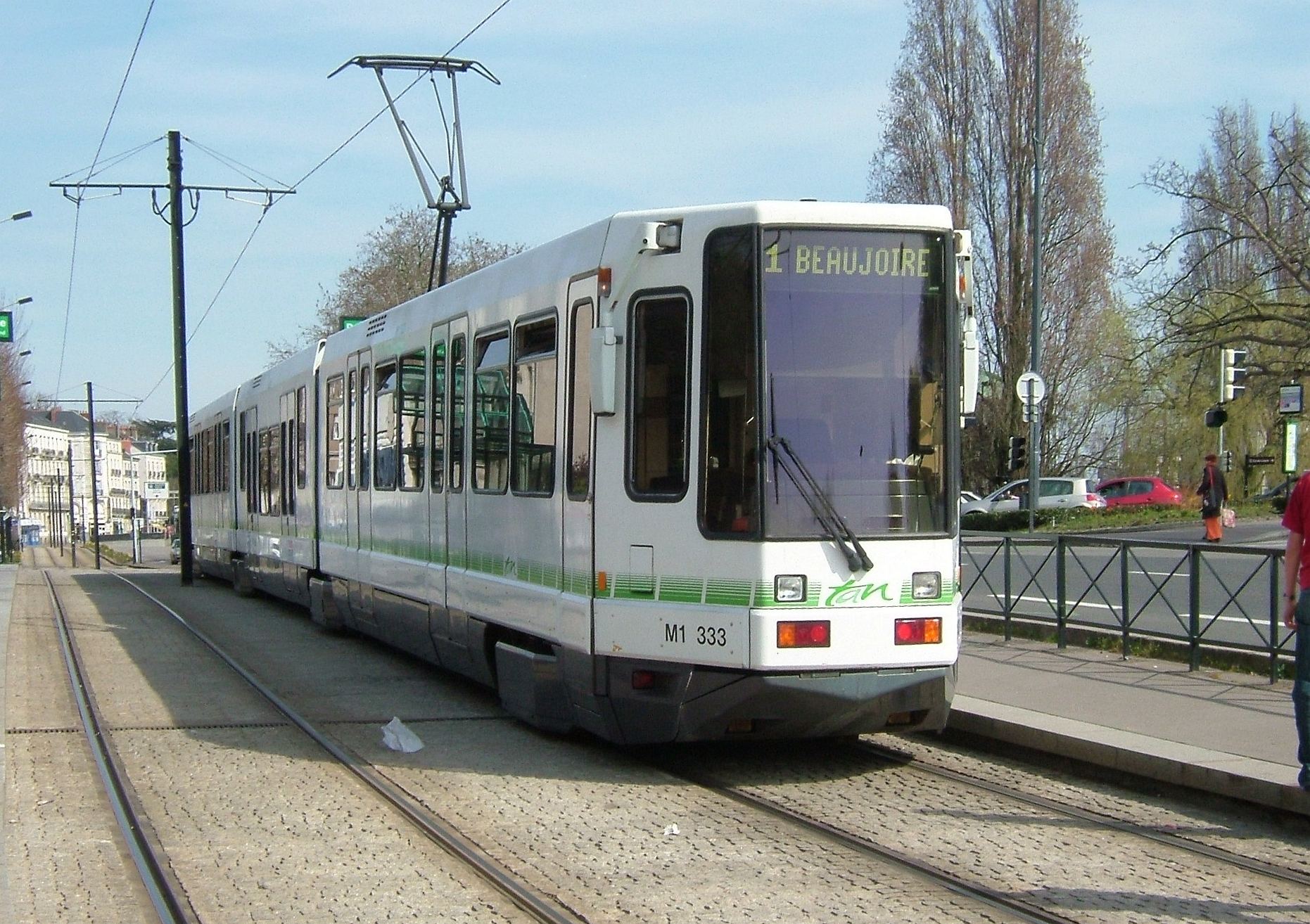
A TFS-1 tramcar at Nantes; note the high floor level and doors in the outer sections, and the low-floor centre section added at a later date.

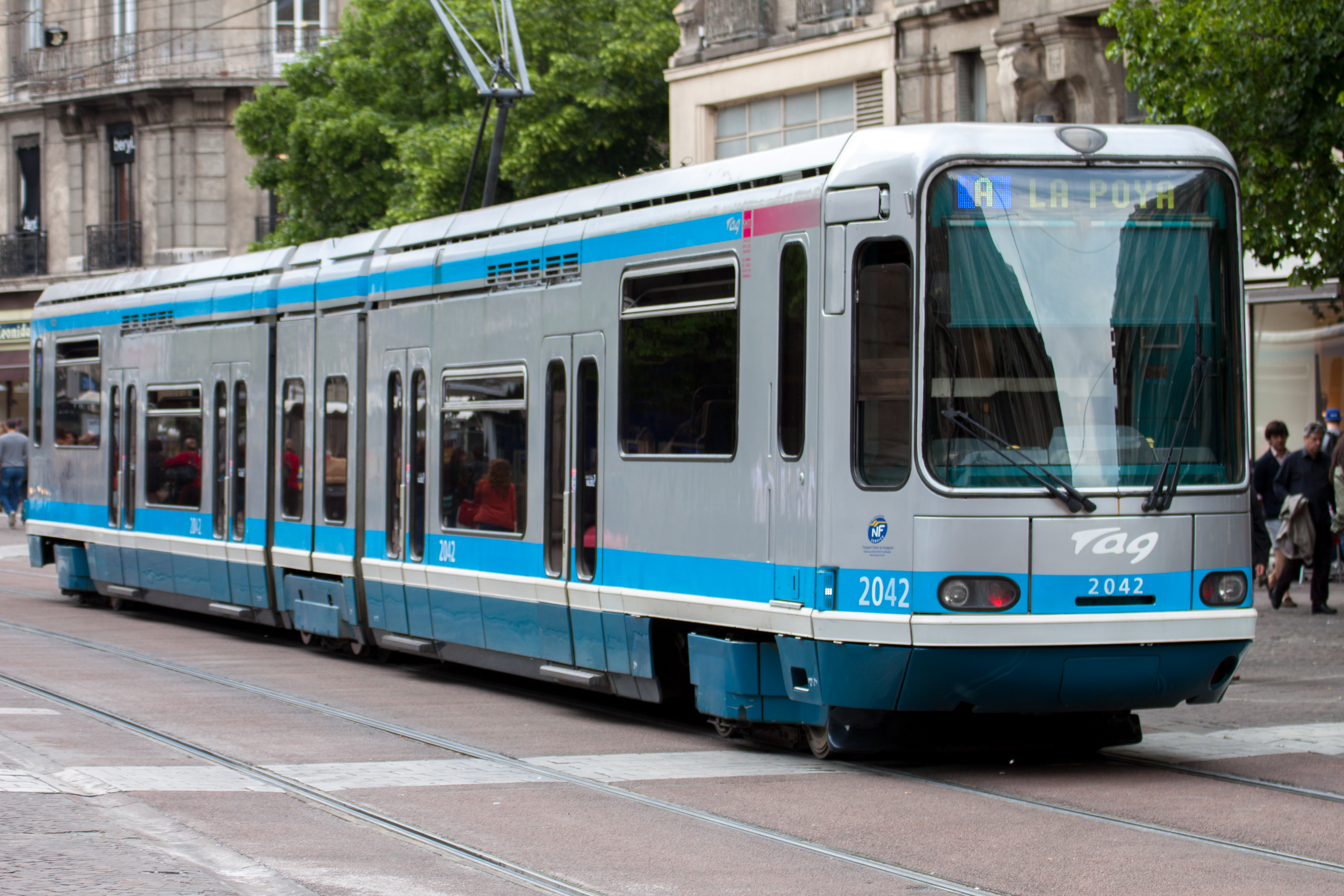
A TFS-2 tramcar at Grenoble; note the low-level central floor, with lower windows and doors.

The Tramway Français Standard (TFS) is a type of tram designed and manufactured by Alstom for use on various tramway systems in France. The TFS is no longer in production, having been superseded by the Alstom Citadis range of tramcars.

Two different models of the TFS were produced, both being articulated designs. The first model, the TFS-1, was built for the opening of the Nantes tram system in 1985. As built, these were single-articulated 6-axle tramcars with a high floor and steep stepped access from low level boarding platforms. All the tramcars built in this form have since been rebuilt with an added low-floor centre section, thus becoming 8-axle double-articulated cars. Nantes subsequently bought additional TFS-1 trams in this 8-axle configuration.

For the opening of the Grenoble tram system, the TFS-2 variant was created. This was also a 6-axle tramcar, but had a different articulation mechanism with a very short central section carried on a four-wheel truck. This allowed a low floor to be carried through most of the length of the car and between the wheels of the central truck, although the sections over the outer bogies are still at a high level and accessed by three steps from the low-floor section. All the doors are within the low-floor section. The advantages of this layout ensured that all subsequent users of the TFS tramcar have adopted the TFS-2 variant.

== TFS-2 ==
=== Technical data ===
The tramcars are articulated vehicles and are 29.40 m (96 ft 5 in) long and 44.2 tonnes in weight. The cars cannot work as multiple units, although in case of an emergency two cars may be coupled using an emergency coupling system. With one tramcar not functioning, and braking diminished, speed is limited to 10 km/h (6.2 mph).

The tramcars have the following characteristics:

Length	29.40 m (96 ft 5 in)
width	2.30 m (7 ft 7 in)
height	3.36 m (11 ft 0 in)
Gross weight	44.2 tonnes
Power	550 kW
Speed	70 km/h (43 mph)
Passenger capacity	52/125

=== Car ===
The tramcar is built on a chassis 2.3 m (7 ft 7 in) widejoined by a central chassis on which is assembled a single pantograph. The car has 3 bogies, one on each ends and one below the central portion.

Only the central parts of the cars have a lowered floor, at 34.5 cm (13.6 in) high to enable access to disabled users by four doors. The parts at both ends of the tramcars are built at 87.5 cm (34.4 in) high accessible by a small three-step staircase.

=== Motors ===
The two outer bogies are each equipped with a 275 kW electric motor. This gives the TFS a high acceleration, allowing its use on lines with steep gradients and/or frequent stops, and a top speed of 70 km/h (43 mph).

=== Operation ===
Like most modern trams, the TFS vehicles are one-person-operated. The driver is responsible for monitoring activity on board, including the operation of the doors. In most versions of the TFS, a single lever controls both acceleration and braking and contain an integrated dead man's switch. The versions used in Saint-Etienne, though, use pedals, consistent with the earlier PCC trams. The tramcars are equipped with land-train radios and ICS, infrared SAM and onboard pointwork control.

== Fleet ==
Currently, TFS or TFS-derived trams are used on all lines of the tramway networks in Nantes, Grenoble, and Saint Etienne, as well as on Île-de-France tramway Line 1 operated by the RATP north of Paris. They had formerly operated on Île-de-France tramway Line 2 west of Paris and in Rouen until they were replaced by Alstom Citadis trams in 2002 and 2012, respectively. The TFS trams on Paris line 2 were moved to line 1, and the ex-Rouen trams were sent to Gaziantep, Turkey in 2014.

Network	Scheme	Year built	Type	Number of cars	Car numbers
Nantes	1	1985	TFS-1	20	301-320
Nantes	2	1988	TFS-1	8	321-328
Nantes	3	1991-1992	TFS-1	6	329-334
Nantes	4	1993-1994	TFS-1	12	335-346
Grenoble	1	1987	TFS-2	20	2001-2020
Grenoble	2	1989	TFS-2	15	2021-2035
Grenoble	3	1991-1992	TFS-2	3	2036-2038
Grenoble	4	1995-1997	TFS-2	15	2039-2053
Rouen	2	1994 (withdrawn 2012)	TFS-2 (now used in Gaziantep)	28	801-828
Saint-Étienne	1	1991	TFS-2 derivative	15	901-915
Saint-Étienne	2	1998	TFS-2 derivative	20	916-935
RATP	1	1992	TFS-2 (line 1)	17	101-117
RATP	2	1996-1997	TFS-2 (line 1, used on line 2)	18	118-119 & 201-216
