= Reserved track =

Track reserved for trams

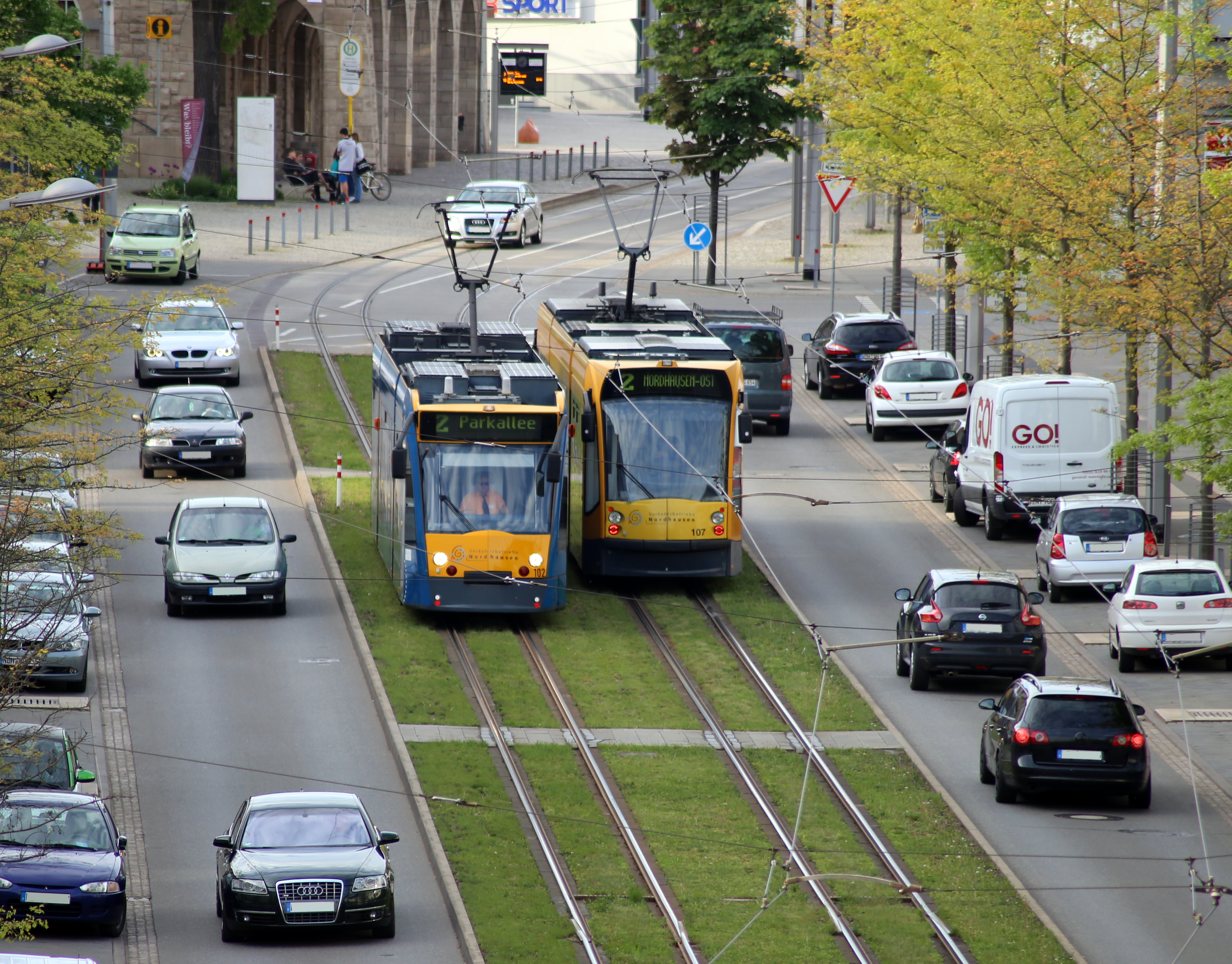
Two trams operating on reserved green track in Nordhausen, Germany

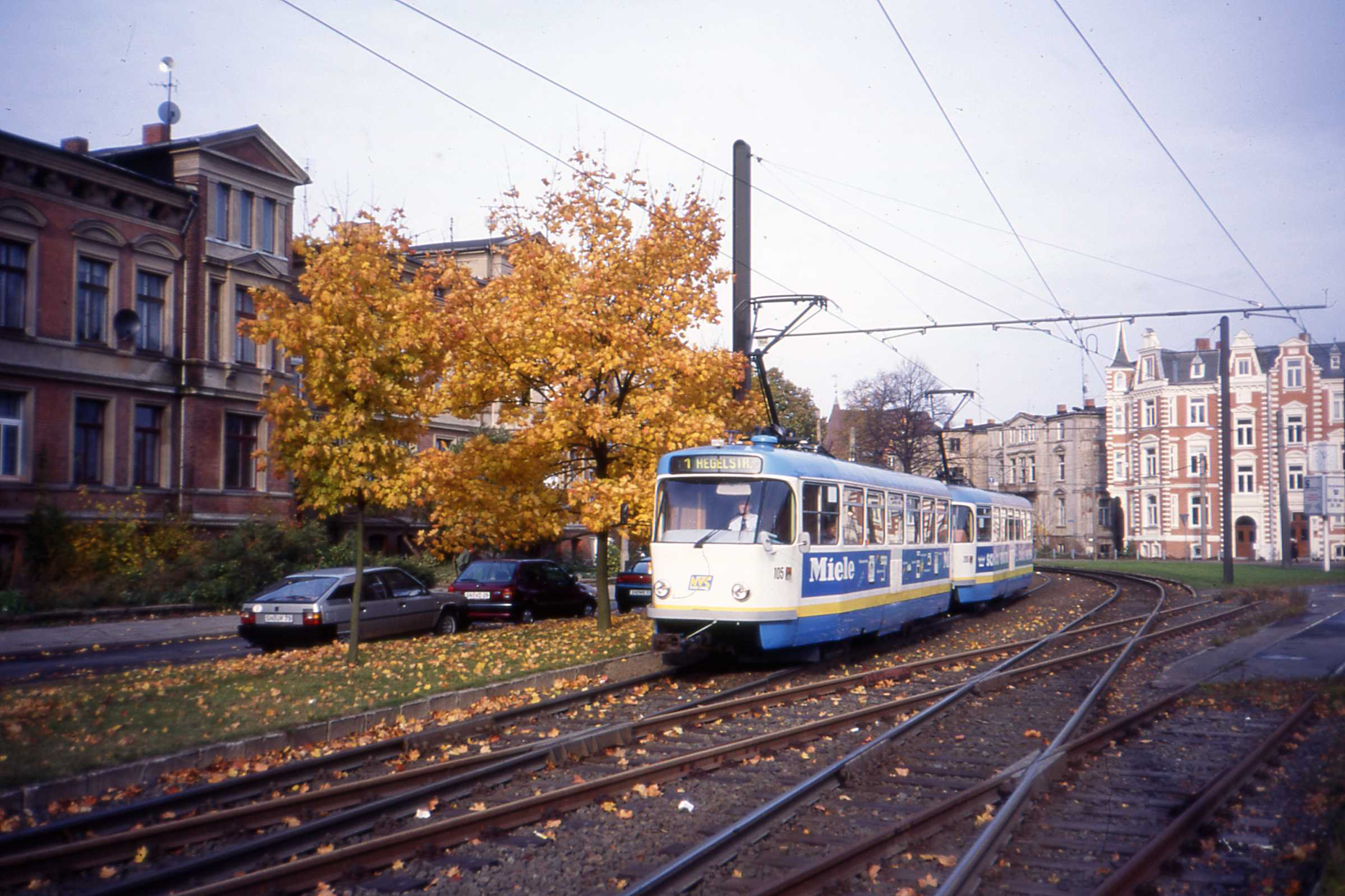
Tram on reserved track in Schwerin, Germany

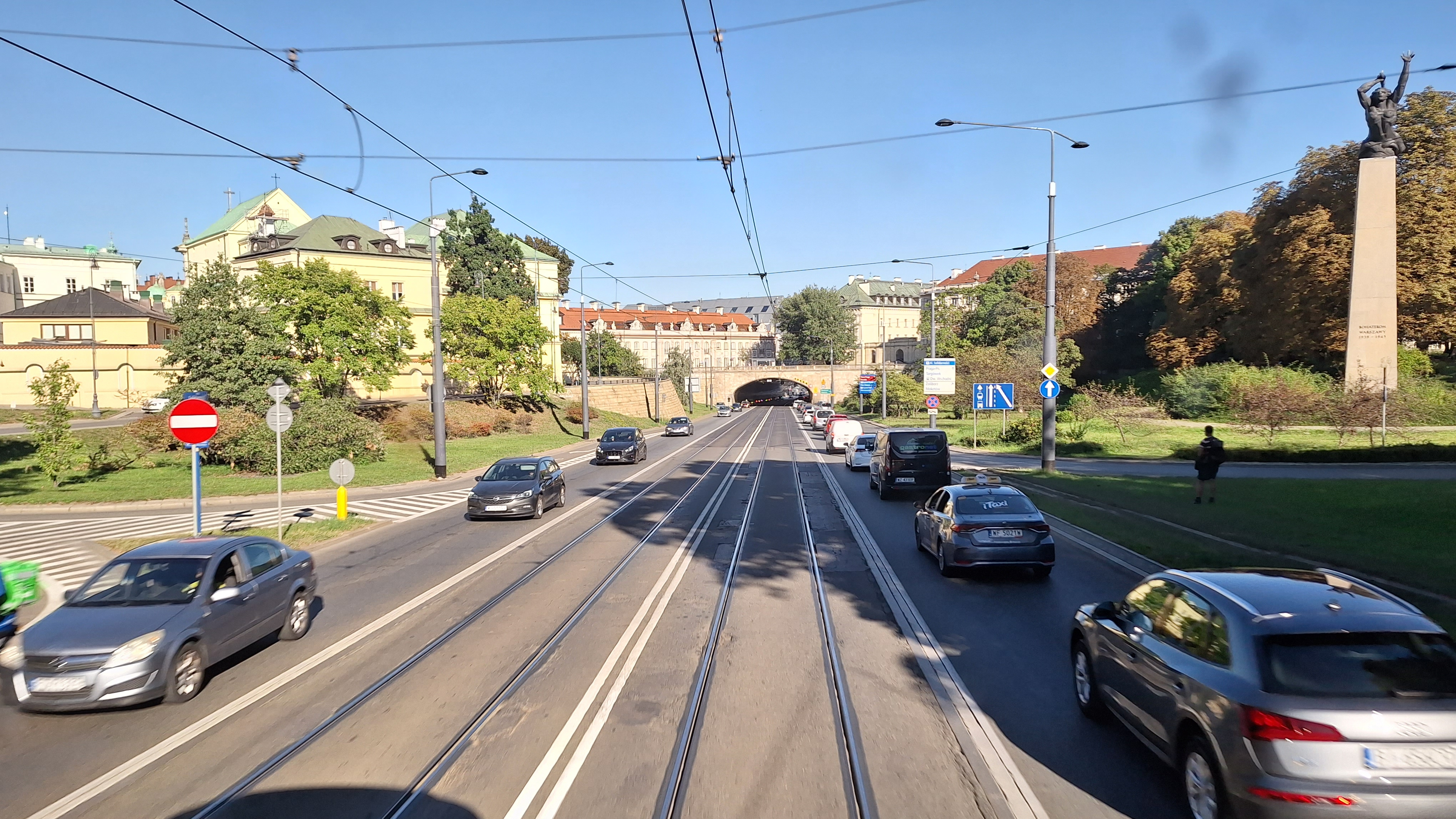
Semi-reserved track for trams and buses in Warsaw, Poland

Reserved track, in tram transport terminology, is track on ground exclusively for trams. This can be in the form of a dedicated part of a street, or a reserved section of tracks that are isolated from other traffic.

== Description ==
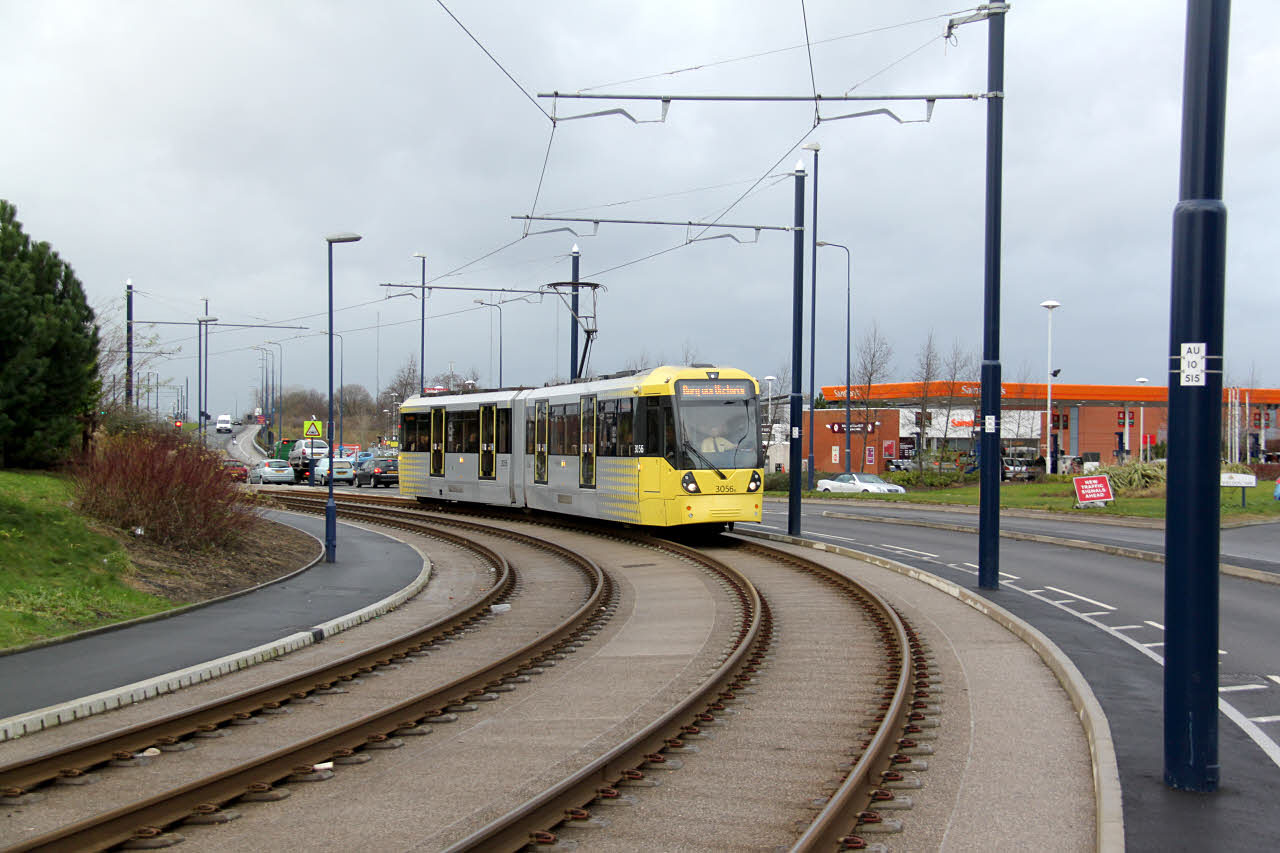
Tram on a reserved track section on the Manchester Metrolink

Unlike a street running track embedded in streets and roads, a reserved track does not need to accommodate the transit of other wheeled vehicles, pedestrians, bicyclists, or horses. It is the cheapest form of tram track to install (not counting land acquisition costs) and is usually constructed like a railway track with conventional sleepers (railroad ties).

Many modern tramway/light-rail systems operate on reserved track that was formerly part of a heavy-rail network. Some examples of these are: in Manchester, London, Nottingham (UK), Sydney, Melbourne, and Adelaide (Australia).

Tram transport tracks can be either reserved or street-running.

== Semi-reserved track ==
An intermediate form, whereby tramlines are laid in the middle of a road, and segregated from other road users either by being raised approximately 10 centimeters above street level, and/or with small studs, or simply by a painted white line. This space is normally for trams only, or for trams, buses, taxis, and emergency vehicles. However, ordinary traffic may cross into the tram lane to pass parked vehicles. In Belgium this is known as a bijzondere overrijdbare bedding or site spécial franchissable. The tram lane may be roughened by paving it with cobbles as an additional deterrent to use by rubber-tired vehicles.

== See also ==
- Street running, where trams or other vehicles share a right of way on a road or street
- Tramway track
