= Alphonse Du Breuil =

French botanist (1811–1890)

Alphonse Du Breuil or Dubreil (21 October 1811 – May 1890) was a French botanist and horticulturist. He was born and died in Rouen. In the Jardin des Plantes de Rouen he started the first school for the care of fruit trees. From 1853 he was professor of arboriculture at the Conservatoire des arts et métiers in Paris, and from 1848 was professor of agriculture at the École d'Agriculture.

== Biography ==
In 1848, he was professor of agriculture at the School of Agriculture and Rural Economy of the Department of the Seine-Maritime, as well as professor of arboriculture at the Jardin des Plantes de Rouen and in charge of the Primary Normal School of Rouen. He presented to the minister of agriculture and trade a draft decree for the teaching of horticulture which, however, remained unfulfilled.

In 1853, he was a professor of arboriculture at the National Conservatory of Works and Arts Conservatoire des arts et métiers in Paris. He was charged by the Ministry of Agriculture to provide lectures on fruit growing for all district departments who desired them. He gave this course up until 1870. In 1867, he and Jean Darcel were made chief engineers of the Department of Bridges and Roads, responsible among other duties for the provision of gardens, footpaths, walkways and promenades in the city of Paris, along with responsibility for the municipal and departmental arboriculture for the whole city region of Paris. He was the founder of what was to become the Ecole Du Breuil.

He retired in 1883. He died in Rouen in May 1890.

== Publications ==
- Culture perfectionnée et moins coûteuse du vignoble, (Advanced and least expensive culture for the vineyard), Paris: Garnier, Masson, 1863. (This is a most comprehensive treatise on viticulture.)
- Les Vignobles et les arbres à fruits à cidre. L'olivier, le noyer, le mûrier et autres espèces économiques (Vineyards and cider fruit trees. The olive tree, walnut, mulberry and other economic species), Paris: Masson, Garnier, 1875. (An important course on agriculture.)

Other Works:

- Amélioration des cidres, copie d'une lettre adressée à M. le préfet de la Seine-Inférieure (Improvement of ciders, copy of a letter addressed to the prefect of Seine-Inférieure) by A. du Breuil and J. Girardin. Rouen: Printed by N. Periaux, 1841, 6 pages.
- Note sur deux nouvelles formes applicables aux arbres fruitiers en espaliers (Note on two new forms to apply for espalier fruit trees). By A. Du Breuil. A Paper read at the 'Central Society of Horticulture' of Rouen at its meeting of 3 September 1842. Rouen: Printed by Vve F. Marie, [1842], 11 pages.
- Protestation contre l'élévation des droits sur le cidre et le poiré à l'octroi de Rouen, (Protest against the rise in duty on cider . . . in Rouen'), signed: J. Girardin, Alph. Du Breuil. Rouen: Printed by A. Papp, [1844],7 pages.
- Enquête sur le cidre faite à Saint-Pierre-sur-Dives, le 6 octobre 1845 (Investigation on the cider made in Saint-Pierre-sur-Dives, on 6 October 1845, and led by Messrs. J. Girardin and Du Breuil, members of the Association, professors at the Provincial School of Agriculture of Seine-Inférieure, etc.,) Caen: printed by H. Le Roy, 1846, 41 pages. Illustrations: thumbnail on title page and 4 plates, in the text.
- Cours élémentaire théorique et pratique d'arboriculture, contenant l'étude des pépinières d'arbres et d'arbrisseaux forestiers, fruitiers et d'ornement; celle des plantations d'alignement forestières et d'ornement; la culture spéciale des arbres à fruits à cidre et de ceux à fruits de table; précédé de quelques notions d'anatomie et de physiologie végétales; ouvrage destiné aux élèves des écoles normales primaires, aux propriétaires et aux jardiniers du nord, de l'est et de l'ouest de la France. ("Basic theoretical and practical Course on Arboriculture, containing the study of trees and shrubs, fruit and ornamental nurseries; forest plantations of alignment and ornament; the special cultivation of fruit ciders and table fruits; preceded by a few notions of Anatomy and Plant Physiology; a book for students of normal schools, for homeowners and gardeners of the North, East and West of France "). By A. Du Breuil. Paris: Victor Masson and Langlois and Leclercq, 1846, 613 pages, with frontispiece and figures in the text.
- With Jean Pierre Louis Girardin, Cours élémentaires d'agriculture (Elementary course of agriculture), Paris: Langlois and Leclercq, and V. Masson, 1850–1852, 2 volumes.
- Des moyens de combattre le blanc de la vigne (Of ways to combat the 'white' of the vine (Oidium Tuckeri) ). Du Breuil. Paris: Printed by E. Duverger. Undated [1851]. 4 pages, with figures (Extracted from the Revue horticol (Horticultural Journal), 1 August 1851.)
- Instruction élémentaire sur la conduite des arbres fruitiers (Basic training on the cultivation of fruit trees) by Mr. A. Du Breuil. Paris: Langlois and Leclercq, 1854, 180 pages, with figures in the text.
- Cours élémentaire d'arboriculture et de viticulture, résumé du cours public gratuit fait par M. André Menet. ("Elementary Course of arboriculture and viticulture, a summary of the free public course done by Mr. André Menet"). Mulhouse: Printed by P. Baker, 1859, 88 pages.
- Culture des arbres et arbrisseaux à fruits de table (Culture of trees and shrubs for table fruit) by Mr. A. Du Breuil. Paris: V. Masson and sons, 1868, 737 pages, with figures in the text.
- Cours d'arboriculture professé à la Société d'horticulture de Saint-Quentin (Course of arboriculture as professed by the 'Society of Horticulture' of Saint-Quentin), by Mr. Du Breuil, and a summary by Mr. Georges Lecocq. Saint-Quentin: printed by L. Magnier Sons, 1873, 86 pages.
- Époque relative du bourgeonnement des principaux cépages français (Relative time of the budding of the main French grape varieties), by A. Du Breuil. Paris: J. Tremblay, 1880, 12 pages. (Excerpted from the Annales de l'Institut national agronomique, number 3, 1878–1879).
- Principes généraux d'arboriculture. Anatomie et physiologie végétales. Agents de la végétation. Pépinières. Greffes (General principles of arboriculture. Plant Anatomy and Physiology. Agents of vegetation. Nurseries. Transplants). By Mr A. Du Breuil. Paris: G. Masson and Garnier brothers, 1884, 267 pages, with figures in the text.
