= Jardin des Plantes de Rouen =

Botanical garden in Upper Normandy, France

Coordinates: 49.4221°N 1.0771°E

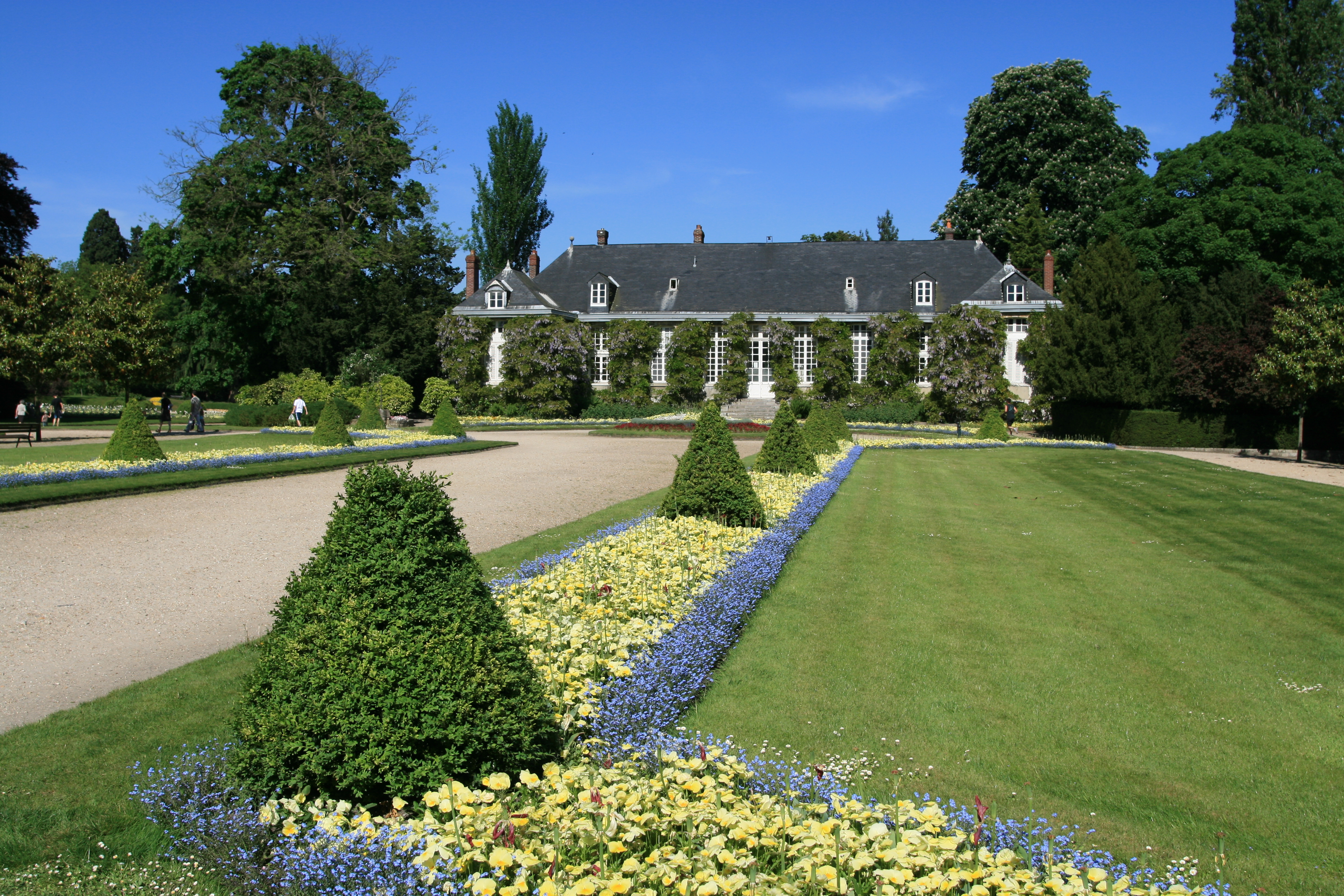
Jardin des Plantes de Rouen

The Jardin des Plantes de Rouen (8 hectares) is a municipal botanical garden located at 7, rue de Trianon, Rouen, Seine-Maritime, Upper Normandy, France. It is open daily without charge.

The garden dates to 1691 when Louis de Carel acquired forest land within which he built a walled garden and pavilion. Scottish banker John Law purchased the garden in 1719, and in 1741, after several other owners, it was opened to the public. In 1806 Sophie Blanchard made a solo balloon ascension from the grounds, in 1811 Napoleon purchased the garden to establish the Sénatorie de la Seine-Inférieure, and in 1817 Élisa Garnerin parachuted from a balloon launched on the site. In 1820 English horticulturist Alfred Crace Calvert set up greenhouses for dahlias. The municipality of Rouen purchased the site in 1832 for its botanical garden, to designs by Désiré Lejeune and construction by Guillaume Dubreuil, which in 1840 opened to the public as the Jardin des Plantes. In 2004 the garden was recognized by the Association des jardins botaniques de France et des pays francophones.

Today the garden contains over 5600 plant taxa, representing 600 species, with a notable collection of fuchsias (991 varieties). It contains a rock garden (1300 m²), garden of iris and hemerocallis (450 m²), rose garden (670 m²), squares of medicinal plants (60 plants), as well as an orchard and collections of aromatic and carnivorous plants.

Buildings include an orangery, the central greenhouse (1839-1842), seven additional greenhouses (1883-1884) including a palmarium, and tropical greenhouses (1936-1938). The garden also contains statues of local writer Eugène Noël (1816-1899) and a runic stone from Norway placed in 1911.

== See also ==
- List of botanical gardens in France

== Bibliography ==
- Jules Bouteiller, Le Jardin des plantes de Rouen, Julien, Rouen, 1856.
- Georges Vanier, "Les Anciens Jardins des plantes de Rouen", in Bulletin des Amis des monuments rouennais, 1935-1938.
- Alfred Morel, "Le Pavillon XVIIIe siècle du Jardin des Plantes", in Bulletin des Amis des monuments rouennais, 2002, pages 81–84.
- Gilles Triolier, "Plongée au cœur du Jardin des plantes", in Paris-Normandie, 11 avril 2006. ISSN 0999-2154
- Bernard Boullard, Plantes et arbres remarquables des rues, squares et jardins de Rouen, AREHN, PTC, 2006, pages 69–72. ISBN 2-35038-016-5.
