= Les Essarts-le-Roi =

- Commune
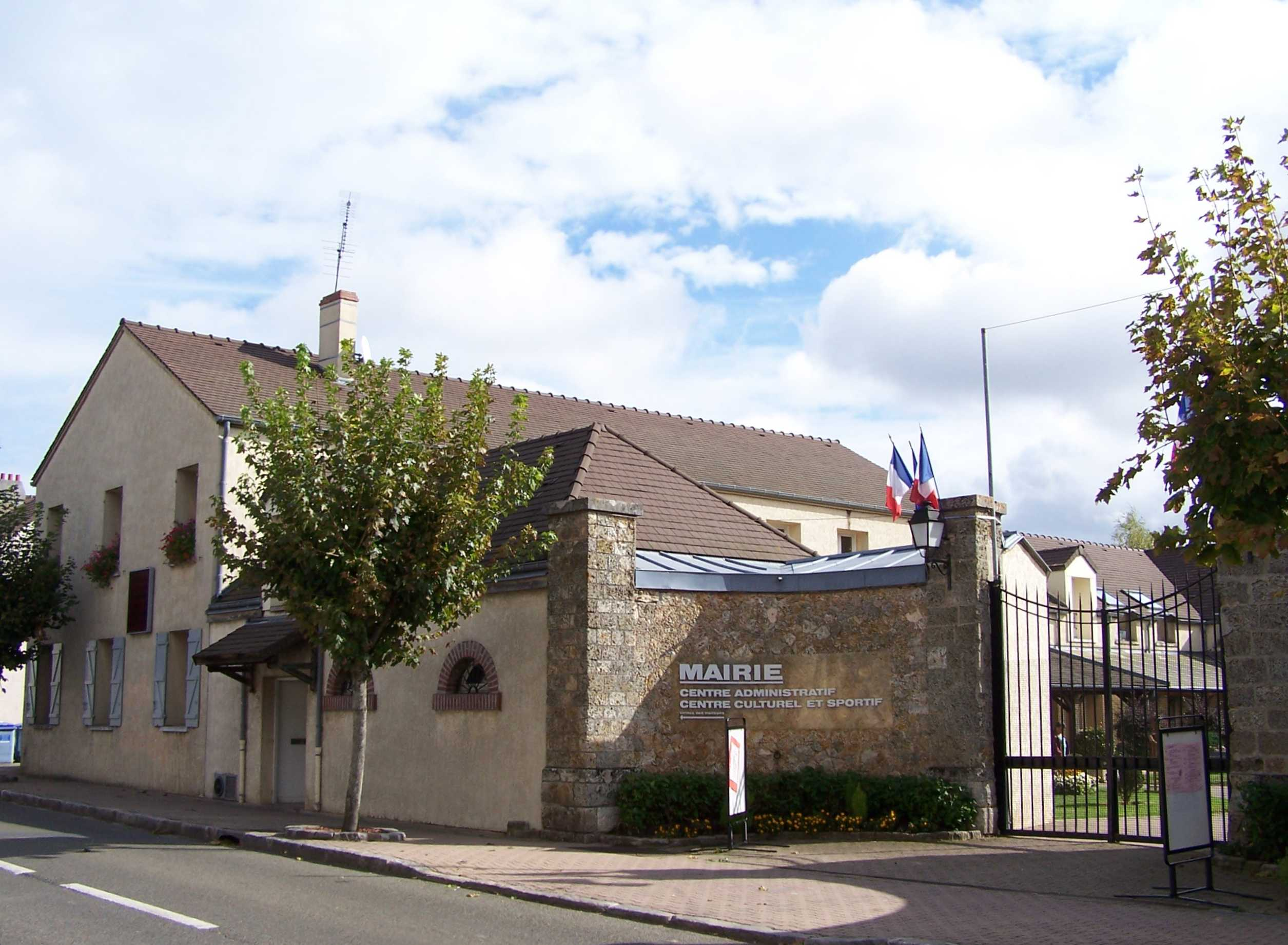
- Town hall

- Coat of arms
- Location of Les Essarts-le-Roi
- Location within France Location within Île-de-France (region)
- Coordinates: 48°43′03″N 1°53′43″E
- Country: France
- Region: Île-de-France
- Department: Yvelines
- Arrondissement: Rambouillet
- Canton: Rambouillet
- Intercommunality: CA Rambouillet Territoires

Government
  - Mayor (2020–2026): Ismaël Nehlil
- Area^{1}: 19.32 km^{2} (7.46 sq mi)
- Elevation: 173 m (568 ft)
- Highest elevation: 181 m (594 ft)
- Lowest elevation: 115 m (377 ft)
- Population (2023): 6,831
  - Density: 353.6/km^{2} (915.7/sq mi)
- Time zone: UTC+01:00 (CET)
  - Summer (DST): UTC+02:00 (CEST)
- INSEE/Postal code: 78220 /78690
- ^{1} French Land Register data, which excludes lakes, ponds, glaciers > 1 km^{2} (0.386 sq mi or 247 acres) and river estuaries.

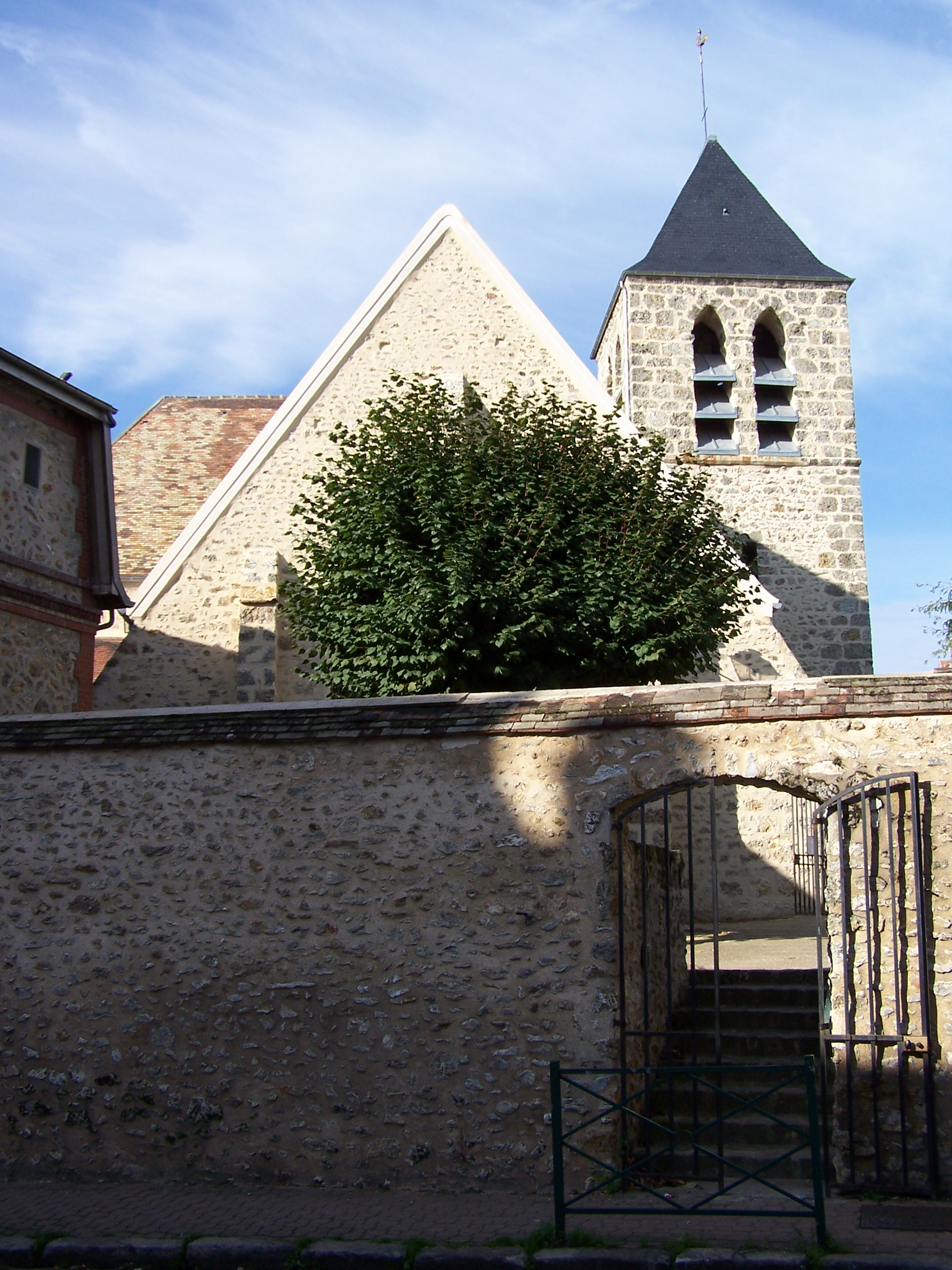
Church of Saint Corneille and Saint Cyprien

Les Essarts-le-Roi (French pronunciation: [lez‿esaʁ lə ʁwa]) is a commune in the Yvelines department in the Île-de-France in north-central France.

== Geography ==
Les Essarts-le-Roi is bordered by Coignières and Lévis-Saint-Nom to the northeast, Dampierre-en-Yvelines to the east, Senlisse to the southeast, Auffargis to the south, Le Perray-en-Yvelines to the southwest, Les Bréviaires to the west and Saint-Rémy-l'Honoré to the north.

== History ==
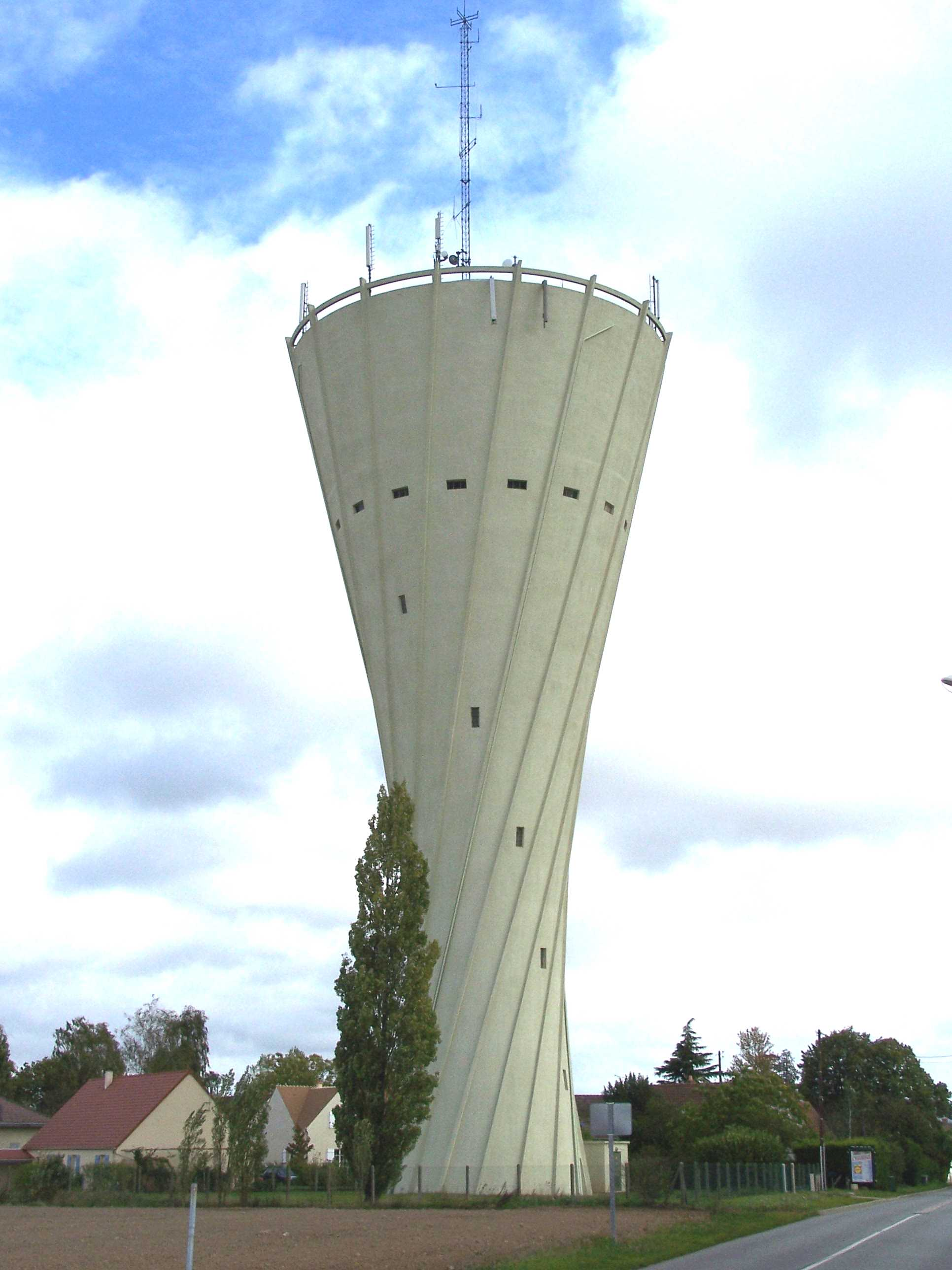
The Les Essarts-le-Roi château d'eau (water tower) is a hyperboloid structure.

An imperial decree in 1814 led to the creation of the commune of Les Essarts-le-Roi by combining the former communes of Essarts and Des Layes.

In 1944, the young Paris-born boy Eddy Palacci received French Resistance radio transmissions for three Allied officers, so they could receive their instructions on when and where to sabotage French railway against Nazi occupying forces.

== Demographics ==
Since the 1980s, Les Essarts-le-Roi has been home to a large number of Vietnamese, who mostly arrived in France following the Vietnam War. While refugees initially settled in Paris, the suburbanization and growing affluence of the population resulted in many moving to outer communes of the Île-de-France region.

Historical population
Year	Pop.	±% p.a.
1968	2,045	—
1975	3,254	+6.86%
1982	4,876	+5.95%
1990	5,565	+1.67%
1999	6,126	+1.07%
2007	6,200	+0.15%
2012	6,513	+0.99%
2017	6,708	+0.59%
2023	6,831	+0.30%
Source: INSEE

== Education ==
The commune has two preschools, Ecole maternelle de La Romanie and Ecole maternelle Pré-Gallot, and two elementary schools, Ecole élémentaire René Coudoint and Ecole élémentaire Roger COLART. Junior high school students are assigned to Collège Les Molières; As of 2016 it has 800 students. Students attend Lycée Louis Bascan in nearby Rambouillet.

== See also ==
- Communes of the Yvelines department
