= Jouars-Pontchartrain =

- Commune
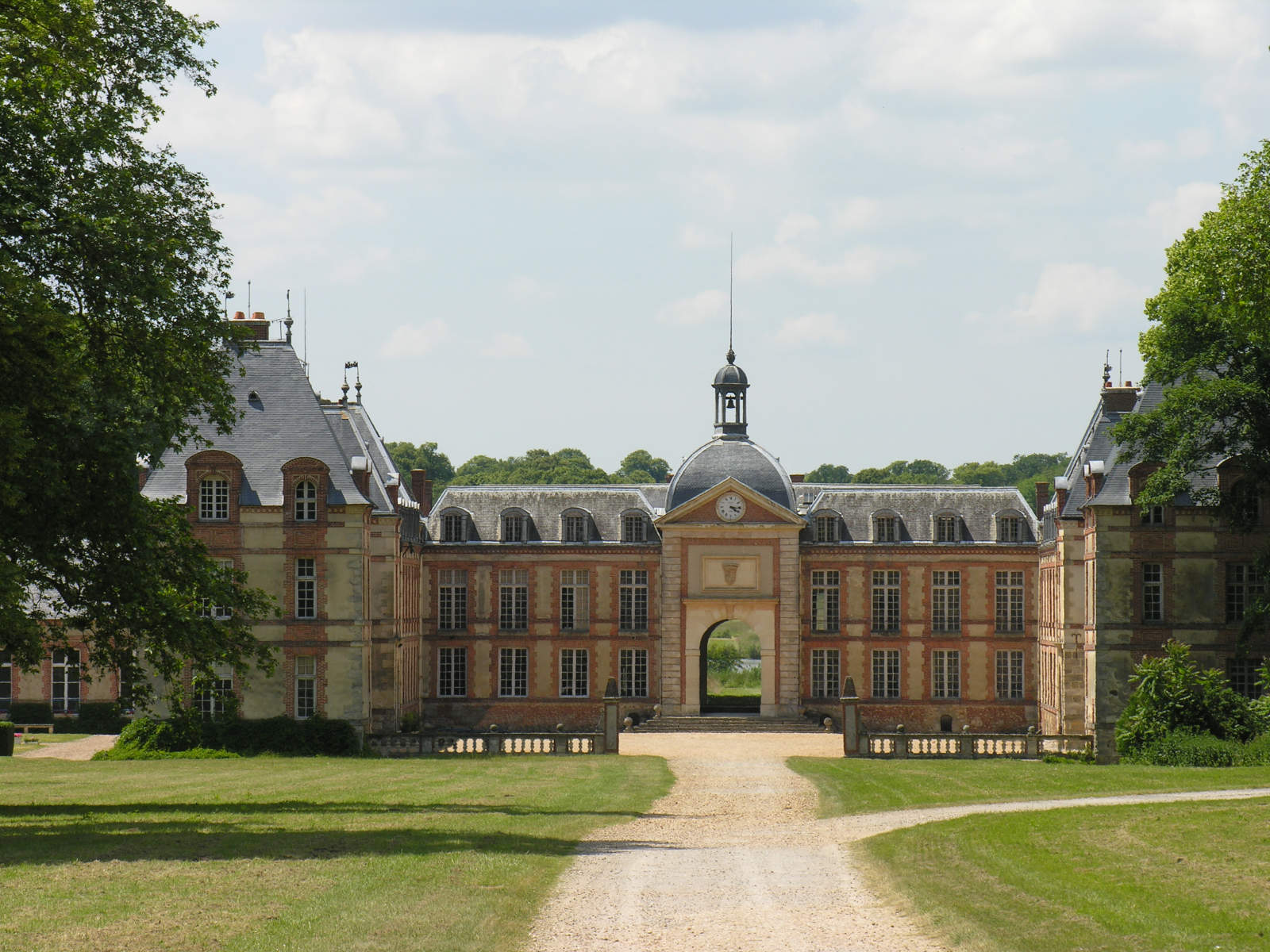
- Castle of Pontchartrain

- Coat of arms
- Location of Jouars-Pontchartrain
- Location within France Location within Île-de-France (region)
- Coordinates: 48°48′14″N 1°54′08″E
- Country: France
- Region: Île-de-France
- Department: Yvelines
- Arrondissement: Rambouillet
- Canton: Aubergenville
- Intercommunality: Cœur d'Yvelines

Government
  - Mayor (2023–2026): Thomas Mengelle-Touya
- Area^{1}: 9.65 km^{2} (3.73 sq mi)
- Elevation: 112 m (367 ft)
- Highest elevation: 171 m (561 ft)
- Lowest elevation: 67 m (220 ft)
- Population (2023): 6,039
  - Density: 626/km^{2} (1,620/sq mi)
- Time zone: UTC+01:00 (CET)
  - Summer (DST): UTC+02:00 (CEST)
- INSEE/Postal code: 78321 /78760
- ^{1} French Land Register data, which excludes lakes, ponds, glaciers > 1 km^{2} (0.386 sq mi or 247 acres) and river estuaries.

Jouars-Pontchartrain (French pronunciation: [ʒwaʁ pɔ̃ʃaʁtʁɛ̃]) is a commune in the Yvelines department in the Île-de-France region in north-central France. It is approximately 35 kilometres from Paris. This city is famous for the Château de Pontchartrain.

== Geography ==
The town of Jouars-Pontchartrain is located 35 km west of Paris, 18 km west of Versailles and 22 km from Rambouillet, on a buttress which delimits the western end of the plain of Versailles and at the foot from which begins the plain of Montfort-l'Amaury. Its territory is irrigated by the Mauldre whose south-north oriented course follows the eastern limit of the town and receives in the park of the Château de Pontchartrain the Élancourt brook, a diversion of which feeds its pond. This brook, oriented east-west, is enlarged a little upstream by the Maurepas brook which joins it at Chennevières.

=== Hamlets of the municipality ===
The commune comprises seven hamlets:

- Pontchartrain, in the north of the municipal territory, heart of the municipality, where are located, around the town hall, the Saint-Lin church and the Saint-Louis hospital, the majority of local shops and most of housing.
- Chennevières, south-east of Pontchartrain and adjoining it. It is a residential and old hamlet, formerly a humid places where the culture of hemp prospered.
- La Richarderie, to the east of Chennevières and adjoining it, is a semi-residential, semi-rural hamlet.
- Jouars, away to the south of Pontchartrain, has a church and has only a few dwellings and rural farms.
- Ergal, in the far east and on the edge of the municipal territory is adjoining the hamlet of Launay in the municipality of Élancourt, half-residential, half-rural.
- Les Mousseaux, south of Jouars, on the edge of the municipal territory and adjoining the hamlet of Villeneuve (parc aux Loups) in the municipality of Maurepas, is half-residential, half-rural with a few small craft businesses.
- La Dauberie, a very wooded residential area, is on the edge of Saint-Rémy-l'Honoré.

The last two hamlets form a kind of enclave between the municipal territories of Maurepas, Coignières, Saint-Rémy-l'Honoré and Le Tremblay-sur-Mauldre.

== Population ==
Historical population
Year	Pop.	±% p.a.
1968	2,159	—
1975	2,549	+2.40%
1982	3,774	+5.77%
1990	4,282	+1.59%
1999	4,569	+0.72%
2007	5,145	+1.50%
2012	5,289	+0.55%
2017	5,658	+1.36%
2023	6,039	+1.09%
Source: INSEE

== Monuments ==
- The Château de Pontchartrain built in the 17th century. It was held for many years by the family Phélypeaux.
- St Martin's Church from the 12th century.
- St-Lin's church from the beginning of the 20th century.
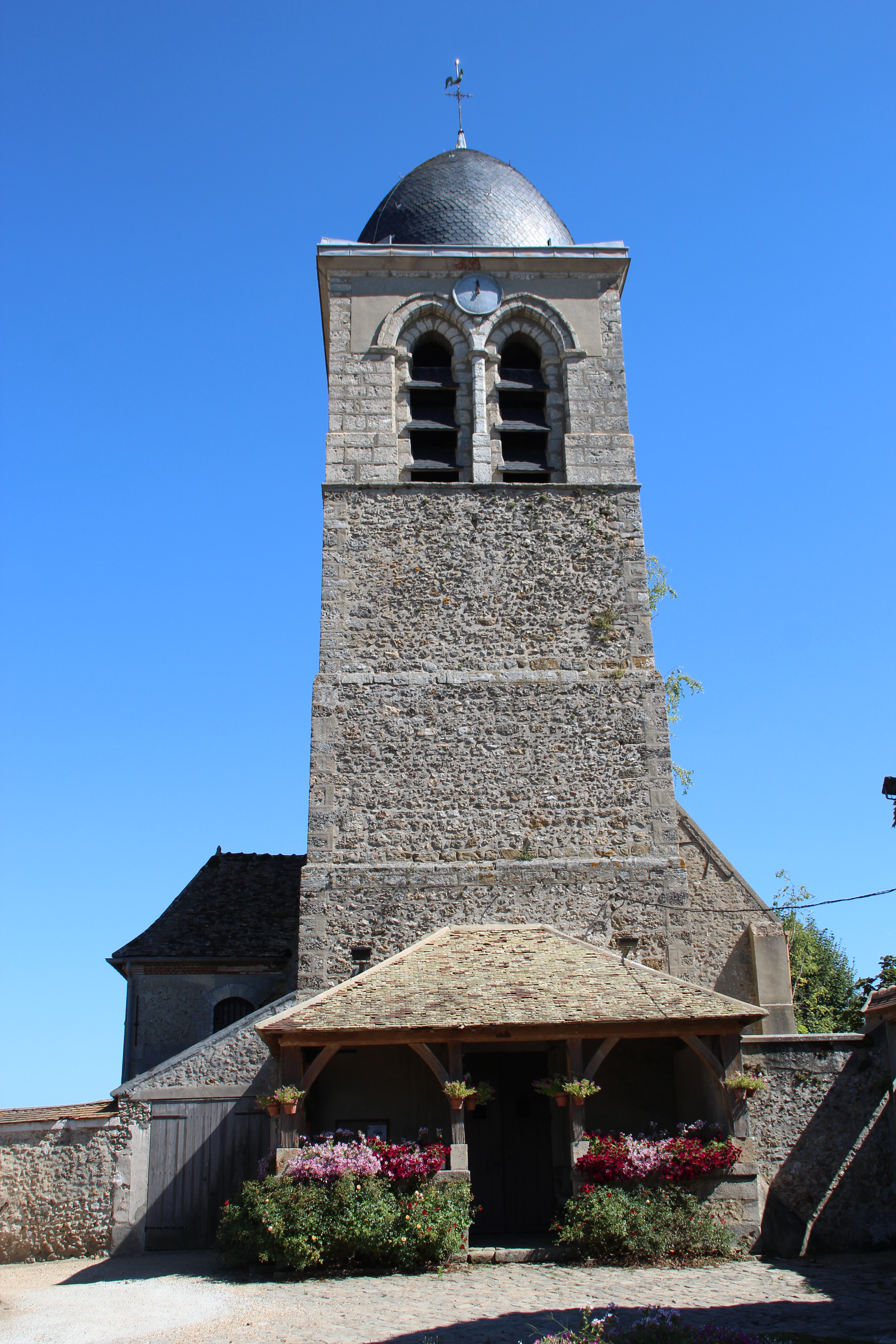
Entrance of St Martin's Church .

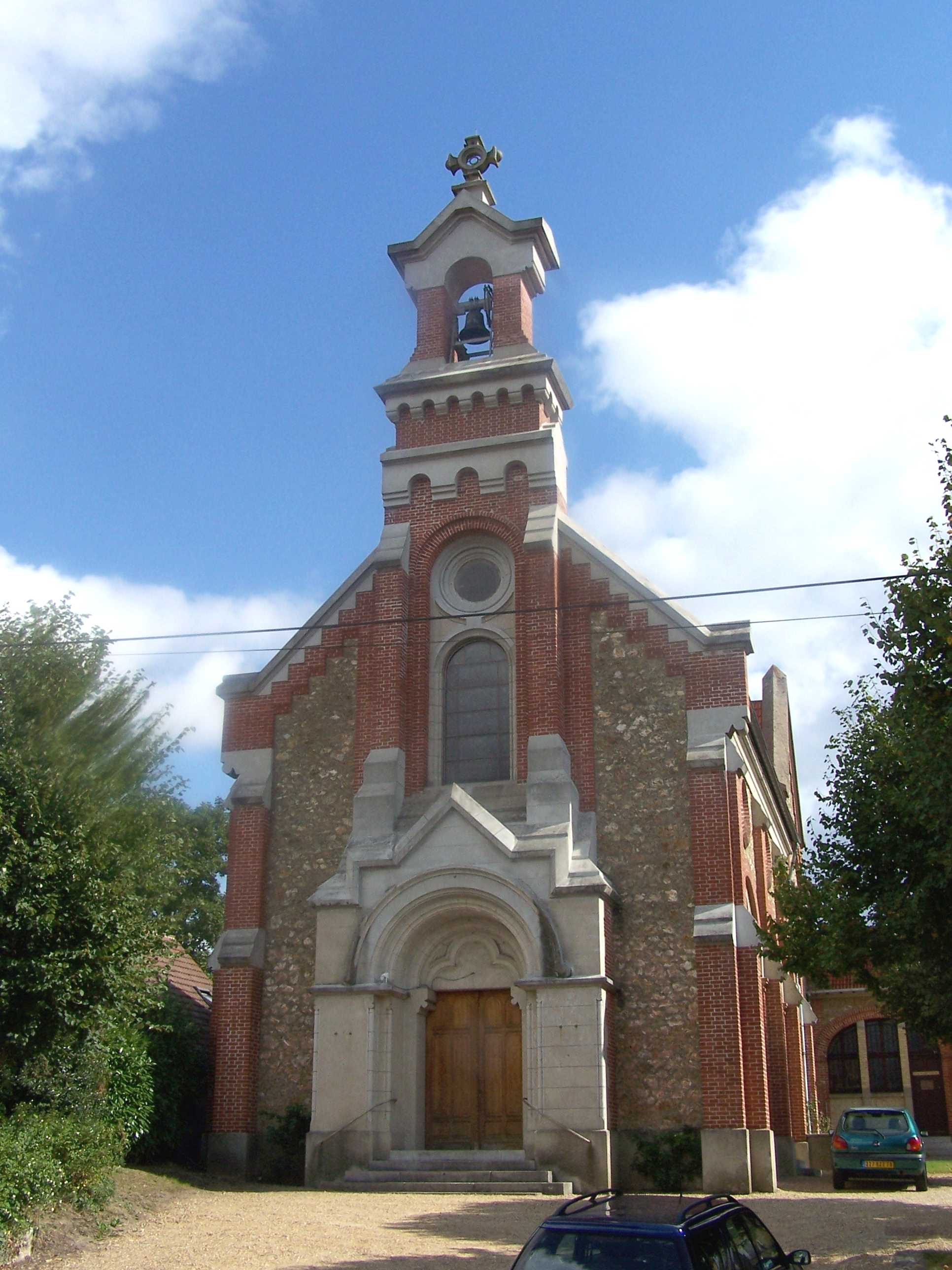
St-Lin's church.

The farm of the Ithe, located on the banks of the Mauldre and to the west of the hamlet of Jouars corresponds to an ancient Gallo-Roman settlement called Diodurum or Divo durum, one of the largest secondary settlements recorded in Île-de-France. This site, prospected since the middle of the 20th century. The data show that it occupies an area of approximately 40 ha. The recognized chronological sequence, from the beginning of the 1st century BC to the 5th-6th centuries, and the very good preservation of the archaeological levels associated with a humid context make it an exceptional site. The settlement developed in the valley of La Mauldre, at the crossroads of several roads leading to other Gallo-Roman settlements: Le Vieil-Évreux, Dreux, Chartres, Orléans, Sens, Paris, Beauvais. It is a vicus as attested by a fragment of an inscription. As a large crossroad located on the borders of the territory of the Carnutes, near Belgian Gaul and possessing pre-urban characteristics, this vicus is one of the assumptions for the consecrated place of the druids assembly mentioned by Caesar.

== Twin towns ==
- Hammond, Louisiana, United States
- Cella, Spain

== See also ==
- Communes of the Yvelines department
