= Anne Bergantz =

French politician (born 1968)

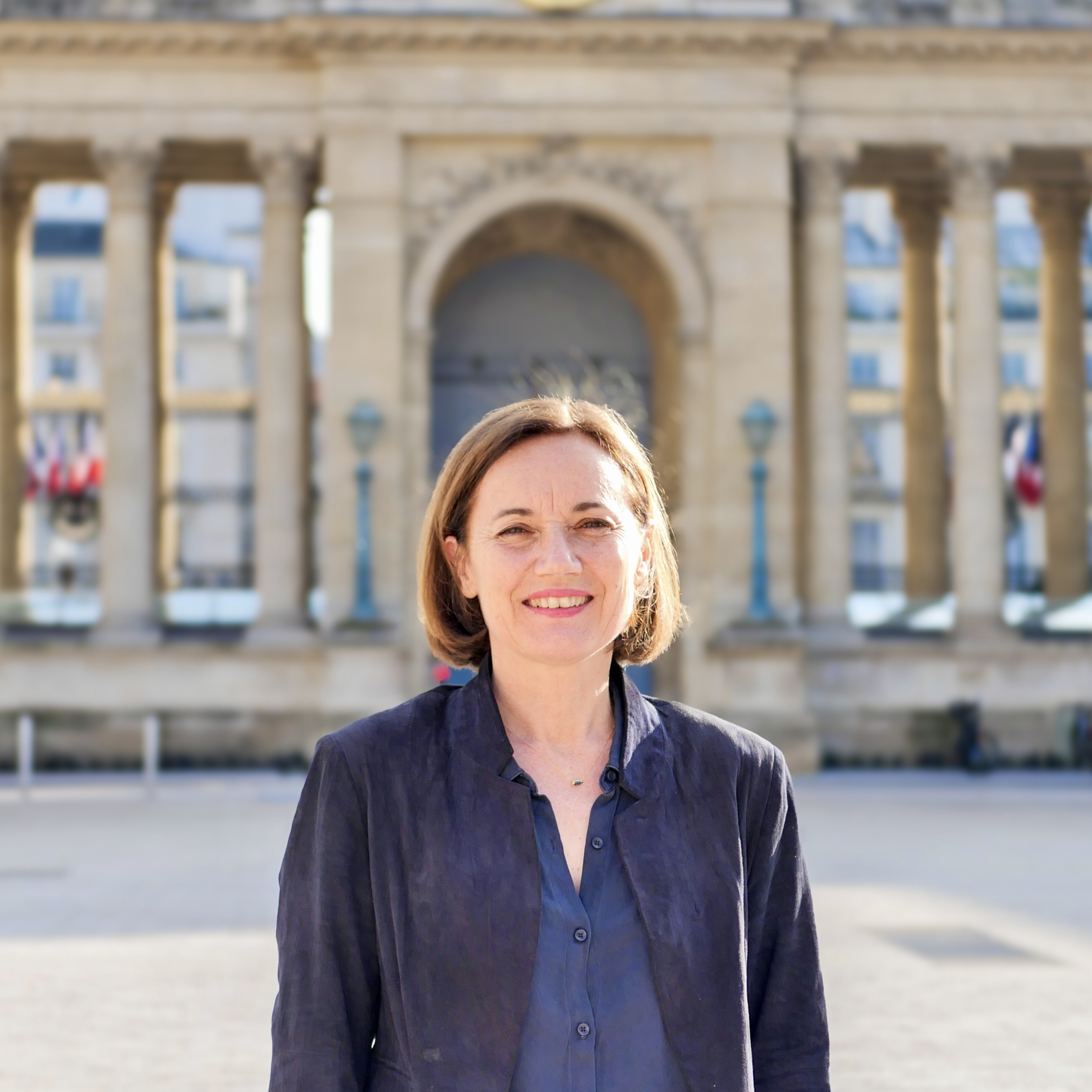
- Bergantz in 2024

Member of the French National Assembly for Yvelines's 2nd constituency
- Incumbent
- Assumed office 22 October 2024
- Preceded by: Jean-Noël Barrot
- In office 10 November 2022 – 9 June 2024
- Preceded by: Jean-Noël Barrot
- Succeeded by: Jean-Noël Barrot

Personal details
- Born: 17 September 1968 (age 57)
- Party: Democratic Movement

Anne Bergantz (born 17 September 1968) is a French politician. She has been a member of the National Assembly since 2024, having previously served from 2022 to 2024. She has been a municipal councillor of Lévis-Saint-Nom since 2018.
