= 2026 Trappes and La Verrière shootings =

Mass shootings in France

- A CCTV still of the perpetrator at the Esso petrol station
- Municipalities where the shootings occurred
- Location: Trappes and La Verrière, Yvelines, Île-de-France, France
- Date: 23 October 2026 c. 10:00 a.m. (CEST; UTC+02:00)
- Target: Black and Arab people
- Attack type: Mass shooting; spree shooting; drive-by shooting
- Weapons: Sten Mark II submachine gun; Tear gas canisters (unused); Knife (unused)
- Deaths: 1
- Injuries: 7 (4 seriously)
- Motive: Racism and Islamophobia; Desire to avenge shopkeepers robbed during the 17 October riots
- Accused: Kevin Tessier

On 23 October 2026, a 39-year-old man allegedly perpetrated a racially motivated shooting spree in Trappes and La Verrière, two neighbouring communes in the Yvelines department of France, west of Paris. Firing from a car at several locations, the attacker killed one man and injured seven other people, including a 12-year-old girl. Police arrested the suspect in nearby Coignières shortly afterwards.

French president Emmanuel Macron described the shootings as a racist terrorist attack. The National Anti-Terrorism Prosecutor's Office (PNAT) opened an investigation into murder and attempted murder in connection with terrorism, with an aggravating circumstance relating to the victims' actual or perceived racial, ethnic, national or religious background. Investigators were examining the suspect's reported statements about targeting Black and Arab people and whether he had any connections to far-right extremists.

== Background ==
Trappes and La Verrière are neighbouring municipalities in the Saint-Quentin-en-Yvelines area, approximately 30 kilometres (19 mi) west of central Paris. The shootings took place six days after nationwide demonstrations on 17 October 2026, during which some protests were followed by looting and vandalism. In the intervening days, several far-right politicians blamed immigration for the unrest. Investigators subsequently examined whether the suspect's reported references to the looting were connected to the shootings; no connection to a political organisation had been established as of 24 October.

== Shootings ==
The attack began shortly after 10:00 a.m. CEST on 23 October. According to an account of the PNAT's findings published by Europe 1, a man driving a grey Renault Clio fired at a parked vehicle occupied by a mother and her daughter on Avenue Hector-Berlioz in Trappes. Neither occupant was hit. The gunman then fired at the frontage of a medical centre on Rue Gérard-Philipe, without injuring anyone at that location.

He continued towards Square Louis-Pergaud, near Avenue Salvador-Allende, where he fatally shot a 26-year-old man. At an Esso petrol station on Boulevard Martin-Luther-King, he shot and wounded two other people. The attacker subsequently drove into La Verrière and fired in the vicinity of the Bois-de-l'Étang pharmacy and on Rue Marcel-Rivière, where further victims were injured. Witnesses described bursts of gunfire from the moving vehicle.

The shootings lasted approximately 15–20 minutes. Around 10:20 a.m., five officers from the Anti-Crime Brigade (BAC) arrested the suspect near a restaurant beside the N10 in Coignières. Police recovered a Sten submachine gun, a British weapon originally developed during the Second World War, and a tear-gas spray canister from the car. Interior Minister Laurent Nuñez said that the officers' rapid intervention might have prevented further casualties.

== Victims ==
One person was killed and seven were injured, four seriously. The man killed near Square Louis-Pergaud was identified by his martial arts club, Atch Academy in Aubervilliers, as Pengo Bossio Wangi, a 26-year-old amateur mixed martial arts fighter. The club published a tribute describing his enthusiasm and generosity.

Ahmed C., a 21-year-old of Moroccan origin riding a scooter, was seriously wounded by several bullets near the Esso petrol station on boulevard Martin-Luther-King in Trappes. The gunman's weapon jammed; he tried to take refuge in the shop before the shooter changed the magazine. Footage from the surveillance cameras was circulated on social media.

Among the injured was a 12-year-old girl in La Verrière who sustained eight gunshot wounds and was taken to Necker–Enfants Malades Hospital in Paris. On 24 October, the PNAT said that she remained in a critical condition. The other injured people were reported to include a 21-year-old man and a 40-year-old woman in Trappes, and two men in La Verrière.

== Suspect ==
A 39-year-old man, Kevin Tessier, was arrested by police in Coignières shortly after the shootings and placed in police custody. The suspect was a resident of Plaisir. The PNAT stated that his criminal record contained four older convictions for ordinary offences that had been legally rehabilitated. He was taken into police custody after his arrest.

Tessier grew up in the Saules neighbourhood of Guyancourt and his childhood was described as troubled, marked by disruptive behaviour at school. He reportedly suffered from bedwetting and was also diagnosed with dysorthographia and dyslexia. According to his mother's testimony, a psychologist who followed him during childhood described him as "unsociable, hypersensitive and jealous". His difficulties worsened during adolescence. He began using cannabis at the age of 12. His consumption later became heavy, leading to episodes of delusion that resulted in his admission to a psychiatric hospital at the age of 25. Tessier was already known to the police for criminal offences, including theft and shoplifting, drug use and driving under the influence of alcohol. His criminal record contained thirteen entries for ordinary criminal offences, the most recent dating from 2013.

Three days before the attack, Tessier violently assaulted a Black man in the car park of a petrol station in Levallois-Perret, Hauts-de-Seine. The victim said that he had asked Tessier to move his vehicle so that he could refuel, but Tessier refused. After parking, the victim got out of his vehicle and heard someone approaching from behind. As he turned around, he was sprayed in the face with tear gas and then struck repeatedly, breaking several of his teeth. The victim also said that his attacker had directed racist insults at him, saying: "We're going to get rid of you; we've had enough of you." The municipal police quickly arrived at the scene and handcuffed both men, starting with the victim. This prompted accusations of racism against the officers, who were defended by their supervisor, Agnès Pottier-Dumas. After Kevin Tessier admitted spraying the victim and striking him, the victim was released from his handcuffs, while the assailant was taken to the national police station for voluntary questioning and summoned to appear on 23 October 2026, the day of the spree killing. The injured man was taken to hospital for treatment and subsequently filed a complaint that evening for "violence involving the use or threat of a weapon resulting in incapacity for work not exceeding eight days". According to the Nanterre prosecutor's office, surveillance footage from the petrol station was requested on 22 October 2026, but was not sent until 27 October.

According to Romain Ruiz, a lawyer representing one of the victims of the Trappes attack, the decision not to place Tessier in police custody reflected an underestimation of his dangerousness and a police and judicial bias associated with White privilege. Kevin Tessier had also previously threatened to kill several acquaintances from his neighbourhood, as well as the mother of one of them. According to Mediapart, he told one acquaintance, referring to the legal consequences of his actions: "I'll never go to prison; I'll pretend to be insane." The firearms in his possession had been illegally acquired and were undeclared.

According to reports by Mediapart, far-right and Identitarian ideologies characterize Tessier's views. He frequently repeated their rhetoric and conflations verbatim.

Tessier reportedly had a fear of being overwhelmed by immigration. He described the neighbourhood he lived in as pleasant in a 2024 interview with two sociology students. He did not criticize the municipal government, which was led by the miscellaneous left, but said: "There were already a few foreigners when I was little; we all mixed together, but I think emigration (which he often confused with immigration) has increased by an infinite amount in twenty-five years." He regretted being the "only White person [in his] neighbourhood". A petrol-station technician, he was described by those close to him as having been "disturbed" since childhood, dependent on cannabis and experiencing paranoid "delusions", followed by a violent and racist radicalization linked to media and political discourse. In an interview with two sociology students in 2024, revealed by Mediapart, he discussed his racism and the role of the media in shaping his ideology. For him, "The problem is immigration".

Those close to him noted that his drift towards racism had occurred relatively late. As a child, he grew up in a multi-ethnic neighbourhood and had friends of African and North African backgrounds.

He was an avid viewer of 24-hour news channels, agreed with the discourse broadcast on CNews and blamed his personal problems on "Black people and Arabs", foreigners, unemployed people and those receiving social assistance. Such conflations are common on CNews and on the far-right website Fdesouche, which he followed assiduously and shared on his public Facebook wall until 2023, accompanied by racist comments.

An acquaintance from the neighbourhood where he grew up, in the early 2010s, reported that Kevin Tessier was above all antisemitic; "His hatred of Jews was his first hatred." He was drawn to Alain Soral and Dieudonné, regularly watching their videos online and talking about them at length. Believing in a supposed "white genocide", an antisemitic conspiracy theory according to which a "Jewish conspiracy" seeks to weaken other "races", he was fascinated by Amedy Coulibaly, perpetrator of the antisemitic hostage-taking at the Hyper Cacher supermarket in January 2015, and dreamed of carrying out a similar attack.

Being allegedly a reader of Mein Kampf, he was described by one of his female friends as a sad and lonely man who did not hide "his political opinions", voted for the "far right" and made "racist remarks". Based on messages Kevin Tessier sent to members of this former-tenants' group via Facebook Messenger in 2023, including "Come to your senses, Marine [Le Pen] is your friend" and "The RN is not your enemy", Mediapart reported that the attacker "adhered to the ideas of the RN". When questioned by police, members of Tessier's family also described him as racist.

Several of his acquaintances, members of a group of former neighbours who had established a collective vegetable garden, described to Mediapart a man in distress, emotionally isolated and in a precarious economic situation, with poorly paid and difficult jobs. Having been open-minded about a decade earlier, he had, in particular, once had a close Muslim friend, according to Le Monde, he was seen attending events associated with the French left and an event organized by the France Palestine Solidarity Association (AFPS) in 2018. Later, he developed deeply entrenched racist beliefs, which members of the groups were unable to change. During questioning, he denied having any connection with the left: "I've always been on the right; I just infiltrated the leftists at one point."

== Investigation ==
The suspect's detention was extended on 24 October after an initial interview. By that afternoon, four people from his family and social circle, including his mother, had also been detained for questioning. The PNAT said a toxicological blood analysis was being conducted; its findings had not been reported in the prosecutor's statement cited by AFP that afternoon.

During a search of the suspects flat in Plaisir on 23 October, investigators discovered what prosecutors described as a booby-trap arrangement involving three gas cylinders, electrical wiring and a timer. Bomb-disposal specialists and officers from RAID, a French police tactical unit, were deployed. Le Monde also reported that investigators had discovered a copy of Mein Kampf at the flat. Investigators began examining the suspect's electronic devices for possible links to far-right extremist networks; no such connection had been confirmed in the reporting available on 24 October.

The National Anti-Terrorism Prosecutor's Office assumed responsibility for the case on 23 October. It opened an investigation into murder and attempted murder in connection with a terrorist undertaking, with an aggravating circumstance relating to the victims' real or attributed racial, ethnic, national or religious identity. The investigation also encompassed suspected possession of a prohibited military-grade weapon and criminal association connected with the preparation of terrorist offences. These were investigative classifications, not convictions.

According to Le Monde, citing sources familiar with the investigation, the suspect told responding police officers that he had wanted to avenge shopkeepers whose businesses had been looted during demonstrations on 17 October. He reportedly said that he had targeted Black and Arab people. Investigators were examining evidence suggesting that he had selectively fired at people perceived as non-white. The suspect's precise motives and any ideological or organisational affiliations remained under investigation.

== Reactions and aftermath ==
=== Government and political reactions ===
President Emmanuel Macron visited Trappes on the evening of 23 October and characterised the shootings as a racist terrorist attack. He said the assailant had apparently chosen victims on the basis of skin colour or perceived religion, warned about the normalisation of racist rhetoric and urged national unity. Prime Minister Sébastien Lecornu condemned the attack, while Interior Minister Laurent Nuñez described it as a terrorist crime and praised the officers who arrested the suspect.

Ali Rabeh, the mayor of Trappes, called the shootings a racist attack that was probably Islamophobic and appealed for public calm. Nicolas Dainville, the mayor of La Verrière, expressed concern for the injured child and the wider community. Political leaders across the spectrum condemned the attack: Marine Le Pen of the far-right National Rally denounced racism as an abhorrent motive and called for a firm judicial response, while Jean-Luc Mélenchon of La France Insoumise emphasised the deadly consequences of racism.

=== Community response ===
A handwritten memorial sign commemorating the victim of the attack

Residents of Trappes and La Verrière expressed shock and fear following the shootings. A psychological emergency support service was established for witnesses and others affected, and the victim-support association France Victimes 78 was mobilised. The Atch Academy paid tribute to Wangi, and fellow mixed martial arts fighter Salahdine Parnasse also commemorated him publicly.

== See also ==
- Terrorism in France
- Racism in France
- 2026 Kraków shooting, another drive-by spree shooting that occurred in Poland the month after.
