= Laser Quest =

British indoor laser tag franchise

- Type: Private
- Industry: Laser tag
- Founded: Manchester, United Kingdom (1989)
- Headquarters: Stoke-on-Trent, Staffordshire, United Kingdom.
- Website: laserquest.co.uk

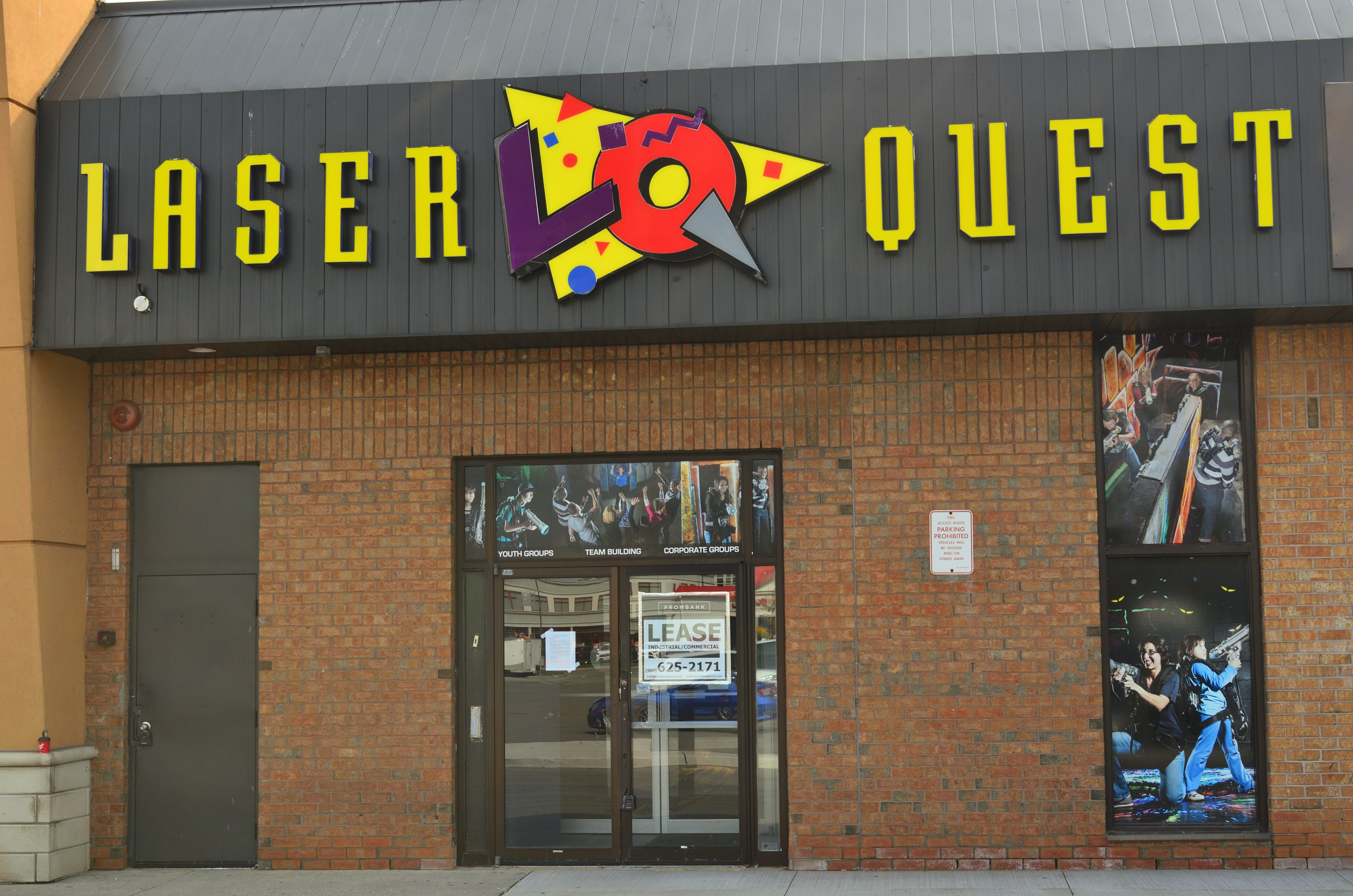
A closed Laser Quest location in Richmond Hill, Ontario

Laser Quest is a British indoor laser tag franchise founded in Manchester, United Kingdom in 1989. Its laser tag games use infrared (IR) hand-held units and vests. Laser Quest's oldest centre is located in Stourbridge, West Midlands, England.

In 1993, Laser Quest had begun operations in North America, where it would operate several locations in the United States and Canada. Its headquarters was located in Mississauga, Ontario. However, in September 2020, due to the COVID-19 pandemic in North America, Laser Quest announced they had ceased operations in North America due to the uncertain economic environment. To this day, Laser Quest continues to operate in the United Kingdom.

== Overview of the game of Laser Quest ==
Lobby

Customers entering the lobby would see a front counter, a few party rooms available to rent for events, some arcade games, vending machines and a doorway to the laser tag arena(often called a maze).

Approaching the counter, the first stop would be "Phase 1". This phase is where players would pay for game, or games, and be told when that game would be. After paying, the staff would hand a colored card to the player. This colored card will correspond with a time slot for a game. Several different colors may be used. Games often ran on a 20-min time schedule. (8:00, 8:20, 8:40, 9, etc)

Shortly after visiting "Phase 1", there will be an announcement for players with a certain color to visit "Phase 2". This is located in another position at the front counter. When called up, a player will turn in their colored card(provided it’s the right game), pick a code name to use during their game, and be handed an "activator". This is a smaller plastic arrow, or wand, with a RFID tag on the end of it. This is used at the beginning of your game to "key in" to a pack of your choosing to use for the game. Codenames can be up to 10 characters in length and can be anything that isn't already taken during that game(no duplicates). There is often a list of suggestions at the counter. Players may not use any offensive names or words.

Shortly after "Phase 2", players with that color will be asked to move to "Phase 3". This is the briefing room, where players will be taught how to use the equipment by the staff. The players will also recite the players code, which is the rules for the game;

I will not run, climb or jump

I will not sit, kneel or lie down

I will not cover any targets

I will not use offensive language

I will not make physical contact with any other player

I will play hard, play smart and give it my all! (This was originally "play to survive")

After the briefing, players will enter the "airlock", where the packs/vests are placed. Players will select a lighted vest, place the equipment on and key into their pack with the activator they received. On the back of their laser, should display their code name. Players will then line up, at the direction of the staff, and their activators will be collected as they are then directed into the maze/arena. (Sometimes, the player code is recited in the airlock instead of the briefing room)

Inside the arena, players navigate multi-level pathways featuring black lights, glowing paint, fog machines, mirrors, and strobe lights. The objective is to tag opposing players while avoiding being tagged in the process.

At the conclusion of the game, the players pack will emit an “end of game” noise and will shut off. The staff will make an announcement for them to return to the airlock and place their pack back upon the rack in which they took it from. Players will then proceed out of the airlock, via an exit door, and meet the staff at the score monitor in lobby for their scorecards (Phase 4).

== Equipment ==
Every LQ centre is equipped with approximately 30 packs, also called vests or ponchos. This number varies with busier arenas having more packs to accommodate larger crowds. The pack is made of a thick canvas-type material that hangs over the shoulders. When laid out flat on a table the vest forms a diamond shape. Sensors placed on various parts of the vest covering the chest, the back, and each shoulder. "There are additional sensors housed within the hand-held 'laser' unit located at the front, and both sides of the laser." The sensor on the chest’s housing is also home to a small motor, that vibrates when the player has been hit.

The infrared sensors are attached to printed circuit boards, which include several colours of LEDs, often red and green or red and blue, that light up when the pack is active. Each PCB is housed in a hard plastic cover. Part of each cover is made from clear plastic to allow the IR beams to reach the sensors.

Inside the laser shell is the PCB with sensors and lights, a speaker to indicate the status of the pack, a trigger, and an LCD to display the status of the pack to the player. The IR unit is what emits the visible laser the eye sees and the invisible IR beam which "tags" the opponent's packs.

The laser has a display in the rear. When a player is tagged, it displays the codename of the tagger and the location of the tag. It also occasionally displays the player's current ranking as the game progresses.

== Scoring ==
Laser Quest players gain points by tagging other players in one of their vest targets. Occasionally, there may be a base or arena target as well(extremely rare). A successful tag on an opponent will gain that player 10pts. They lose points when they are tagged by other players. The number of points lost depends on where the player hit and game settings.

- Shoulders: -3 points
- Laser: -3 points
- Back: -4 points
- Front: -5 points

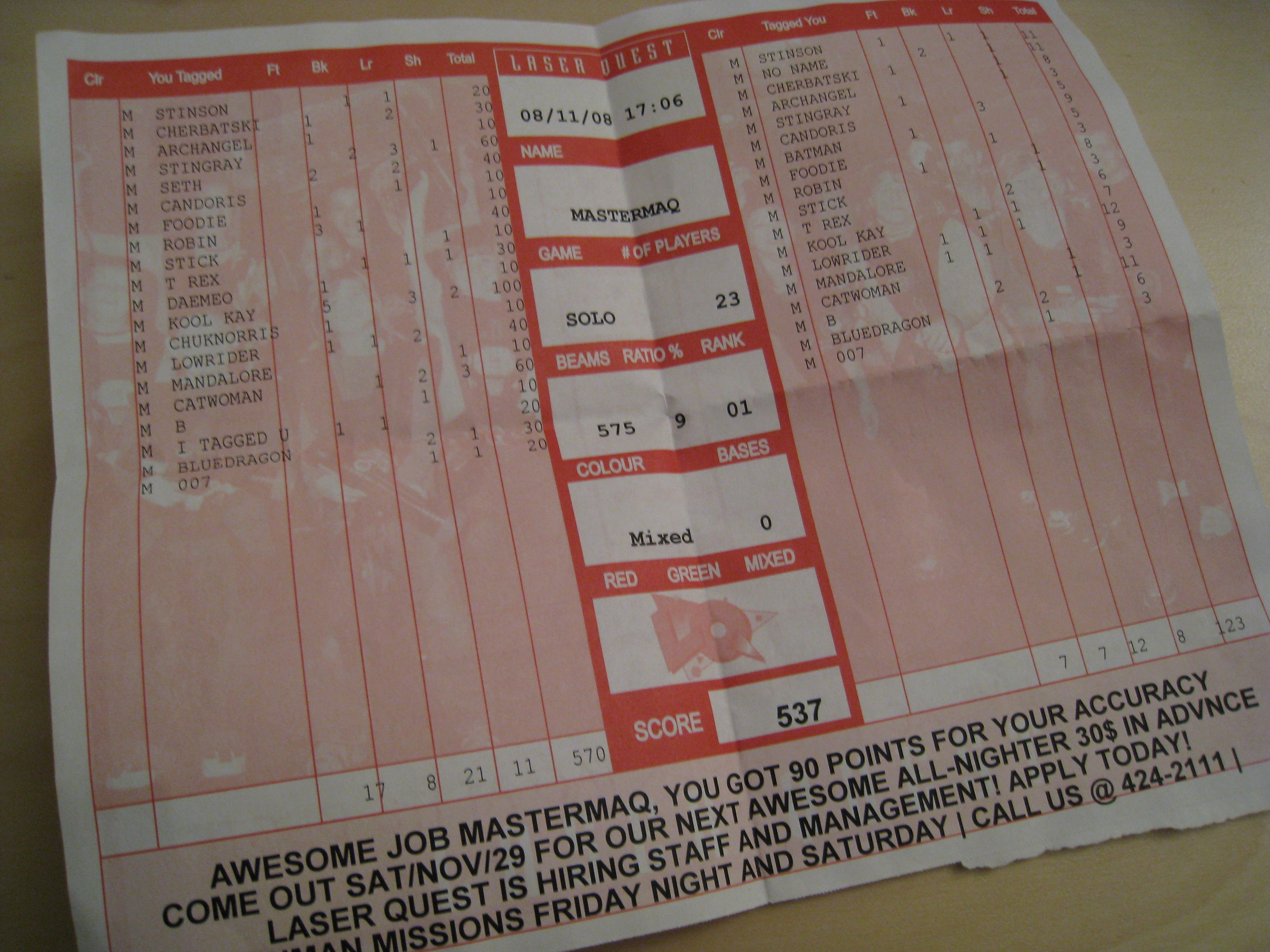
Laser Quest score card from a team game.

Players may also be awarded bonus points based on their accuracy—usually 10 points for every 1% hit rate. Players achieving a hit rate of 10% are awarded 100 bonus points. In a standard "Solo" game, this bonus is limited to a maximum of 100 points, far less than the theoretical maximum of 1000 points awarded to a 100% accuracy. This prevents players tagging one person with their first tag and then hiding for the rest of the game. As it is possible to tag multiple players with one tag, it is possible for a player's accuracy ratio to exceed 100%.

In team games, the team score is the sum of all similarly coloured players' individual scores.

== Game variants ==
The hardware and software used limit what types of games a Laser Quest center can hold. Up to four different groups of settings can be created; it is normal for everyone on a team to have the same settings, though this is not required. When giving packs within a team different settings, the packs will not be visibly different in-game, with the exception of 'sentinel' packs that have the ability to give lives and ammunition to teammates. These packs are identified by an alternate light pattern on the front and back sensor.

The settings which can be altered are:

Available settings	options	standard game settings
Game type	All-on-all, 2-team, 3-team, 4-team	All-on-all
Game time (minutes)	1 to 99	15
Number of lives	1 to 99 or unlimited	unlimited
Number of shots	1 to 9999 or unlimited	unlimited
Downtime (seconds)	1 to 99	2–5
Shoulder sensors	on/off	on
Laser sensors	on/off	on
Base	on/off	off
Replenishers	on/off	off
Replenisher values for lives and shots		off
Sentinel effect	on/off	off
Sentinel values for lives and shots		off

The number of shots used can be quite large; in certain game types, players routinely fire 3000+ shots. This will give an accuracy rate of perhaps 5%. This seemingly low amount is a result of constant firing and dodging, as players are not directly penalised for missed shots. The average is 6% ratio of accuracy.

Downtime is defined as the period of time after a player is tagged that they remain deactivated. After the downtime has expired, the de-activated player's pack will re-energise and they are able to play as before.

== Cheating ==
Although all players are required to recite a code of conduct before play, some may still cheat. The primary way of cheating has been the intentional blocking of one’s targets. Players have caught for bringing foreign material or objects in to block their sensors; tape, vasoline or large clothing that would obstruct a target from being tagged. Those items have always been prohibited, and players using such items would be subject to ejection from the game.

Another way is what players call 'Spocking', when players makes a 'V' shape with their hands and blocks the sensor on the end of the laser. Often times players will “cup” their laser. This is where their 2nd hand would be placed across the bottom of the end of the laser, blocking the sensors at the end. This makes getting tagged in the end of the laser very difficult. Players would be called for “cupping” if they are seen blocking the sensors at the end of their laser.

Typically, the end of the laser would have a large rubber ring(either orange or blue). Tournaments would require players hands to be behind this ring.

Blocking of sensors is the primary way to cheat during a game of LQ. Outside of “cupping” or “spocking”, players intending to block their targets would bend, or lean, away from their opponents. While moving and dodging, a player may occasionally block their equipment, that would be permitted as long as the obstruction was momentarily and in the process of a natural movement. All calls of obstruction are subject to the arena marshals/referees.

== World Laser Quest Challenge/Championship (WLC) ==
This tournament occurs every couple of years where teams and players from the US, Canada, the Netherlands, France, and the UK compete to be the best in the world. The WLC alternates between participating countries.

WLC Champions

Year	Location	Champion
2002	Las Vegas (USA)	Team USA (USA)
2004	Swindon (UK)	The Tribe Called Quest (UK)
2007	Mississauga (Canada)	Team Canada (Canada)
2010	Coignieres/Maurepas, Yvelines (France)	Team USA (USA)
2012	Mississauga (Canada)	Team USA (USA)
2016	Las Vegas (USA)	NPBIAC (USA/Canada/France)
2017	Woking (UK)	Team North America (USA/Canada)
2019	San Jose, California (USA)	NAC (USA/Canada)
2025	Swindon (UK)	LQ Legends, Eindhoven (NL)

This tournament is often held irregularly dependant on player interest. The current format of the tournament is 6-man teams compete in quad or triple quest prelim games, then depending on their prelim rank they will either play the cup or plate knockouts which are pack-set double/triple quest games. The top teams in the cup and the plate will then go onto the finals which are pack-set double-quest games.

== North America Challenge (NAC) ==
Laser Quest used to hold a corporate tournament called the North America Challenge, or NAC. Each center would field a team of 9 players(plus 1 alternate). Occasionally, centers would have enough players to field an A and B team.

Players would attend their respective centers tryouts, usually held in the spring of each year(March/April). The tryout format would be a series of 18 free-for-all games. At the conclusion of the tryout games, each players top 3 and lowest 3 scores would be excluded from their totals. Players would then be ranked, and the top 9 players(plus 1 alternate) would become the centers team for the Regional/NAC tournament. Remaining players, if sufficient in numbers, would make up a 2nd team.

From 1995-1997, teams were sent directly to the NAC, held in various locations in Canada and The US. As Laser Quest expanded their centers across North America, the NAC would need to change as well.

Beginning in 1998, in order to establish a manageable amount of teams for the NAC, Regional tournaments were introduced. North America would be divided into 4 regions: North, South, East and West. Alignment of the regions would occasionally flex, depending on the number of centers and/or strengths of the player bases. Each region would have a host center to hold their respective tournament. The regional tournament was typically held on the last weekend of June, and all 4 regional tournaments would run on the same weekend. The top 5 teams from each regional would advance to the NAC in September.

Starting in 2008, with a reduction in centers across North America, regionals was reduced from 4 regions to 3.

Game Play

The NAC and Regional game play evolved over the years. From 1995 to 1998, tournament games followed similar formats to a standard game; 15-min in length, 5 second downtime. This format would also feature 3-teams competing at once, utilizing one of 3 colors during a game: Red, Green or Mixed(combo of the other colors). Players could not tag their own teammates.

This required a lot of time in order to complete a tournament, especially with a large number of teams. Teams would play 3 games, over their preliminary round. Pack/color rotation was not factored into scheduling. The top teams would move into playoff round, where they played a single game with a random pack assignment. This would determine who moved onto finals.

Finals would be a single 30-min “Ironman” game. Winner take all.

Beginning in 1999, in collaboration with a number of players and management, it was decided to change the game play format up. Players would now play 6 games, 8-min in length. The 5 second downtime would remain, but a fair and equal pack/color rotation was implemented, allowing each team to play on each color twice. There would also be a seeding, based on their regional rankings; you wouldn’t play anyone that was the same seed as you, and no one from your region during prelims. Teams would then be ranked and the top 9 would make playoffs.

Standard scoring applied for tags;

10pts for tagging an opponent

-5pts if you are tagged in the front

-4pts if you are tagged in the back

-3pts if you are tagged in the shoulder or laser

Scoring

Team scores were calculated by combing all the players scores together. A first place team would receive 3 points for a win, 2nd place would receive 2pts and 3rd place would receive 1pt, but only if they were within 250pts of 2nd place. These rank points would be used to rank teams at the end of prelims. A team could earn as many as 18pts over their prelims, provided they won all their games. Total scores would be used as tie breakers in the final standings.

Playoffs

For a majority of the NAC, teams making the playoffs were seeded 1-9, based on their preliminary games. Seeding would look like this:

1 vs 6 vs 7

2 vs 5 vs 8

3 vs 4 vs 9

Teams would play a Triple Quest within their respective playoff matchup. A Triple Quest would be 3 games, 3 teams, rotating colors each game. The team with the highest total score at the end of the Triple Quest would move onto the finals(rank points were not a factor in playoffs). The 2nd place team would move onto a consolation round, the 3rd place team would be eliminated.

Typically your highest seed would start game 1 on Red, 2nd highest seed(within that playoff matchup) would start on green and the lowest seed would start on mixed. For the 2nd game, the highest seed would move to green, 2nd highest seed would move to mixed and the lowest seed would move to red. The final game of that playoff matchup would have your highest seed on mixed, 2nd highest seed on red and the lowest seed on red.

The Finals and Consolation round followed this same format. With the exception that the finals would be 3 games that were 10min in length. This format would prove to be wildly popular for nearly a decade.

=== NAC Champions and Runners Up ===
Year	Winner	First Runner Up	Third Place	Consolation Winner/4th	Finals Location
2012 Details	TSA; Toronto; ON	NRH; North Richland Hills; TX	Mesa; Mesa; AZ	Denver; Denver; CO	Las Vegas; NV
2011; Details	NRH; North Richland Hills; TX	TSA; Toronto; ON	Mesa; Mesa; AZ	Federal Way; Seattle; WA	Las Vegas; NV
2010; Details	TSA; Toronto; ON	NRH; North Richland Hills; TX	Mesa; Mesa; AZ	Federal Way; Seattle; WA	Hoffman Estates; IL
2009; Details	NRH; North Richland Hills; TX	TSA; Toronto; ON	Federal Way; Seattle; WA	Team OFF; Hoffman Estates; IL	Las Vegas; NV
2008; Details	NRH; North Richland Hills; TX	ShadowZ; Lincoln; NE	TSA; Scarborough; ON	Team OFF; Hoffman Estates; IL	Hoffman Estates; IL
2007; Details	9 Deadly Venoms; Houston; TX	Brampton Brew Crew; Brampton; ON	Team OFF; Hoffman Estates; IL	NRH; North Richland Hills; TX	Gwinnett; GA
2006; Details	ShadowZ; Lincoln; NE	Westland Wolfpack; Westland; MI	42; Appleton; WI	Brampton Brew Crew; Brampton; ON	Las Vegas; NV
2005; Details	NRH; North Richland Hills; TX	9 Deadly Venoms; Houston; TX	Westland Wolfpack; Westland; MI	Brampton Brew Crew; Brampton; ON	Mesquite; TX
2004; Details	Brampton Brew Crew; Brampton; ON	NRH; North Richland Hills; TX	9 Deadly Venoms; Houston; TX	Phoenix Pyros; Phoenix; AZ	Rochester; NY
2003; Details	Paragon; Denver; CO	Westland Wolfpack; Westland; MI	ShadowZ; Lincoln; NE	Brampton Brew Crew; Brampton; ON	North Richland Hills; TX
2002; Details	Paragon; Denver; CO	Phoenix Pyros; Phoenix; AZ	9 Deadly Venoms; Houston; TX	ShadowZ; Lincoln; NE	Norridge; IL
2001; Details	Paragon; Denver; CO	Westland Wolfpack; Westland; MI	San Antonio; San Antonio; TX	Austin; Austin; TX	Colorado Springs; CO
2000; Details	Phoenix Pyros; Phoenix; AZ	Paragon; Denver; CO	Tulsa Whoopdonkeys; Tulsa; OK	Westland Wolfpack; Westland; MI	Scarborough; ON
1999; Details	Phoenix Pyros; Phoenix; AZ	Paragon; Denver; CO	Austin; Austin; TX	NRH; North Richland Hills; TX	North Richland Hills; TX
1998; Details	9 Deadly Venoms; Houston; TX	Phoenix Pyros; Phoenix; AZ	Armageddon; Lincoln; NE	Mesa; Mesa; AZ	Knoxville; TN
1997; Details	Team MAD; Madison Heights; MI	Paragon; Denver; CO	Oshawa; Oshawa; ON	Phoenix Pyros; Phoenix; AZ	Downers Grove; IL
1996; Details	Oshawa; Oshawa; ON	London; London; ON	Brampton Brew Crew; Brampton; ON	Charlotte; Charlotte; NC	London; ON
1995; Details	Oshawa; Oshawa; ON	Brampton Generals; Brampton; ON	Brampton Wildfire; Brampton; ON		London; ON

== European Laser Quest Championship (ELC) ==
This 9-man constructed team tournament consists of players from UK, France and the Netherlands. The tournament is held annually, with the location alternating among participating countries. The current format of the tournament is 6-man teams compete in triple-quest prelim games, then depending on their prelim rank they will either play the cup or plate knockouts which are pack-set double/triple quest games. The top teams in the cup and the plate will then go onto the finals which are pack-set double-quest games.

ELC Results

Year	Location	1st place	2nd place	3rd place	4th place	Consolation Winner
2001	'Guildford / Woking (UK)'	'The Tribe Called Quest' Guildford, UK	'Wildcards' Eindhoven, NL	'Orange Bulls' Doetinchem, NL	'Westside Posse' Bristol, UK	'Freestylaz' Guildford, UK
2003	'Swindon (UK)'	'The Tribe Called Quest' Guildford, UK	'Badgers' Guildford, UK	'NWO' Woking, UK	'Ruff Riders' Eindhoven, NL	'Holland Antje' Doetinchem, NL
2004	'Groningen (NL)'	'LQ Legends' Eindhoven, NL	'The Tribe Called Quest' Guildford, UK	'Big Uns' Eindhoven, NL	'Team Win' Swindon, UK	'DTC' Cannes, FR
2005	'Reims (FR)'	'The Tribe Called Quest' Guildford, UK	'RAW' Swindon, UK	'Team Win' Swindon, UK	'Sorry Team' Toulouse, FR	'Phoenix Cende' Coignieres, FR
2006	'Eindhoven (NL)'	'LQ Legends' Eindhoven, NL	'Team Win' Swindon, UK	'The Tribe Called Quest' Guildford, UK	'Team Win' Coignieres, FR	'Badgers' Guildford, UK
2007	'Bristol (UK)'	'Sorry Team' Toulouse, FR	'The Tribe Called Quest' Guildford, UK	'Team Win' Coignieres, FR	'Team Win' Swindon, UK	'LQ Legends' Eindhoven, NL
2008	'Bourges (FR)'	'Sorry Team' Toulouse, FR	'The Tribe Called Quest' Guildford, UK	'Team Win' Coignieres, FR	'LQ Legends' Eindhoven, NL	'Badgers' Guildford UK
2009	'Bournemouth (UK)'	'The Tribe Called Quest' Guildford, UK	'UK Rage' Swindon, UK	'Badgers' Guildford, UK	'NWO' Woking, UK	
2010	'Bournemouth (UK)'	'The Tribe Called Quest Allstars' Guildford/Coignieres/Toronto UK/FR/CAN	'France' Coignieres/Cannes FR	'Wolf Pack' Swindon, UK	'Badgers' Guildford, UK	'Bournemouth A' UK
2012	'Beauvais (FR)'	'Phoenix' Coignieres, FR	'Roxxage' Cannes, FR	'New Team' Coignieres, FR	'The Tribe Called Quest' Guildford, UK	'Fromage' Eindhoven, NL
2013	'Coventry (UK)'	'Mixteam' Cannes/Bordeaux/Coignieres, FR	'Phoenix' Coignieres, FR	'The Tribe Called Quest' Guildford/Federal Way, UK/USA	'Norfolk'n'Good' Coventry, UK	'The Good Looking TCQ' Guildford, UK
2014	'Eindhoven (NL)'	'Sorry Team' Toulouse, FR	'Phoenix' Coignieres, FR	'Roxxage' Cannes, FR	'UK Allstars' Guildford/Swindon, UK	'LQ Legends' Eindhoven, NL
2015	'Boulogne-Sur-Mer (FR)'	'Phoenix' Coignieres, FR	'Roxxage' Antibes, FR	'The Tribe Called Quest' Guildford, UK	'United We Stand' Antibes, FR	'LQ Legends' Eindhoven, NL
2019	'Woking (UK)'	'Phoenix' Coignieres, FR	'The Tribe Called Quest' Guildford, UK	'Roxxage' Antibes, FR	'BOTR' Coignieres, FR	'LQ Legends' Eindhoven, NL
2022						

Currently, 14 European Championships have taken place. France currently holds 7 European titles. The UK holds 5 European titles. The Netherlands holds 2 European titles. France are the current European Champions. However, The Tribe Called Quest hold the most titles.

At the moment, the tournament is held irregularly due to player interest.
