= Anne Grignon =

French politician (born 1977)

Member of the French National Assembly for Yvelines's 2nd constituency
- In office 5 August 2022 – 12 August 2022
- Preceded by: Jean-Noël Barrot
- Succeeded by: Jean-Noël Barrot

Mayor of Lévis-Saint-Nom
- Incumbent
- Assumed office 9 March 2008
- Preceded by: Yves Vandewalle

Personal details
- Born: 16 May 1977 (age 49)
- Party: Democratic Movement
- Parent: Yves Vandewalle (father)

Anne Grignon (born 16 May 1977) is a French politician serving as mayor of Lévis-Saint-Nom since 2008. In August 2022, she was a member of the National Assembly. She is the daughter of Yves Vandewalle.
