= Jean-Noël Barrot =

French politician (born 1983)

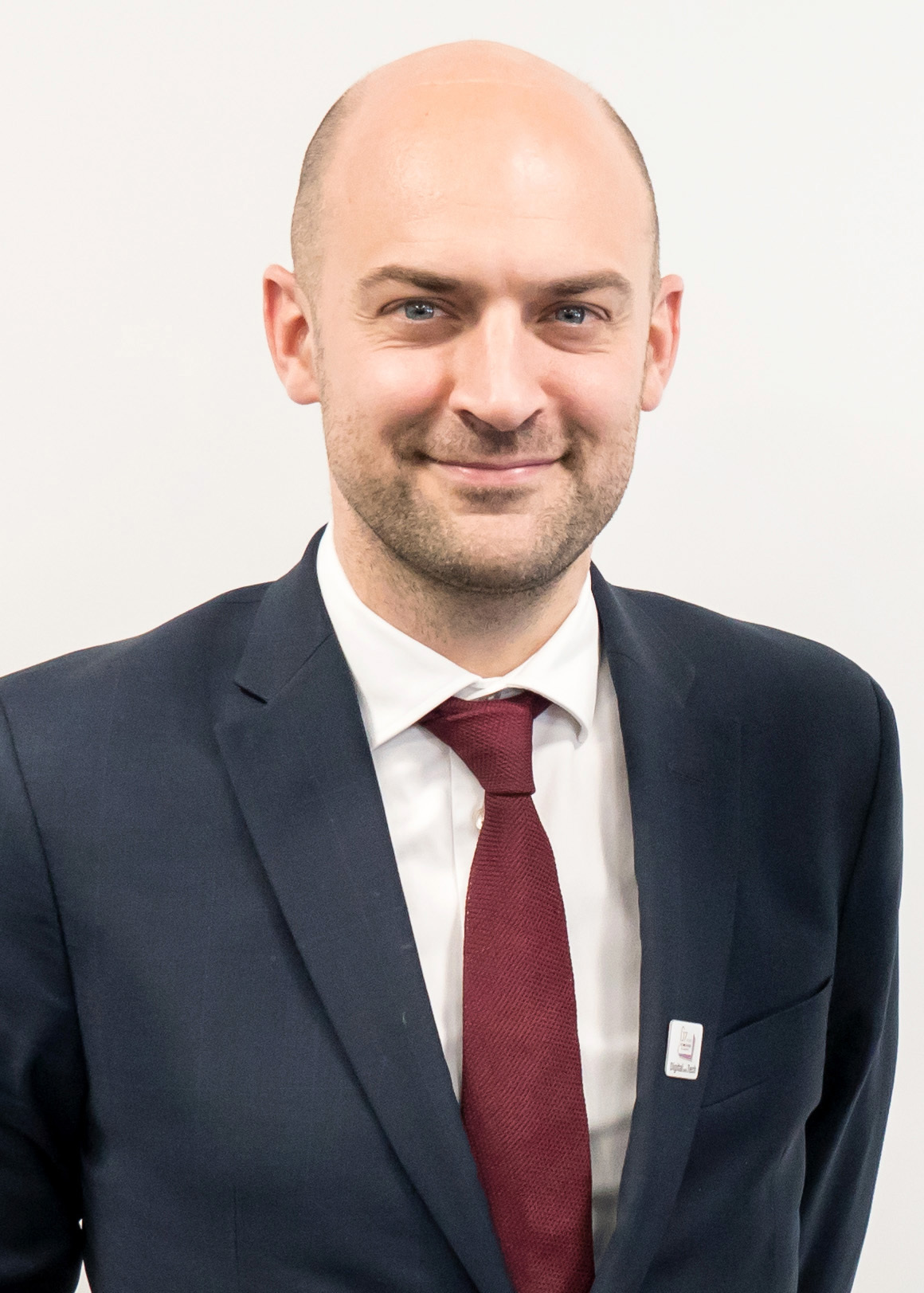
- Barrot in 2023

Minister for Europe and Foreign Affairs
- Incumbent
- Assumed office 21 September 2024
- Prime Minister: Michel Barnier; François Bayrou; Sébastien Lecornu
- Preceded by: Stéphane Séjourné

President of the Foreign Affairs Committee of the National Assembly
- In office 20 July 2024 – 21 September 2024
- Preceded by: Jean-Louis Bourlanges
- Succeeded by: Bruno Fuchs

Minister Delegate for European Affairs
- In office 8 February 2024 – 21 September 2024
- Prime Minister: Gabriel Attal
- Preceded by: Laurence Boone
- Succeeded by: Benjamin Haddad

Minister Delegate for Digital Transition and Telecommunications
- In office 4 July 2022 – 11 January 2024
- Prime Minister: Élisabeth Borne
- Preceded by: Cédric O
- Succeeded by: Marina Ferrari

Member of the National Assembly for Yvelines's 2nd constituency
- In office 8 July 2024 – 21 October 2024
- Preceded by: Anne Bergantz
- Succeeded by: Anne Bergantz
- In office 10 October 2022 – 9 November 2022
- Preceded by: Anne Grignon
- Succeeded by: Anne Bergantz
- In office 21 June 2017 – 19 June 2022
- Preceded by: Pascal Thévenot
- Succeeded by: Anne Grignon

Member of the Regional Council of Île-de-France
- Incumbent
- Assumed office 2 July 2021

General Secretary of the Democratic Movement
- In office 12 December 2018 – 23 July 2022
- Preceded by: Yann Wehrling
- Succeeded by: Maud Gatel

Spokesperson of the Democratic Movement
- In office 28 February 2018 – 12 December 2018
- Preceded by: Yann Wehrling
- Succeeded by: Sarah El Haïry

Member of the Departmental Council of Haute-Loire for the canton of Yssingeaux
- In office 2 April 2015 – 27 June 2017 Serving with Madeleine Dubois
- Preceded by: Madeleine Dubois
- Succeeded by: Georges Philibert

Personal details
- Born: 13 May 1983 (age 43) Paris, France
- Party: Democratic Movement
- Parent: Jacques Barrot (father)
- Education: Lycée Henri-IV; HEC Paris; Sciences Po; Paris School of Economics
- Occupation: Economist; politician

Jean-Noël Barrot (French pronunciation: [ʒɑ̃nɔɛl baʁo]; born 13 May 1983) is a French-Swiss politician of the Democratic Movement (MoDem) who has served as Minister for Europe and Foreign Affairs in the successive governments of Prime Ministers Michel Barnier, François Bayrou and Sébastien Lecornu since 21 September 2024. He previously served as Minister Delegate for Digital Transition and Telecommunications in the government of Élisabeth Borne from 2022 to 2024 and Minister Delegate for European Affairs in the government of Gabriel Attal in 2024.

An academic by occupation, Barrot was elected to represent the 2nd constituency of the Yvelines department in the National Assembly in 2017 with the support of La République En Marche! (LREM), prior to joining the government. In 2024, he was elected president of the National Assembly Committee on Foreign Affairs, a position he held until his appointment as Foreign Minister.

== Early life and career ==
Barrot was born in 1983 in the 14th arrondissement of Paris. He is the grandson of Noël Barrot, a Christian Democratic Resistance fighter and later a deputy for Haute-Loire.

His mother, Florence Cattani, is Swiss and originally from Lausanne. His father, Jacques Barrot, was a prominent figure in the French Fifth Republic: a Christian Democratic deputy for Haute-Loire for around 30 years, he served as a minister in several governments, became vice-president of the European Commission from 2004 to 2009, and served as a member of the French Constitutional Council from 2010 to 2014. His younger sister, Hélène Barrot, was, in 2022, Uber's communications director for Western and Southern European markets.

Barrot followed a classe préparatoire at the Lycée Henri-IV, and graduated from HEC Paris in 2007 (grande école master's programme) and 2013 (PhD). He also graduated with master's degrees from Sciences Po and the Paris School of Economics, both in 2008.

In 2013, Barrot became a research affiliate at the Sloan School of Management at the MIT. In 2017, he became an assistant professor at HEC Paris.

== Political career ==
=== Career in local politics ===
Barrot served in the Departmental Council of Haute-Loire for the canton of Yssingeaux from 2015 until his resignation in 2017, a position his father had held until 2004.

In the 2021 regional election, he was elected to the Regional Council of Île-de-France on the La République En Marche! list led by Laurent Saint-Martin.

=== Member of Parliament (2017–2022) ===
In the 2017 legislative election, Barrot was elected to the National Assembly in the 2nd constituency of Yvelines, which encompasses HEC Paris, the grande école he taught at. He defeated outgoing deputy Pascal Thévenot of The Republicans with 58.3% of the second-round vote.

In Parliament, he served as a vice president of the Committee on Finance. He co-authored with Bénédicte Peyrol draft legislation in 2018 to combat large-scale tax evasion and avoidance schemes through dividend stripping in the wake of the CumEx Files revelations.

In addition to his committee assignments, Barrot was a member of the French-Uruguayan parliamentary friendship group.

In late 2017, Barrot was appointed by President of the National Assembly François de Rugy to chair a ten-member working group on reforming the National Assembly. The group submitted two reports, in 2017 and 2018, respectively.

From February 2018, Barrot served as a Democratic Movement spokesperson, in tandem with Sarah El Haïry. He eventually succeeded Yann Wehrling as Secretary General of the Democratic Movement in December 2018, serving until July 2022 under the leadership of party president François Bayrou.

=== Minister for Digital Transition and Telecommunications (2022–2024) ===
In July 2022, Barrot was appointed Minister Delegate for Digital Transition and Telecommunications in the government of Prime Minister Élisabeth Borne.

He won a by-election in October 2022, triggered by the resignation of his substitute Anne Grignon—who had been representing him in the National Assembly after he joined the government—due to a legal incompatibility related to her eligibility.

In 2023, he criticized ChatGPT and accused the service of not respecting privacy law. However, he also stated being opposed to efforts to ban the service.

=== Minister Delegate for European Affairs (2024) ===
In February 2024, Barrot was appointed Minister Delegate for European Affairs under Foreign Minister Stéphane Séjourné in the government of Prime Minister Gabriel Attal.

After being reelected in the 2024 snap legislative election, he was elected chair of the Foreign Affairs Committee while serving as the caretaker Minister Delegate for European Affairs.

=== Minister for Europe and Foreign Affairs (2024–present) ===
Barrot was appointed Minister for Europe and Foreign Affairs in the government of Prime Minister Michel Barnier on 21 September 2024, succeeding Séjourné, who had been proposed as France's new European Commissioner in Brussels by President Emmanuel Macron, within the Von der Leyen Commission II. He was retained by François Bayrou when he succeeded Barnier as prime minister. He was also retained by Bayrou's successor, Sébastien Lecornu upon the formation of his first government and later also in his second government in October 2025.

On 29 September, Barrot traveled to Lebanon, two days prior to the start of the Israeli invasion of the country, stating France "stands with Lebanon", as the country was being pulled into a war "it did not choose". On 8 October, he called Israeli Prime Minister Benjamin Netanyahu's rhetoric on the matter a "provocation".

In January 2025, Barrot and his German counterpart Annalena Baerbock visited Damascus to meet Syria's de facto new leader Ahmed al-Sharaa on behalf of the European Union, thereby becoming the first ministers from the EU to visit the country since the fall of the Assad regime.

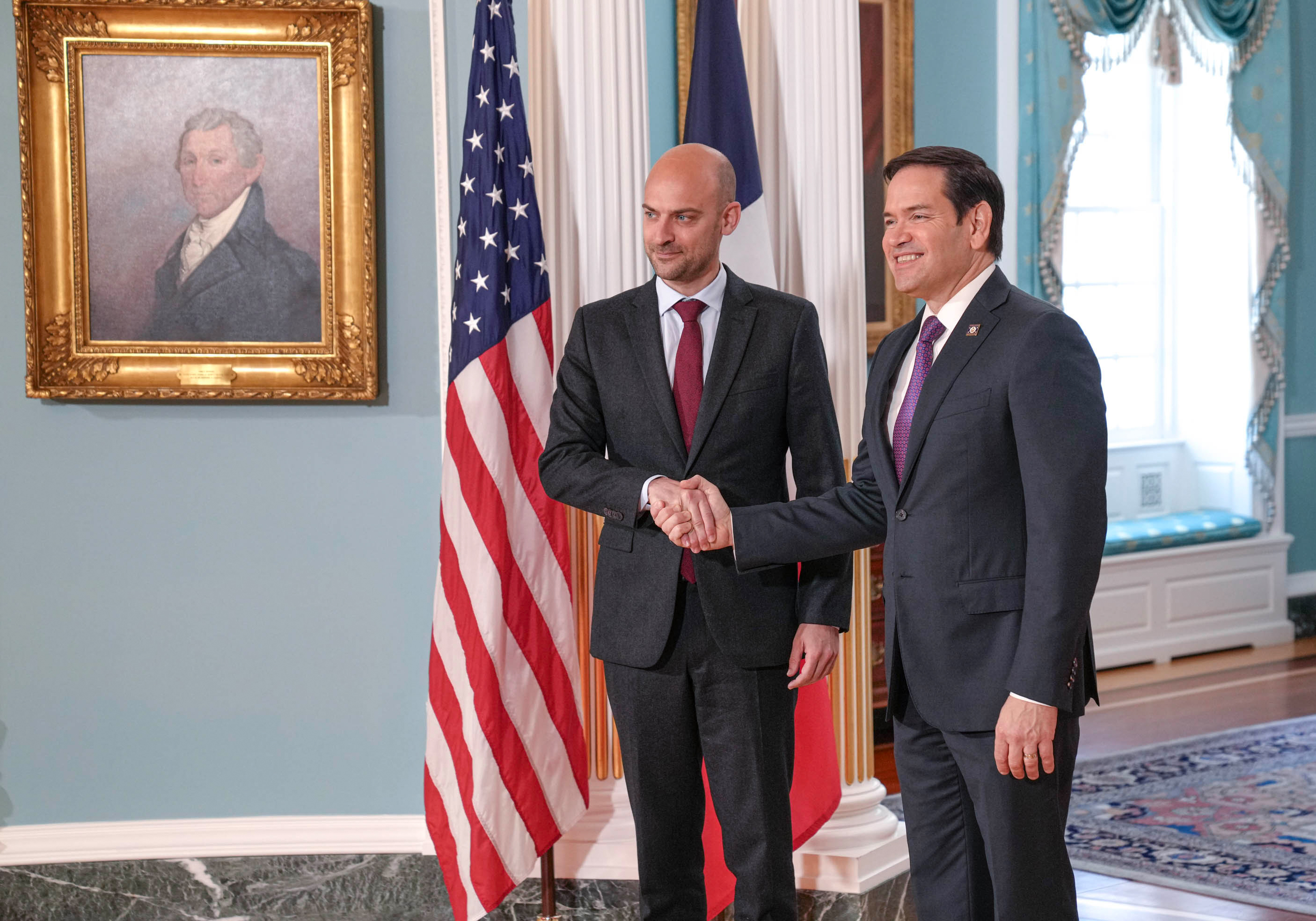
Barrot with U.S. Secretary of State Marco Rubio in Washington, D.C., 1 May 2025

In February 2025 Barrot urged G20 states to show unambivalent support for the international rules-based order, including the sovereignty of Ukraine. Barrot said the real line of geopolitical division was not between north and south but between those who supported the international rules-based order and those who did not.

On 3 January 2026, Barrot condemned the United States strikes in Venezuela as illegal, stating: "The military operation that led to the capture of Nicolás Maduro violates the principle of not resorting to force, that underpins international law. France reiterates that no lasting political solution can be imposed from the outside and that only sovereign people themselves can decide their future."

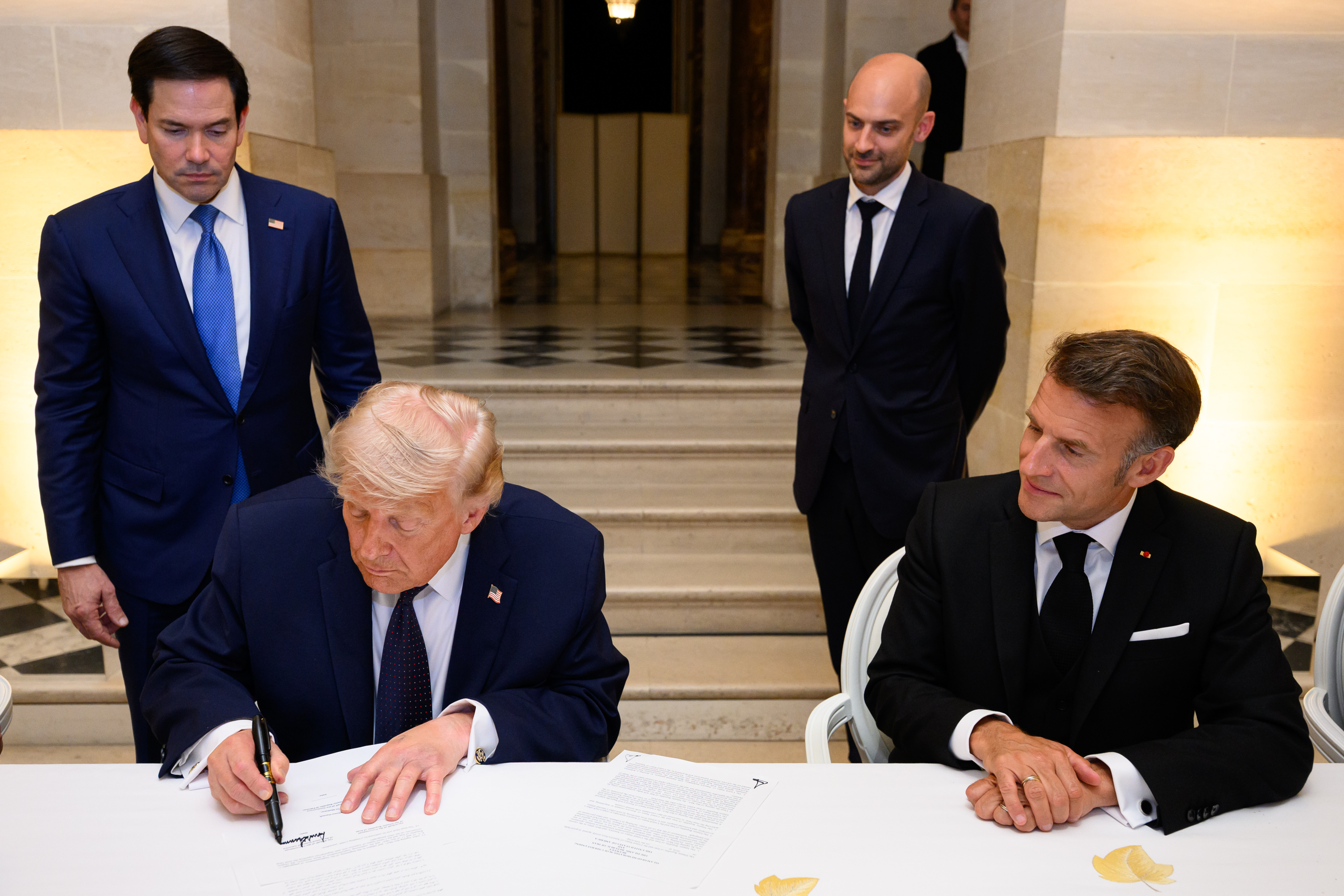
Barrot in June 2026, standing behind Emmanuel Macron as US president Donald Trump signs the Islamabad Memorandum of Understanding at the Palace of Versailles, with US Secretary of State Marco Rubio standing behind Trump.

In April 2025, Barrot wrote to the UN Commissioner for Human Rights to oppose the automatic renewal of Francesca Albanese in her role as UN Special Rapporteur. On 11 February 2026, Barrot called for her resignation.

In June 2026, Barrot was present with French President Emmanuel Macron at the Palace of Versailles when US President Donald Trump signed the Islamabad Memorandum, a memorandum of understanding between the United States and Iran aimed at ending the 2026 Iran war.

== Political positions ==
In June 2020, Barrot together with fellow party member Patrick Mignola proposed a law to introduce mail-in voting to facilitate voting during the public health crisis caused by the COVID-19 pandemic in France.

== Private life ==
Barrot is married to Marina Barrot and the couple have two children together.
