= Saint-Rémy-l'Honoré =

Saint-Rémy-l’Honoré
- Commune
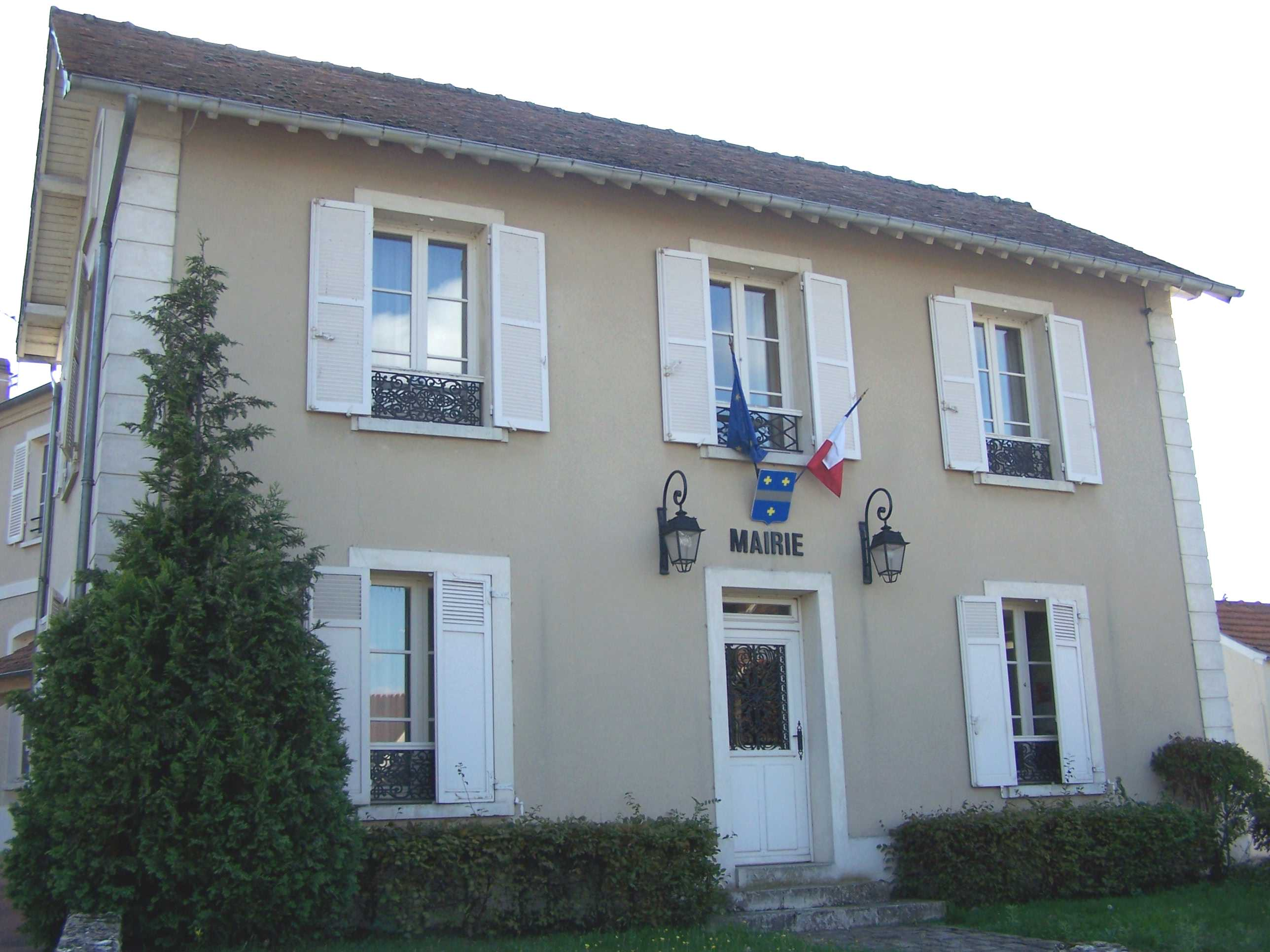
- Town hall
- Location of Saint-Rémy-l’Honoré
- Location within France Location within Île-de-France (region)
- Coordinates: 48°45′25″N 1°52′54″E
- Country: France
- Region: Île-de-France
- Department: Yvelines
- Arrondissement: Rambouillet
- Canton: Aubergenville

Government
  - Mayor (2026–32): Patrick Ratel
- Area^{1}: 10.15 km^{2} (3.92 sq mi)
- Elevation: 172 m (564 ft)
- Highest elevation: 180 m (590 ft)
- Lowest elevation: 94 m (308 ft)
- Population (2023): 1,689
  - Density: 166.4/km^{2} (431.0/sq mi)
- Time zone: UTC+01:00 (CET)
  - Summer (DST): UTC+02:00 (CEST)
- INSEE/Postal code: 78576 /78690
- ^{1} French Land Register data, which excludes lakes, ponds, glaciers > 1 km^{2} (0.386 sq mi or 247 acres) and river estuaries.

Saint-Rémy-l'Honoré (French pronunciation: [sɛ̃ ʁemi lɔnɔʁe]) is a commune in the Yvelines department in the Île-de-France region in north-central France.

== Geography ==
Saint-Rémy-l'Honoré is situated approximately 35 kilometres (22 mi) southwest of the centre of Paris and 15 kilometres (9.3 mi) north of Rambouillet. It is bordered by the communes of Jouars-Pontchartrain, Coignières, Les Bréviaires, and Le Perray-en-Yvelines.

The commune is an integral part of the Parc naturel régional de la Haute Vallée de Chevreuse (Haute Vallée de Chevreuse Regional Natural Park), a protected area celebrated for its preserved rural landscapes, extensive woodlands, and rich biodiversity. The local landscape is characterized by rolling hills, small agricultural plateaus, and forested valleys.

== History ==
=== Origins and Middle Ages ===
The territory of Saint-Rémy-l'Honoré has ancient historical roots, with its name originating from Saint Remigius (Saint Remi), the Archbishop of Reims who baptized Clovis I in the late 5th century.

The medieval history of the commune is deeply intertwined with the powerful House of Montfort-l'Amaury. In 1112, Amaury III de Montfort and his sister, Bertrade de Montfort (the former Queen of France and widow of King Philip I), founded the Royal Priory of Hautes-Bruyères (Prieuré des Hautes-Bruyères) within the commune's limits. Affiliated with the Order of Fontevraud, this monastery became a highly influential religious institution, a major landowner in the region, and the chosen burial site for several prominent members of the Montfort dynasty.

=== The Royal Relic and the Revolution ===
The priory achieved national historical significance in the mid-16th century. Following the death of King Francis I at the nearby Château de Rambouillet in 1547, his heart and internal organs were embalmed and deposited at the Hautes-Bruyères priory, according to royal funerary traditions. The relics were housed in a magnificent Renaissance funerary monument sculpted by Pierre Bontemps.

During the French Revolution, the priory was declared national property (bien national), closed by decree in 1790, and subsequently dismantled to be used as building materials. The monument containing Francis I's heart was fortunately salvaged from destruction and later transferred to the Basilica of Saint-Denis, where it stands today. Currently, only minor archaeological vestiges and local road names recall the existence of this vast monastic complex.

=== Modern Era ===
Following the destruction of the priory, Saint-Rémy-l'Honoré reverted to a quiet, predominantly agricultural community specializing in cereal farming and forestry. Throughout the 20th century, the village successfully preserved its rural heritage and environmental settings while gradually transitioning into a peaceful residential area for professionals working within the Versailles and Paris metropolitan regions.

== Culture and Heritage ==
=== Local Landmarks ===
- Church of Saint-Rémy: A historic local church featuring architectural elements spanning several centuries, serving as the focal point of the historic village center.
- Vestiges of the Hautes-Bruyères Priory: Historical markers and remnants of the medieval royal monastery.

=== Cinema and Television ===
Due to its picturesque landscapes, preserved rural architecture, and close proximity to major Parisian film studios, the region has regularly served as a filming location for French cinema.

Notably, the local ponds (the Étangs de la Mauldre) served as a backdrop for iconic scenes in Robert Lamoureux's cult comedy Mais où est donc passée la septième compagnie? (1973). The body of water was specifically used for the famous swimming scene where Sergeant-Chief Chaudard (played by Pierre Mondy) gives a swimming demonstration while Soldier Pithivier (Jean Lefebvre) asks the famous line, "Je le fais bien, chef ?" ("Am I doing it well, chief?").

== See also ==
- Communes of the Yvelines department
