= Pascal Thévenot =

French politician

Mayor of Vélizy-Villacoublay
- Incumbent
- Assumed office 4 April 2014
- Preceded by: Joël Loison

Member of the National Assembly for Yvelines's 2nd constituency
- In office 21 March 2016 – 20 June 2017
- Preceded by: Valérie Pécresse
- Succeeded by: Jean-Noël Barrot

Personal details
- Born: 3 June 1966 (age 60) Paris, France
- Party: The Republicans

Pascal Thévenot (French: [paskal tevəno]; born 3 June 1966) is a French politician who was the Republican Member of Parliament for Yvelines's 2nd constituency from 2016 to 2017.
