= Yvelines's 2nd constituency =

Constituency of the National Assembly of France

2nd constituency of Yvelines
- inline Constituency of the National Assembly of France

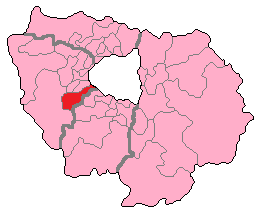
- Yvelines' 1st Constituency shown within Île-de-France
- Deputy: Anne Bergantz; MoDem
- Department: Yvelines
- Cantons: Chevreuse · Vélizy-Villacoublay · Versailles-Sud (Part)
- Registered voters: 83,176

The 2nd constituency of Yvelines is a French legislative constituency in the Yvelines département.

== Description ==
The 2nd constituency of Yvelines includes part of Versailles as well as the areas to its immediate south and west.

Like much of eastern Yvelines, the seat is dominated by the wealthy suburbs to the west of Paris. The seat was staunchly conservative, having voted for the Republicans, Union for a Popular Movement, and its predecessor Rally for the Republic at every election since 1988 prior to 2017. Its deputy from 2002 to 2016, Valérie Pécresse, served as a minister during the premiership of François Fillon.

== Historic representation ==
Election	Member	Party
1958	Jean-Paul Palewski	UNR
1962	Jean-Paul Palewski	UNR
1967	Jean-Paul Palewski	UDR
1968	Jean-Paul Palewski	UDR
1973	Jean-Paul Palewski	UDR
1978	Michel Péricard	RPR
1981	Michel Péricard	RPR
1986	Proportional representation – no election by constituency	
1988	Franck Borotra	RPR
1993	Franck Borotra	RPR
1997	Franck Borotra	RPR
2002	Valérie Pécresse	UMP
2007	Valérie Pécresse	UMP
2012	Valérie Pécresse	UMP
2016	Pascal Thévenot	LR
2017	Jean-Noël Barrot	LREM
2017	Jean-Noël Barrot	MoDem
2022	Jean-Noël Barrot	MoDem
2022	Anne Bergantz	MoDem

== Election results ==
=== 2024 ===
Candidate	Party	Alliance	First round			Second round		
Candidate	Party	Alliance	Votes	%	+/–	Votes	%	+/–
Jean-Noël Barrot	MoDem	ENS	22,500	35.01	+0.13	43,607	72.69	+37.68
Maïté Carrive-Bédouani	LÉ	NFP	16,893	26.29	+3.63	WITHDREW		
Gaetan Brault	RN		14,013	21.81	+13.36	16,383	27.31	+5.50
Pascal Thévenot	LR		9,327	14.51	-0.06			
Philippe Loire	REC		893	1.39	-6.79			
Marielle Saulnier	LO		486	0.76	+0.19			
Bertrand Hugon	DIV		153	0.24	N/A			
Valid votes			64,265	98.50	-0.25	59,990	95.39	-3.11
Blank votes			701	1.07	+0.14	2,318	3.69	+2.62
Null votes			275	0.42	+0.11	583	0.93	+0.51
Turnout			65,241	75.01	+16.64	62,891	72.30	-2.71
Abstentions			21,738	24.99	-16.64	24,100	27.70	+2.71
Registered voters			86,979			86,991		
Source: Ministry of the Interior, Le Monde
Result						MoDEM		

=== 2022 by-election ===
The 2022 election was threatened by annulment due to Anne Grignon being both substitute for a deputy and substitute for a senator (Martin Lévrier, in violation of the electoral code. In order to avoid the cancellation of the election, Anne Grignon resigned from her mandate as deputy on 12 August 2022.

On 4 July 2022 Jean-Noël Barrot was appointed Deputy Minister in charge of the Digital Transition and Telecommunications. Consequently, he should have been replaced in the National Assembly on 3 August 2022 by his resigning substitute, Anne Grignon, for the duration of the exercise of his governmental functions. Due to her resignation, a by-election was called.

A by-election was therefore called for 2 October 2022 to fill the vacant seat in this constituency. The second round of voting took place on 9 October 2022. Due to Jean-Noël Barrot being a minister in office, he was replaced in the National Assembly for the duration of these functions by his deputy, Anne Bergantz.

2022 by-election: Yvelines's 2nd constituency
Party	Candidate	Votes	%	±%
MoDem (Ensemble)	Jean-Noël Barrot	9,635	42.29	+7.41
EELV (NUPÉS)	Maïté Carrive-Bedouani	4,237	18.60	-4.06
LR (UDC)	Pascal Thévenot	4,055	17.80	+3.23
REC	Laurence Trochu	2,521	11.26	+2.88
RN	Anne Jacqmin	1,965	8.62	+0.17
RE	Pascal Casimir-Perrier*	371	1.63	−0.91
Turnout		23,130	26.27	−32.10
2nd round result
MoDem (Ensemble)	Jean-Noël Barrot	12,707	71.67	+7.40
EELV (NUPÉS)	Maïté Carrive-Bedouani	5,022	28.33	−7.40
Turnout		19,227	22.17	−22.83
MoDem hold				

* Renaissance dissident

=== 2022 ===
Legislative Election 2022: Yvelines's 2nd constituency
Party	Candidate	Votes	%	±%
MoDem (Ensemble)	Jean-Noël Barrot	17,391	34.88	-8.96
EELV (NUPÉS)	Maïté Carrive-Bedouani	11,296	22.66	+9.16
LR (UDC)	Pascal Thévenot	7,262	14.57	−8.01
RN	Gaëtan Brault	4,215	8.45	+2.71
REC	Céline Jullié	4,078	8.18	N/A
DVE	Jérémy Bizet	2,310	4.63	N/A
DIV	Pascal Casimir-Perrier	1,268	2.54	−0.69
Others	N/A	2,035	4.08	
Turnout		49,855	58.37	+0.73
2nd round result
MoDem (Ensemble)	Jean-Noël Barrot	28,559	64.27	+5.97
EELV (NUPÉS)	Maïté Carrive-Bedouani	15,880	35.73	N/A
Turnout		44,439	55.00	+8.09
MoDem hold				

=== 2017 ===
Legislative Election 2017: Yvelines's 2nd constituency
Party	Candidate	Votes	%	±%
LREM	Jean-Noël Barrot	21,581	43.84	
LR	Pascal Thévenot	11,115	22.58	
LFI	Marc Soriano	3,583	7.28	
EELV	Tanguy Ruellan	3,062	6.22	
FN	Yasmine Benzelmat	2,828	5.74	
DIV	Pascal Casimir-Perrier	1,591	3.23	
DVD	Pascal Poirot	1,525	3.10	
Others	N/A	3,946		
Turnout		49,231	57.64	
2nd round result
LREM	Jean-Noël Barrot	23,361	58.30	
LR	Pascal Thévenot	16,711	41.70	
Turnout		40,072	46.91	
LREM gain from LR				

=== 2016 by-election ===
2016 by-election: Yvelines's 2nd constituency
Party	Candidate	Votes	%	±%
LR	Pascal Thévenot	11,123	46.05	
PS	Tristan Jacques	3,135	12.98	
Yvelines pour tous	Benjamin La Combe	2,308	9.56	
FN	Vincent Collo	2,265	9.38	
EELV	Juliette Nitecki Sniter	1,755	7.27	
Others	N/A	3,566	14.76	
Turnout		24,626	29.25	
2nd round result
LR	Pascal Thévenot	14,872	72.25	
PS	Tristan Jacques	5,713	27.75	
Turnout		21,989	26.12	
LR hold				

=== 2012 ===
Legislative Election 2012: Yvelines's 2nd constituency
Party	Candidate	Votes	%	±%
UMP	Valérie Pécresse	23,931	46.30	
PS	Jacques Lollioz	15,783	30.54	
FN	François Simeoni	4,391	8.50	
MoDem	Flavien Bazenet	2,038	3.94	
EELV	Brigitte Bouchet	1,949	3.77	
FG	Esther Penouilh	1,745	3.38	
Others	N/A	1,847		
Turnout		52,069	62.60	
2nd round result
UMP	Valérie Pécresse	28,687	58.67	
PS	Jacques Lollioz	20,212	41.33	
Turnout		49,992	60.10	
UMP hold				

=== 2007 ===
Legislative Election 2007: Yvelines's 2nd constituency
Party	Candidate	Votes	%	±%
UMP	Valérie Pécresse	26,924	54.80	
PS	Véronique Fafin	9,058	18.44	
MoDem	Edmond Kameni	5,147	10.48	
LV	Patrick Planque	2,388	4.86	
FN	Michel Golliard	1,565	3.19	
PCF	Esther Penouilh	1,116	2.27	
Others	N/A	2,932		
Turnout		49,636	64.44	
UMP hold				

=== 2002 ===
Legislative Election 2002: Yvelines's 2nd constituency
Party	Candidate	Votes	%	±%
UMP	Valérie Pécresse	21,368	42.64	
PRG	Anne Nègre	11,687	23.32	
UDF	Philippe Morillon	5,783	11.54	
FN	Gérard Dantan	3,886	7.75	
LV	Jean-Bernard Gramunt	1,713	3.42	
PCF	Esther Penouilh	1,087	2.17	
DVD	Alain Chitrit	1,009	2.01	
Others	N/A	3,584		
Turnout		50,726	68.64	
2nd round result
UMP	Valérie Pécresse	29,248	65.11	
PRG	Anne Nègre	15,674	34.89	
Turnout		46,299	62.66	
UMP hold				

=== 1997 ===
Legislative Election 1997: Yvelines's 2nd constituency
Party	Candidate	Votes	%	±%
RPR	Franck Borotra	18,555	39.75	
PS	Jacques Lollioz	10,440	22.37	
FN	Philippe Colombani	5,896	12.63	
PCF	Antoine Casanova	2,464	5.28	
LV	François Schafer	2,407	5.16	
GE	Dominique Julien-Labruyere	2,127	4.56	
DVD	Jean-Gérard Gabriau	2,049	4.39	
DIV	Isabelle Siksik	1,013	2.17	
Others	N/A	1,728		
Turnout		48,648	67.34	
2nd round result
RPR	Franck Borotra	29,401	60.60	
PS	Jacques Lollioz	19,113	39.40	
Turnout		51,178	70.84	
RPR hold				

== Sources ==
Official results of French elections from 2002: "Résultats électoraux officiels en France" (in French).
