= Mauldre =

River in France

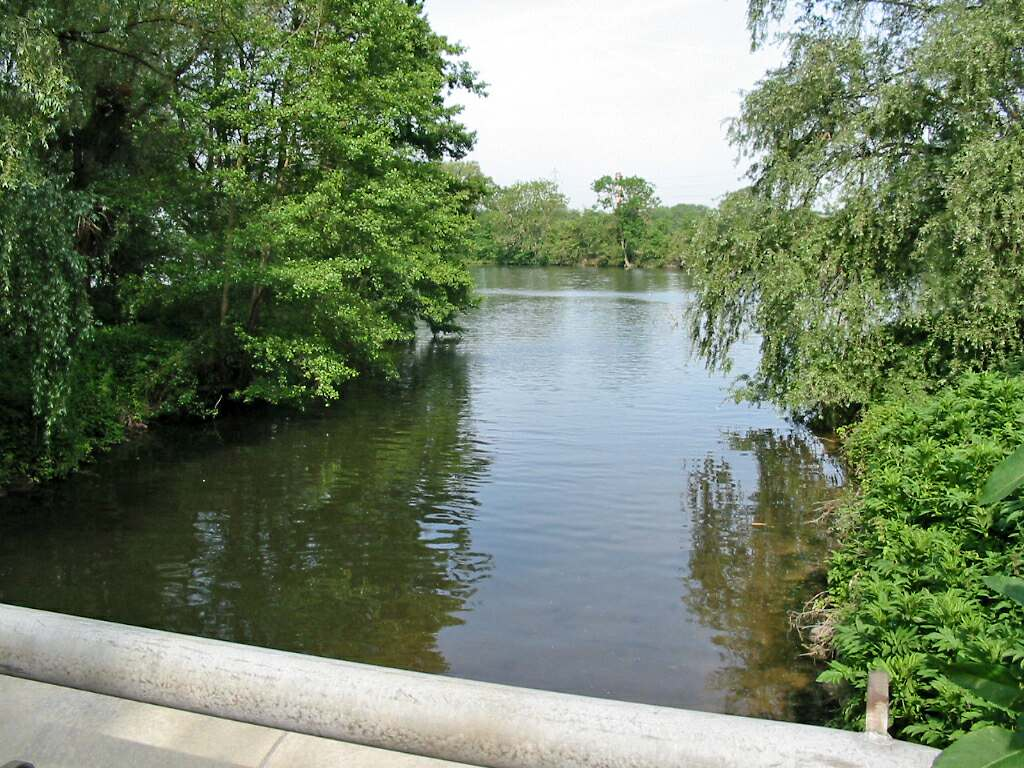

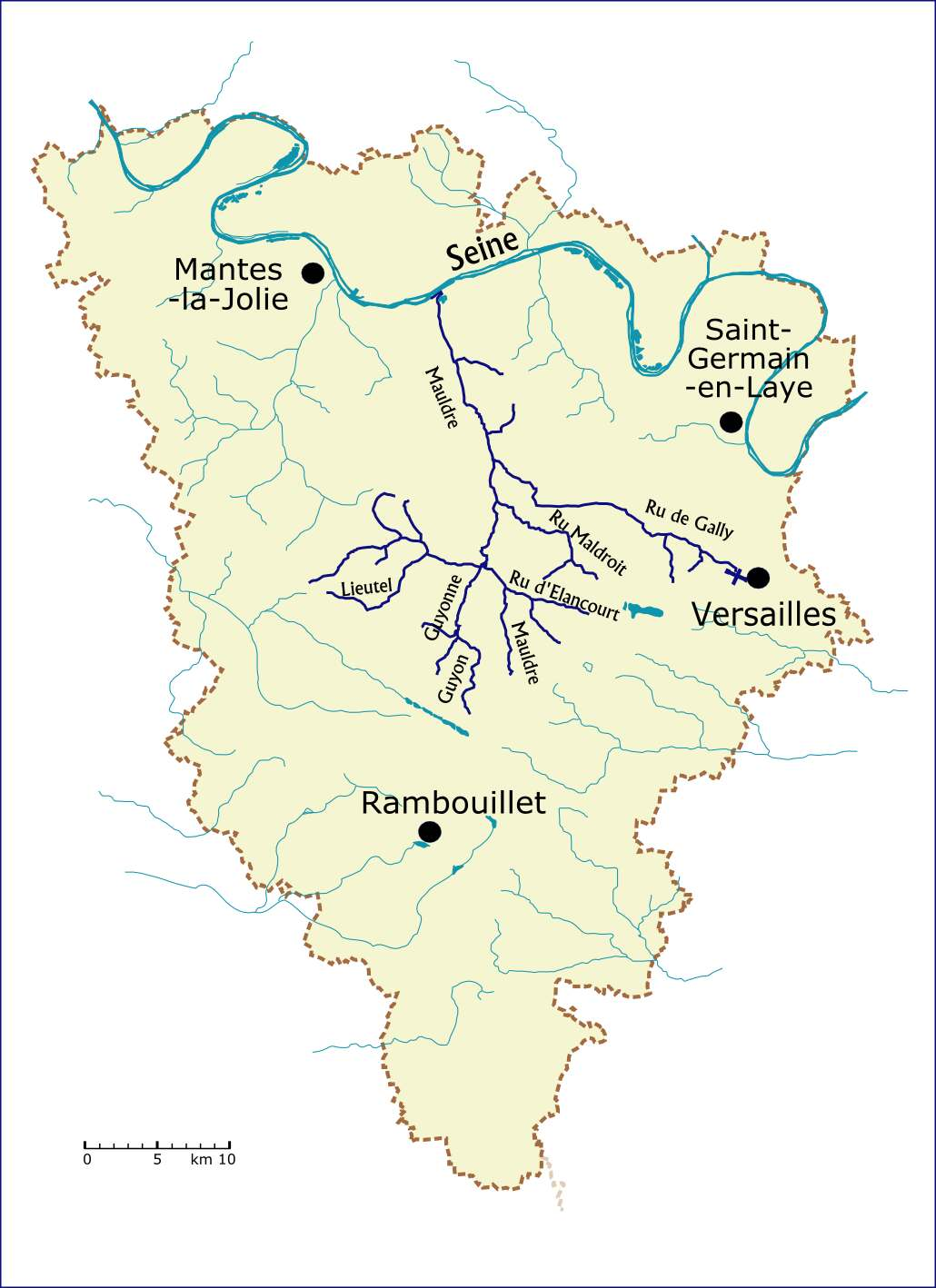

Location
- Country: France

Physical characteristics
- Mouth: Seine
  - coordinates: 48.9732°N 1.8127°E
- Length: 34,7 km
- Basin size: 411,3 km2

Basin features
- Progression: Seine→ English Channel

The Mauldre (French pronunciation: [moldʁ]) is a 35 km long river in France. It is a left tributary of the Seine. Its basin area is about 410 square kilometres, which covers 66 municipalities corresponding to 400 000 inhabitants. Its source elevation is 135 m. The Mauldre flows into the Seine near Épône.

One of its affluents is the ru de Gally, whose source is in the gardens of Versailles.

== Course ==
The Mauldre starts at an altitude of 135 m near the hamlet of Maison Blanche at the limit of the municipalities of Saint-Rémy-l'Honoré and Coignières, and turns north along its entire route.

It runs through Beynes and Maule, before flowing into the Seine at Épône at an altitude of 20 m, towards the upstream point of the island of Rangiport. The average slope is therefore 3.25 m/km (0.33%).

Its confluence with the Ru de Gally marks the boundary between the basins of the upper Mauldre (which can generally be forded) and the lower Mauldre.

In the lower basin, the Mauldre draws a few meanders and is subdivided in a few places into secondary branches, sometimes called "chevreuses" as in Maule and Aulnay-sur-Mauldre.

The Mauldre valley is tucked in between the plateaus that make up the plain of Versailles and the Mantois. It is used by communication axes that connect the Seine valley to the center and south of Yvelines: RD 191, from Mantes to Corbeil and the Épône-Mézières to Plaisir-Grignon railway line.

A little upstream from Beynes, it is crossed by a 922 m siphon, by the Avre aqueduct, which supplies Paris with drinking water collected in the region of Verneuil-sur-Avre (Eure).

It is a valley, dotted with numerous villages which have kept their rural character despite the proximity of the Parisian agglomeration. Many mills were once in operation along its course.
