= Yves Vandewalle =

French politician (born 1950)

Yves Vandewalle (born 5 June 1950 in Freiburg im Breisgau) is a member of the National Assembly of France. He represents the Yvelines department, and is a member of the Union for a Popular Movement.
