= Coignières =

- Commune
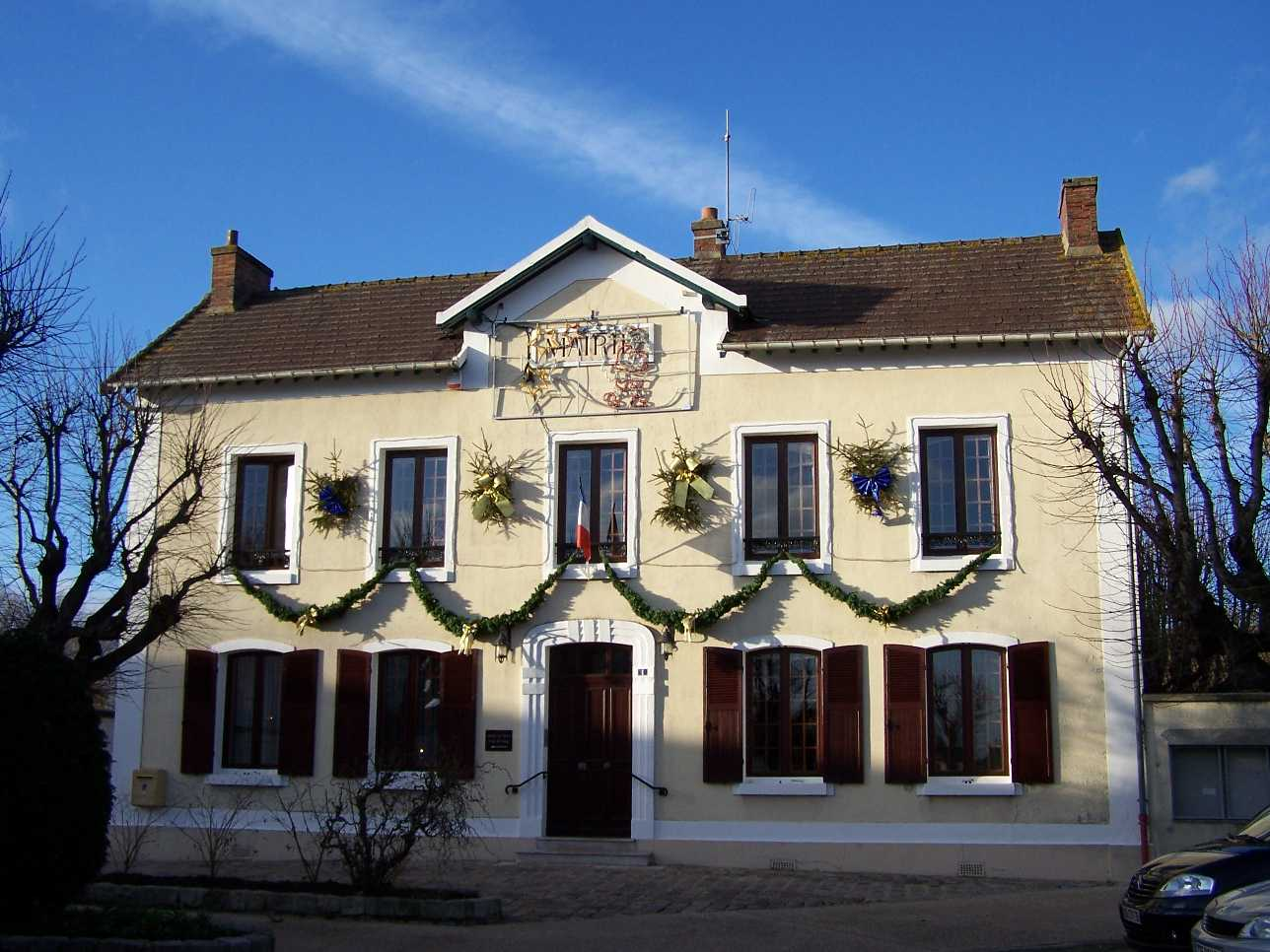
- Town hall

- Coat of arms
- Location of Coignières
- Location within France Location within Île-de-France (region)
- Coordinates: 48°44′53″N 1°55′16″E
- Country: France
- Region: Île-de-France
- Department: Yvelines
- Arrondissement: Rambouillet
- Canton: Maurepas
- Intercommunality: Saint-Quentin-en-Yvelines

Government
  - Mayor (2020–2026): Didier Fischer
- Area^{1}: 8.27 km^{2} (3.19 sq mi)
- Elevation: 169 m (554 ft)
- Highest elevation: 178 m (584 ft)
- Lowest elevation: 99 m (325 ft)
- Population (2023): 4,321
  - Density: 522/km^{2} (1,350/sq mi)
- Time zone: UTC+01:00 (CET)
  - Summer (DST): UTC+02:00 (CEST)
- INSEE/Postal code: 78168 /78310
- ^{1} French Land Register data, which excludes lakes, ponds, glaciers > 1 km^{2} (0.386 sq mi or 247 acres) and river estuaries.

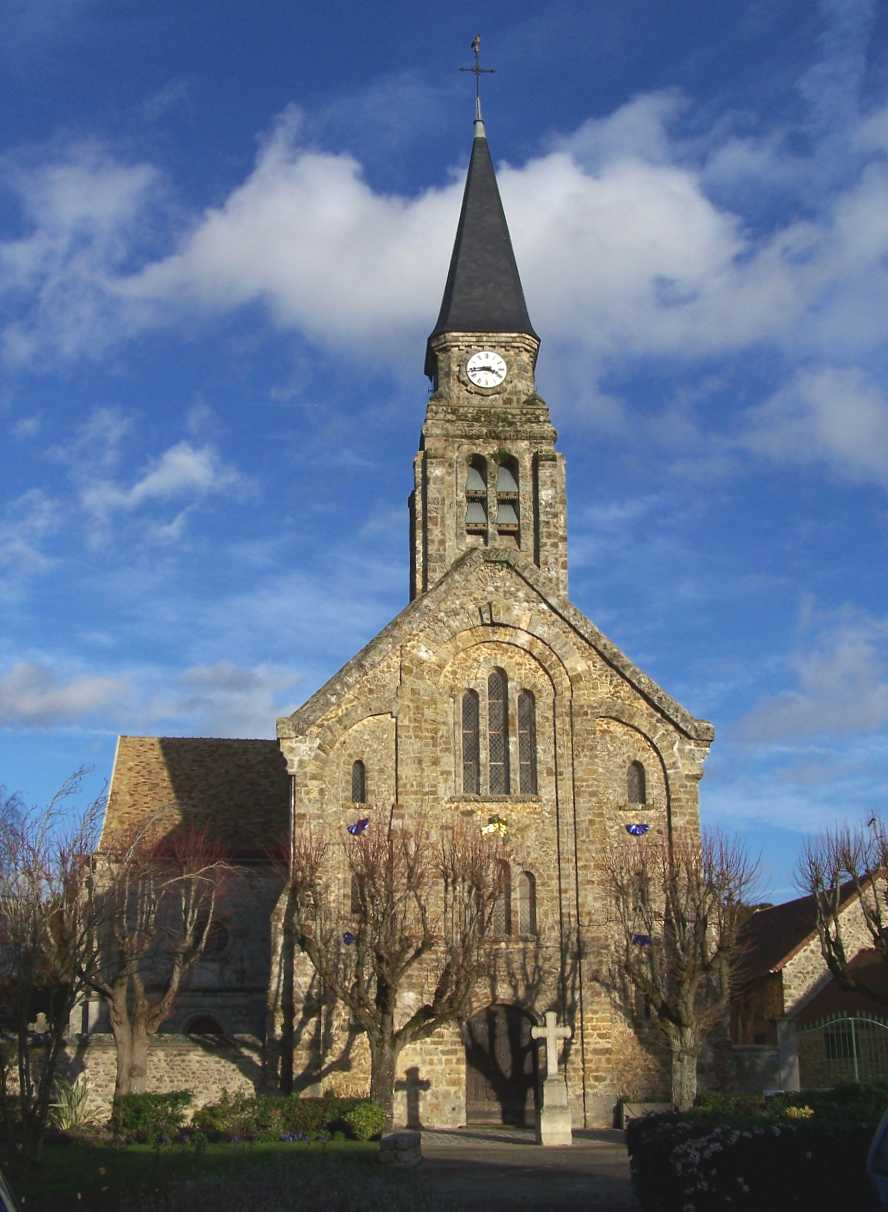
Saint-Germain-d'Auxerre

Coignières (French pronunciation: [kwaɲɛʁ]) is a French commune in the Yvelines department, region of Île-de-France.

== Geography ==
Coignières is situated 18 km (11 mi) southwest of Versailles. Its neighbours include Maurepas to the north, Mesnil-Saint-Denis and Lévis-Saint-Nom to the east, Essarts-le-Roi to the south and Saint-Rémy-l'Honoré to the west.

The village is roughly 170 m above sea level, fairly flat except to the west where there is a valley with the Mauldre river which runs from the area called la Maison Blanche to the north.

Coignières is connected by route nationale 10 (RN10), which traverses the commune from the northeast to the southwest, and given the amount of traffic it effectively divides the commune in two. Coignières train station is located on the Paris–Chartres train line and runs parallel to the RN10.

The commune is quite well developed with new housing and commercial zones near Maurepas and beyond the Saint-Quentin-en-Yvelines region. There is also a large industrial zone (le Marais) between the RN10 and the railway line.

Part of the commune to the west is still a partly wooded rural area (Bois des Hautes Bruyères).

Finally, the GR 11 footpath also cuts across the commune from east to west.

== Population ==
Historical population
Year	Pop.	±% p.a.
1968	987	—
1975	1,799	+8.95%
1982	3,786	+11.22%
1990	4,157	+1.18%
1999	4,231	+0.20%
2007	4,411	+0.52%
2012	4,384	−0.12%
2017	4,394	+0.05%
2023	4,321	−0.28%
Source: INSEE

== Education ==
There are two preschools and elementary schools, École Gabriel Bouvet and École Marcel Pagnol, as well as one junior high school, Collège d'Enseignement Secondaire « La Mare aux Saules ».

== See also ==
- Communes of the Yvelines department
