= Les Bréviaires =

- Commune
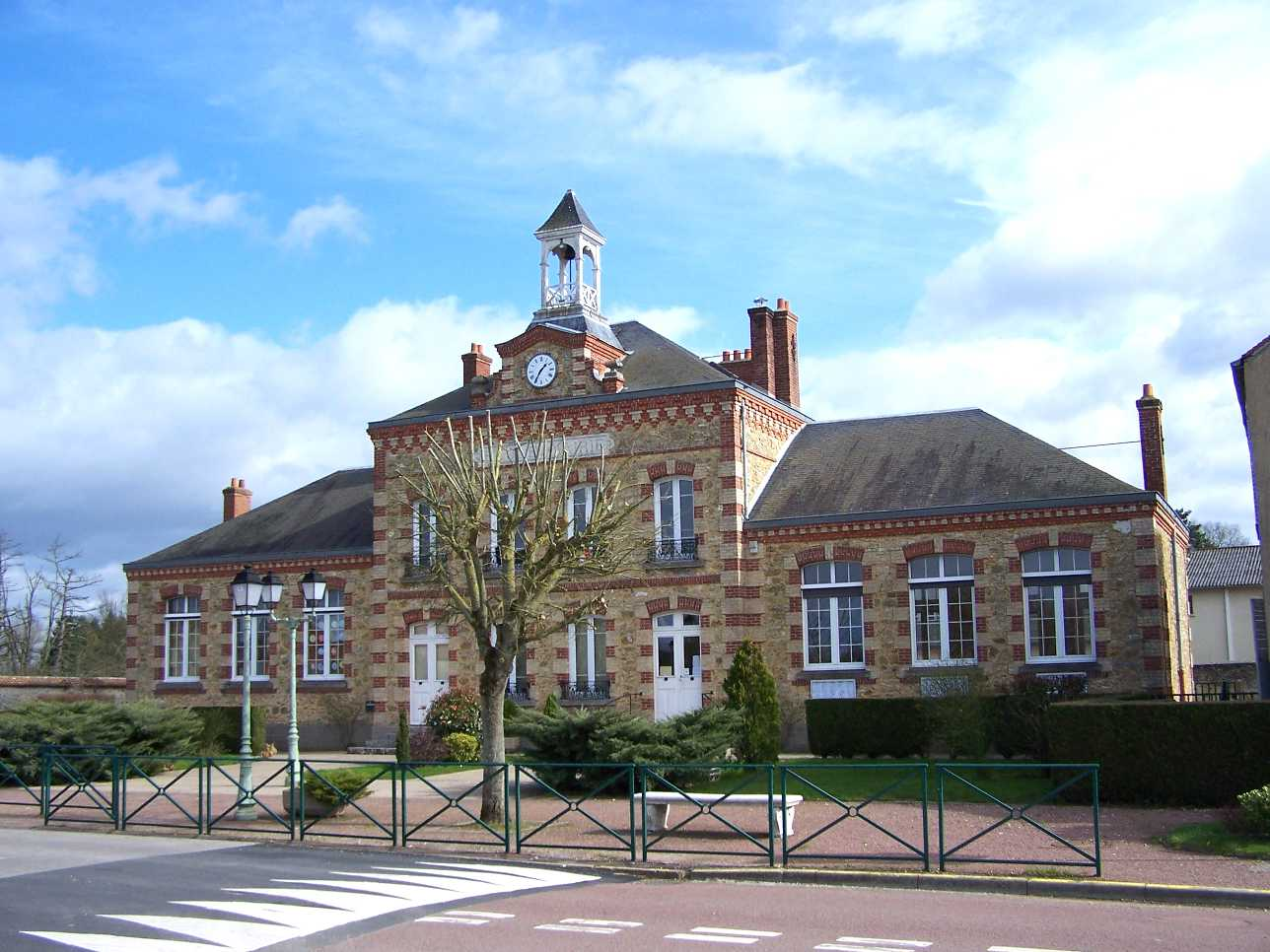
- Town hall

- Coat of arms
- Location of Les Bréviaires
- Location within France Location within Île-de-France (region)
- Coordinates: 48°42′31″N 1°48′53″E
- Country: France
- Region: Île-de-France
- Department: Yvelines
- Arrondissement: Rambouillet
- Canton: Rambouillet
- Intercommunality: CA Rambouillet Territoires

Government
  - Mayor (2020–2026): Jacques Formenty
- Area^{1}: 19.55 km^{2} (7.55 sq mi)
- Elevation: 170 m (560 ft)
- Highest elevation: 186 m (610 ft)
- Lowest elevation: 139 m (456 ft)
- Population (2023): 1,302
  - Density: 66.60/km^{2} (172.5/sq mi)
- Time zone: UTC+01:00 (CET)
  - Summer (DST): UTC+02:00 (CEST)
- INSEE/Postal code: 78108 /78610
- ^{1} French Land Register data, which excludes lakes, ponds, glaciers > 1 km^{2} (0.386 sq mi or 247 acres) and river estuaries.

Les Bréviaires (French pronunciation: [le bʁevjɛʁ]) is a commune in the Yvelines department in the Île-de-France region in north-central France.

== See also ==
- Communes of the Yvelines department
