= Le Perray-en-Yvelines =

- Commune
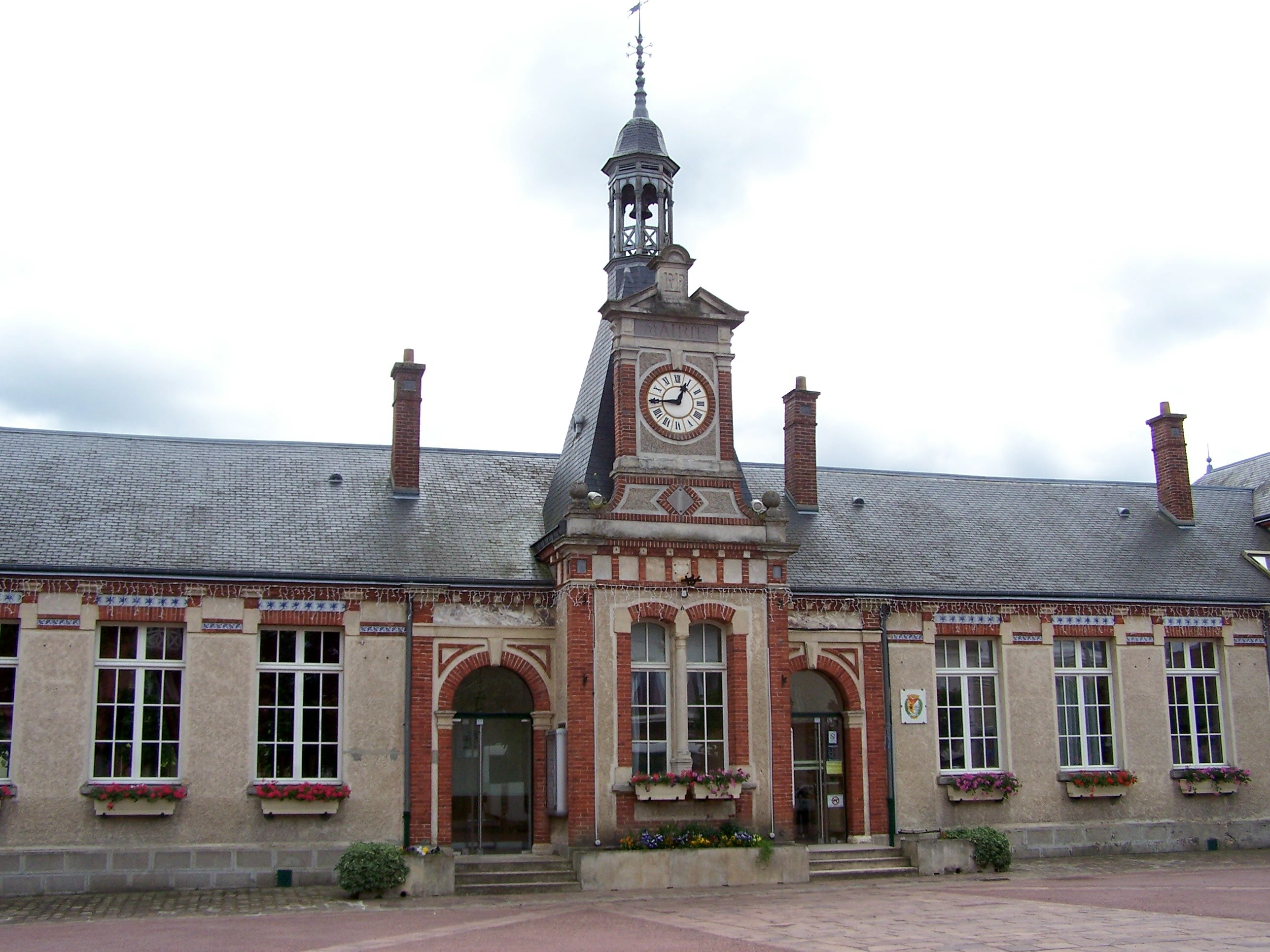
- The town hall in Le Perray-en-Yvelines

- Coat of arms
- Location of Le Perray-en-Yvelines
- Location within France Location within Île-de-France (region)
- Coordinates: 48°41′41″N 1°51′18″E
- Country: France
- Region: Île-de-France
- Department: Yvelines
- Arrondissement: Rambouillet
- Canton: Rambouillet
- Intercommunality: CA Rambouillet Territoires

Government
  - Mayor (2020–2026): Geoffroy Bax de Keating
- Area^{1}: 13.47 km^{2} (5.20 sq mi)
- Elevation: 175 m (574 ft)
- Highest elevation: 179 m (587 ft)
- Lowest elevation: 155 m (509 ft)
- Population (2023): 6,480
  - Density: 481/km^{2} (1,250/sq mi)
- Time zone: UTC+01:00 (CET)
  - Summer (DST): UTC+02:00 (CEST)
- INSEE/Postal code: 78486 /78610
- ^{1} French Land Register data, which excludes lakes, ponds, glaciers > 1 km^{2} (0.386 sq mi or 247 acres) and river estuaries.

Le Perray-en-Yvelines (French pronunciation: [lə peʁɛ ɑ̃.n‿ivlin]) is a commune in the Yvelines department in the west of Île-de-France in north-central France.

== Population ==
Historical population
Year	Pop.	±% p.a.
1968	2,341	—
1975	3,001	+3.61%
1982	4,016	+4.25%
1990	4,645	+1.84%
1999	5,828	+2.55%
2007	6,427	+1.23%
2012	6,680	+0.78%
2017	6,724	+0.13%
2023	6,480	−0.61%
Source: INSEE

== See also ==
- Communes of the Yvelines department
