= Lévis-Saint-Nom =

- Commune
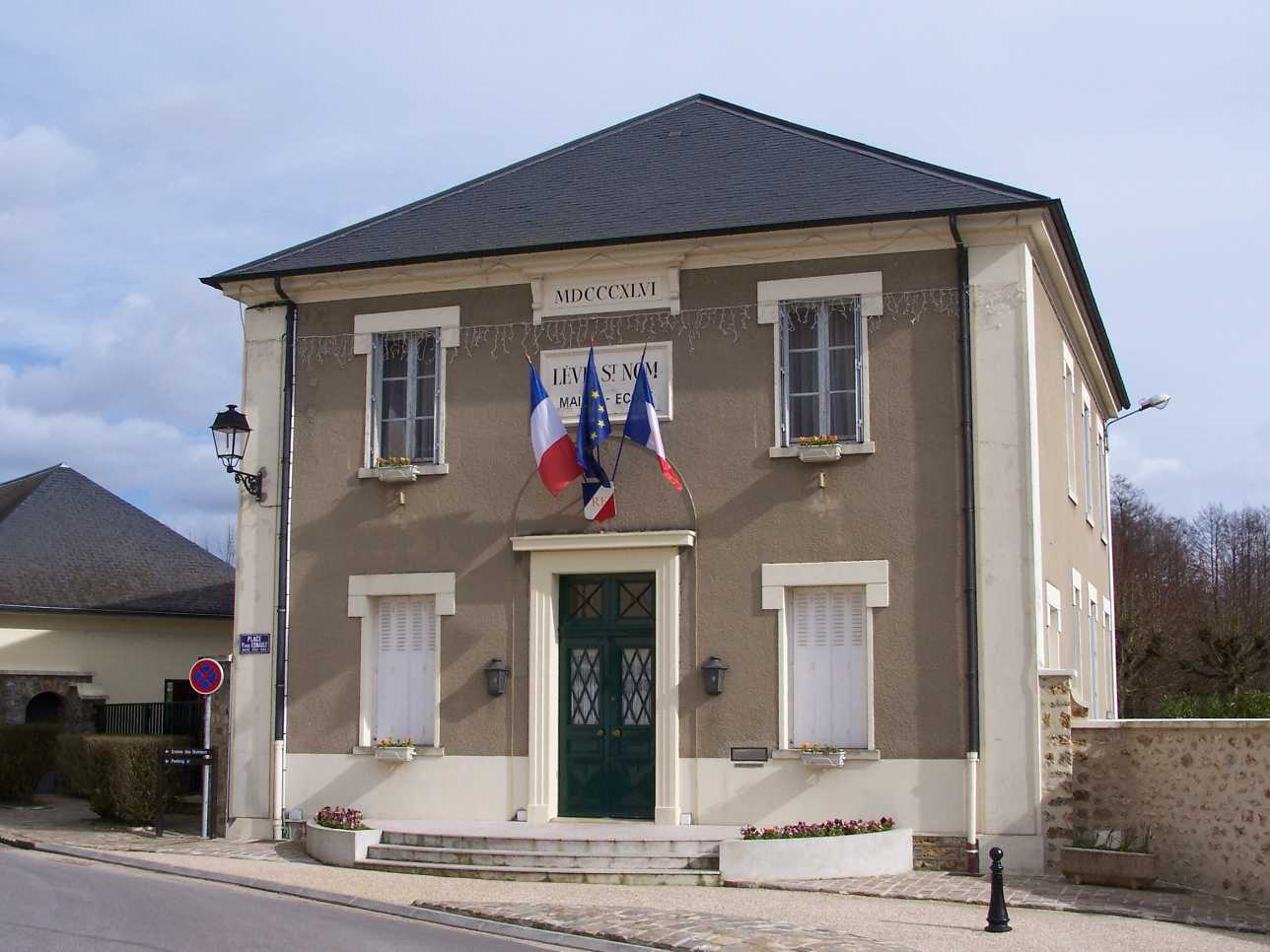
- Town hall

- Coat of arms
- Location of Lévis-Saint-Nom
- Location within France Location within Île-de-France (region)
- Coordinates: 48°43′20″N 1°56′58″E
- Country: France
- Region: Île-de-France
- Department: Yvelines
- Arrondissement: Rambouillet
- Canton: Maurepas

Government
  - Mayor (2020–2026): Anne Grignon
- Area^{1}: 8.25 km^{2} (3.19 sq mi)
- Elevation: 142 m (466 ft)
- Highest elevation: 174 m (571 ft)
- Lowest elevation: 103 m (338 ft)
- Population (2023): 1,603
  - Density: 194/km^{2} (503/sq mi)
- Time zone: UTC+01:00 (CET)
  - Summer (DST): UTC+02:00 (CEST)
- INSEE/Postal code: 78334 /78320
- ^{1} French Land Register data, which excludes lakes, ponds, glaciers > 1 km^{2} (0.386 sq mi or 247 acres) and river estuaries.

Lévis-Saint-Nom is a commune in the Yvelines department in the Île-de-France region in north-central France.

== See also ==
- Communes of the Yvelines department
