= Grand Versailles bus network =

Public bus network in France

Grand Versailles
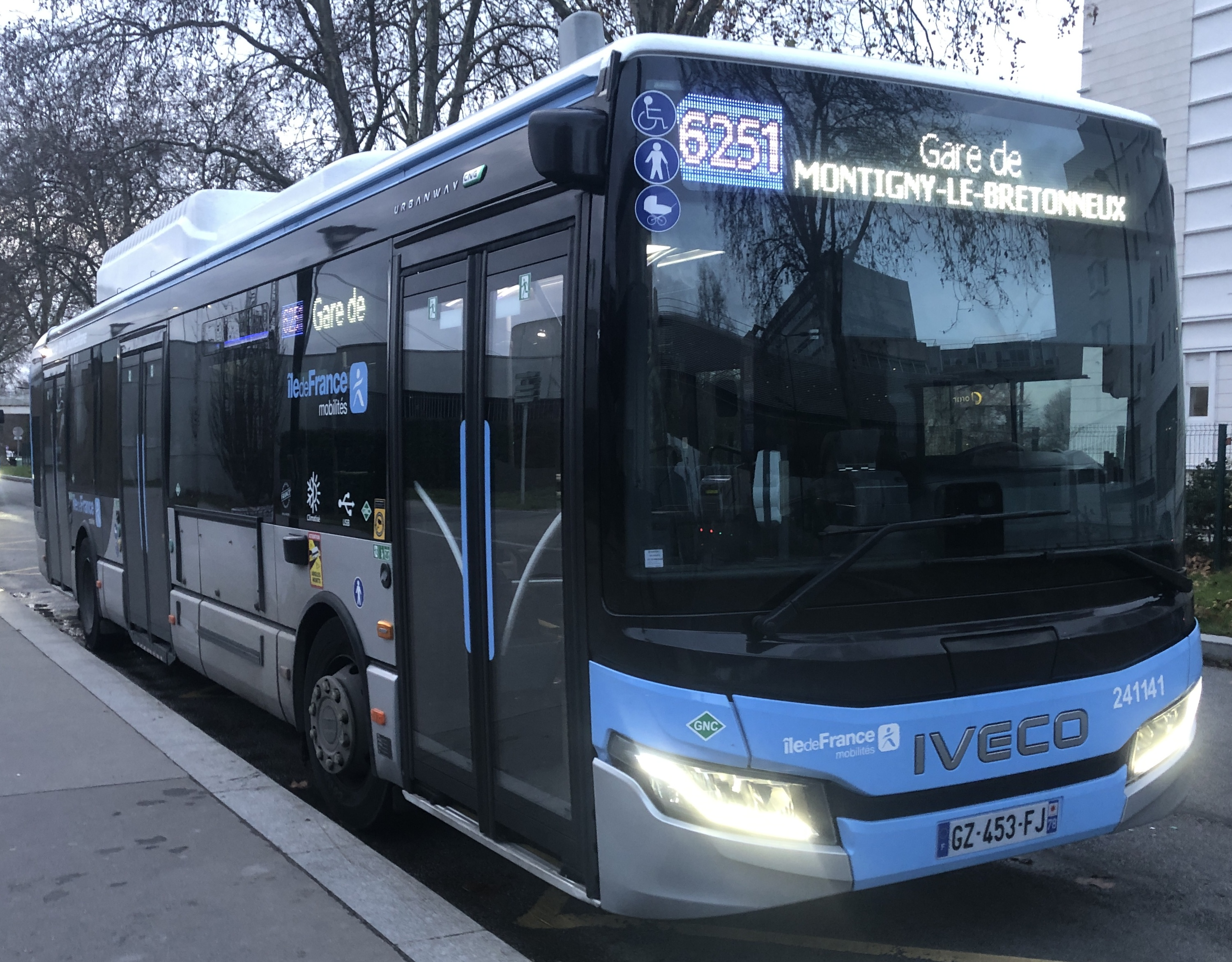
- Iveco Urbanway 12 GNV n°241141 on line 6251 at Gare de Saint-Quentin-en-Yvelines, Montigny-le-Bretonneux.
- Parent: Île-de-France Mobilités
- Founded: August 1, 2023
- Service area: Yvelines: (Bailly, Bois-d'Arcy, Bougival, Buc, La Celle-Saint-Cloud, Le Chesnay-Rocquencourt, Croissy-sur-Seine, Fontenay-le-Fleury, Guyancourt, Louveciennes, Montigny-le-Bretonneux, Noisy-le-Roi, Le Pecq, Le Port-Marly, Saint-Cyr-l'École, Saint-Germain-en-Laye, Saint-Nom-la-Bretèche, Versailles, Le Vésinet, Viroflay); Hauts-de-Seine: (Boulogne-Billancourt, Garches, Marnes-la-Coquette, Rueil-Malmaison, Saint-Cloud, Vaucresson)
- Routes: 6201 6202 6203 6204 6205; 6206 6207 6208 6209 6210; 6211 6213 6214 6216 6217; 6227 6230 6231 6240 6241; 6243 6246 6251 6252 6253; 6254 6276 6280 6281 6282; 6283 6284 6285 6286 6287; 6288
- Operator: Transdev (Transdev Versailles)

Grand Versailles is a French bus network run by Île-de-France Mobilités and the communauté d'agglomération Versailles Grand Parc, operated by Transdev through his subsidiary Transdev Versailles from August 1, 2023.

It consists of 36 lines serving the Communauté d'agglomération Versailles Grand Parc.

== History ==
Before the opening to the competition of transports in Île-de-France, the bus lines were integrated to these networks: Hourtoule, Phébus, STAVO and Transdev Ecquevilly.

=== Network development ===
==== Development of lines operated by Hourtoule ====
Before the opening to the competition, the lines 11, 41 and 111 were operated by Cars Hourtoule.

==== Development of lines operated by Phébus ====
Before the opening to the competition, the 1, 2, 3, 4, 5, 6, 7, 8, 9, 10, 13, 14, 105, 106, 107 through Keolis Versailles, and the lines 52, 53 and 54 through Keolis Yvelines were operated by Phébus.

==== Development of lines operated by the STAVO ====
Before the opening to the competition, the lines 40, 43 and 51 were operated by the STAVO (Société de transport automobile de Versailles Ouest).

==== Development of lines operated by Transdev Ecquevilly ====
Before the opening to the competition, the lines 6, 27, 28, 29, 30, 38, 54, 55 and 460 were operated by Transdev Ecquevilly.

=== Opening to the competition ===
Due to the opening to the competition of public transport in Île-de-France, the network of Grand Versailles was founded on August 1, 2023, corresponding to public service delegation number 28 established by Île-de-France Mobilités.

A call for tenders was therefore launched by the organizing authority to designate a company that will operate the network for a period of five years. It was finally Transdev who gain the operation, through his subsidiary Transdev Versailles, which was designated during the board of directors on March 6, 2023.

At the time of its opening to the competition, the network consisted of the lines shown in the table below:

List of the lines of Saint-Germain – Boucles de Seine
Oldest network	Lines
Cars Hourtoule	11, 41, 111
Phébus	1, 2, 3, 4, 5, 6, 7, 8, 9, 10, 13, 14, 52, 53, 54, 105, 106, 107
STAVO	40, 43, 51
Transdev Ecquevilly	6, 27, 28, 29, 30, 38, 54, 55 and 460

==== Restructuration of the network ====
From January 8, 2024, the lines were renamed, in accordance with the single regional numbering system planned by Île-de-France Mobilités in order to remove duplicated lines. The new lines will all begin with the prefix "62", followed by the last two digits of the old number, as soon as possible.

The correspondence between old and new numbers is as follows:

Network renaming
Old	New
1	6201
2	6202
3	6203
4	6204
5	6205
6V	6206
7	6207
8	6208
9	6209
10	6210
11	6211
13	6213
14	6214
6L	6216
17	6217
27	6227
30	6230
28; 29	6231
40	6240
41	6241
43	6243
460	6246
51	6251
52	6252
53	6253
54	6254
76	6276
38	6280
54S	6281
55	6282
71	6283
105	6284
106	6285
107	6286
111	6287
177	6288

== Routes ==
Image	Line	First direction	Second direction
	6201	Versailles – Picardie	Le Chesnay-Rocquencourt – Centre Commercial Parly 2
	6202	Versailles – Porchefontaine Louis XIV	Gare de La Celle-Saint-Cloud
	6203	Versailles – Satory	Le Chesnay-Rocquencourt – Hôpital André Mignot
	6204	Gare de Versailles-Chantiers	Versailles – Pershing
	6205	Versailles – Bernard de Jussieu	Le Chesnay-Rocquencourt – Cœur de Bourg
	6206	Gare de Viroflay-Rive-Gauche	Versailles – Mobilab
	6207	Gare de Viroflay-Rive-Gauche	Le Chesnay-Rocquencourt – Centre Commercial Parly 2
	6208	Versailles – Les Grands Chênes	Le Chesnay-Rocquencourt – Centre Commercial Parly 2
	6209	Gare de Garches - Marnes-la-Coquette; Gare de Vaucresson	Le Chesnay-Rocquencourt – Centre Commercial Parly 2
	6210	Versailles – Lycée Jules Ferry	Gare de Vaucresson
	6211	Gare de Versailles-Chantiers	Bois-d'Arcy – Erich Von Stroheim
	6213	Gare de Versailles-Chantiers	Versailles – Picardie
	6214	Versailles – Europe	Versailles – Près des Bois
	6216	Gare de Louveciennes	
	6217	Gare de Versailles-Rive-Droite	Saint-Nom-la-Bretèche – Guitel Lecoq
	6227	Gare de La Celle-Saint-Cloud	Gare de Rueil-Malmaison
	6230	Gare de La Celle-Saint-Cloud	La Celle-Saint-Cloud – Puits d'Angle
	6231	Gare de La Celle-Saint-Cloud	La Celle-Saint-Cloud – Étang Sec
	6240	Gare de Versailles-Chantiers	Gare de Fontenay-le-Fleury
	6241	Bois d'Arcy – René Clair	Gare de Fontenay-le-Fleury
	6243	Fontenay-le-Fleury – Parc Montaigne	Gare de Fontenay-le-Fleury
	6246	Boulogne-Billancourt – Gambetta	Gare de Vaucresson; Gare de La Celle-Saint-Cloud
	6251	Gare de Saint-Quentin-en-Yvelines - Montigny-le-Bretonneux	Le Chesnay-Rocquencourt – Hôpital André Mignot
	6252	Gare de Saint-Cyr (circular line)	
	6253	Gare de Saint-Cyr (circular line)	
	6254	Saint-Cyr-l'École – Rû de Gally	Saint-Cyr-l'École – Centre sportif Guyancourt – Droits de l'Homme
	6276	Gare de Vaucresson	Noisy-le-Roi — Cimetière; Noisy-le-Roi — Prés de Renneuil
	6280	Rueil-Malmaison — Centre CUCUFA	Gare de Louveciennes; La Celle-Saint-Cloud — Rousseau
	6281	Saint-Germain-en-Laye — Nicot; Saint-Germain-en-Laye — Lycée Léonard de Vinci; Saint-Germain-en-Laye — Lycée International	La Celle-Saint-Cloud — Rousseau; Bougival — Pont; Le Vésinet — Route de Croissy; Le Pecq — Jean Moulin
	6282	Versailles — Place Laboulaye; Le Chesnay-Rocquencourt — Blanche de Castille	Bougival — Pont; La Celle-Saint-Cloud — Bourg
	6283	La Celle-Saint-Cloud — Lycée Pierre Corneille	Noisy-le-Roi — Tuilerie Bignon; Noisy-le-Roi — Rond-point des Chênes
	6284	Buc — Collège Martin Luther King / Lycée Franco-Allemand	Garches — Mairie
	6285	Versailles — Place Laboulaye	Garches — Mairie
	6286	Vaucresson — Collège Yves du Manoir	Vaucresson — Victor Duret
	6287	Rueil-Malmaison — Centre CUCUFA; Rueil-Malmaison — Collège Passy-Buzenval	Gare de Versailles-Château-Rive-Gauche
	6288	Montigny-le-Bretonneux — Collège / Lycée Saint-Exupery	Saint-Cyr-l'École – Ferme de Gally

== See also ==
- Île-de-France Mobilités
- Communauté d'agglomération Versailles Grand Parc
