= Fontenay-le-Fleury =

- Commune
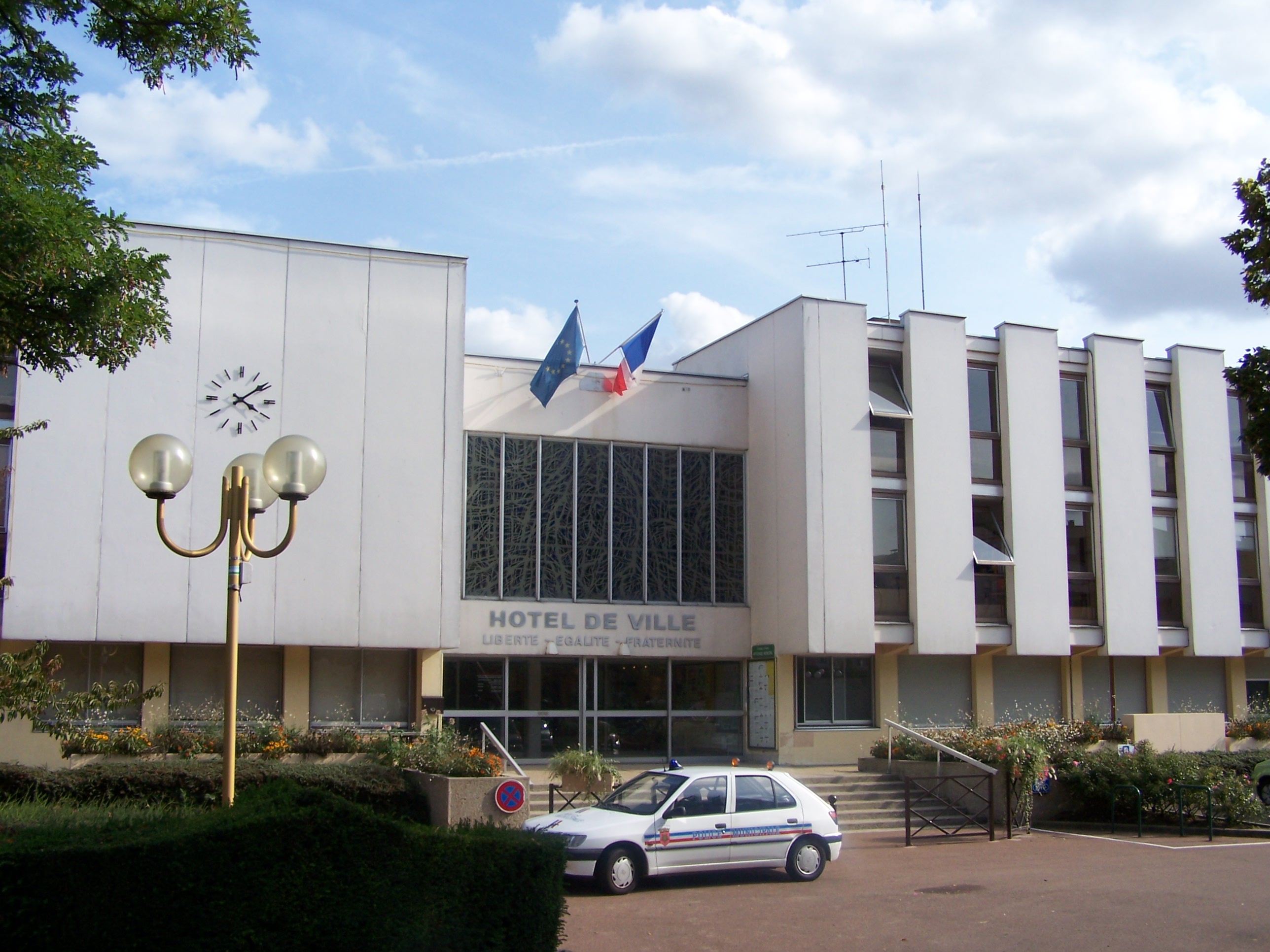
- Town hall (Mairie)

- Coat of arms
- Location of Fontenay-le-Fleury
- Location within France Location within Île-de-France (region)
- Coordinates: 48°48′52″N 2°02′58″E
- Country: France
- Region: Île-de-France
- Department: Yvelines
- Arrondissement: Versailles
- Canton: Saint-Cyr-l'École
- Intercommunality: CA Versailles Grand Parc

Government
  - Mayor (2020–2026): Richard Rivaud
- Area^{1}: 5.43 km^{2} (2.10 sq mi)
- Elevation: 120 m (390 ft)
- Highest elevation: 176 m (577 ft)
- Lowest elevation: 92 m (302 ft)
- Population (2023): 13,680
  - Density: 2,520/km^{2} (6,530/sq mi)
- Time zone: UTC+01:00 (CET)
  - Summer (DST): UTC+02:00 (CEST)
- INSEE/Postal code: 78242 /78330
- ^{1} French Land Register data, which excludes lakes, ponds, glaciers > 1 km^{2} (0.386 sq mi or 247 acres) and river estuaries.

Fontenay-le-Fleury (French pronunciation: [fɔ̃tnɛ lə flœʁi]) is a commune in the Yvelines department in the Île-de-France in north-central France. It is located in the western suburbs of Paris, 28.7 kilometres (17.8 mi) from the center of the capital and adjacent to Versailles.

== Geography ==
The commune is situated in the Plaine de Versailles, a fertile agricultural plain. It is bordered by Saint-Cyr-l'École to the east, Bois-d'Arcy to the south, Villepreux to the west, and Rennemoulin to the north.

== History ==
The name "Fontenay" derives from the Latin Fontanetum, meaning "the place of springs," referring to the numerous water sources in the area that feed the Rue de Gally. In the 11th century, the village was a dependency of the Abbey of Saint-Germain-des-Prés.

Under the reign of Louis XIV, the village became part of the Royal Domain of the Palace of Versailles. The king's influence is still visible in the architecture of the "Plaine de Gally." During the early 20th century, Fontenay's proximity to the Saint-Cyr-l'École air base linked it to the birth of French aviation, as pioneers like Alberto Santos-Dumont and Henri Farman performed maneuvers over the surrounding fields.

== Transport ==
The commune is served by the Fontenay-le-Fleury station on the Transilien Paris-Montparnasse line (Line N), providing direct access to Gare Montparnasse in approximately 30 minutes. It is also connected to the local bus network of the Communauté d'agglomération Versailles Grand Parc.

== Population ==
Historical population
Year	Pop.	±% p.a.
1968	12,035	—
1975	14,279	+2.47%
1982	12,874	−1.47%
1990	13,196	+0.31%
1999	12,582	−0.53%
2007	12,974	+0.38%
2012	12,823	−0.23%
2017	13,503	+1.04%
2023	13,680	+0.22%
Source: INSEE

== Main Sights ==
- Church of Saint-Germain: A 16th-century church built on the foundations of an 11th-century structure.
- Le Levant Cultural Center: The town's primary venue for arts and theater.
- Plaine de Gally: A vast natural and agricultural space shared with the Palace of Versailles.

== See also ==
- Communes of the Yvelines department
