= Jouy-en-Josas =

- Commune
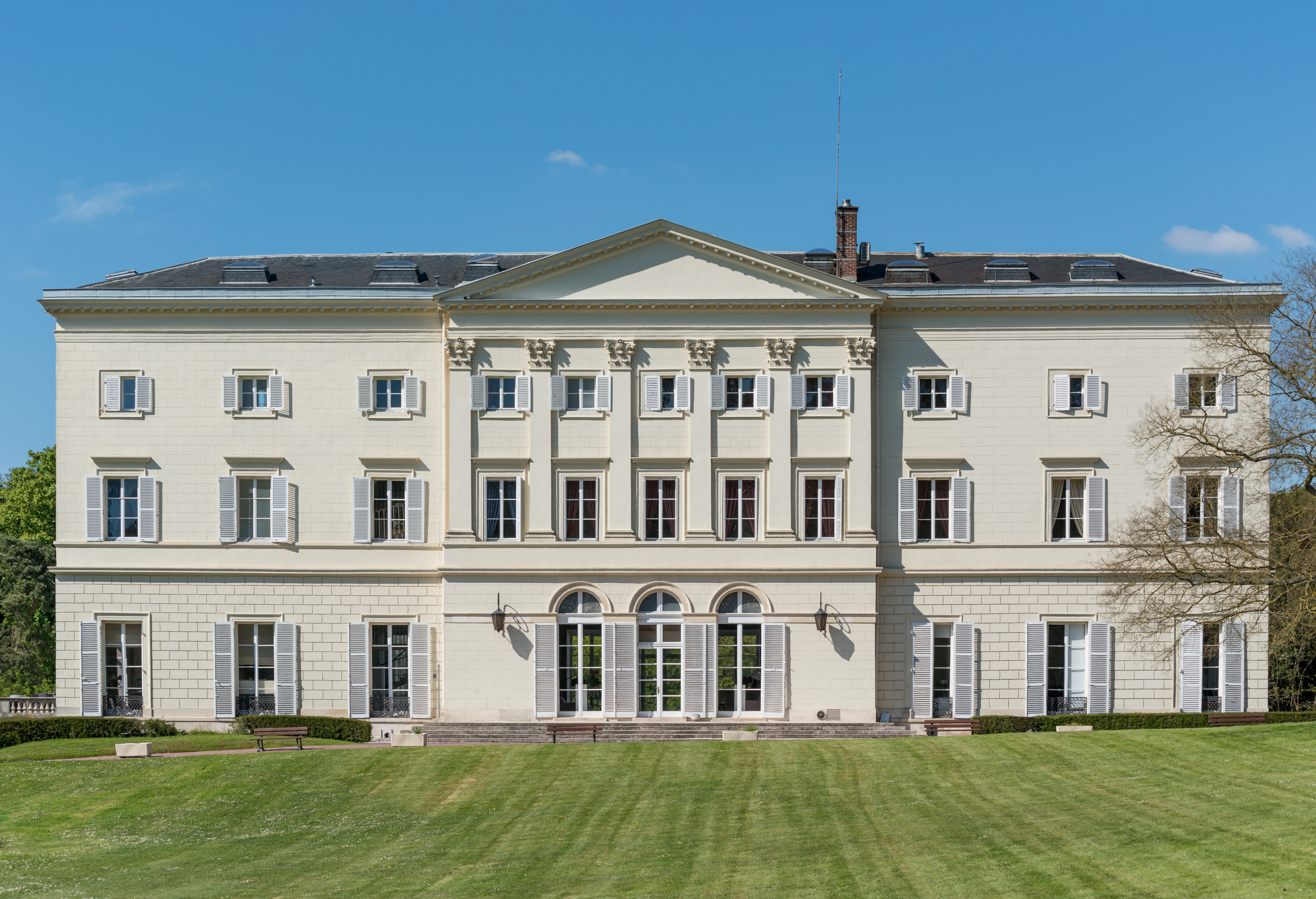
- Château de Jouy on the HEC Paris campus

- Coat of arms

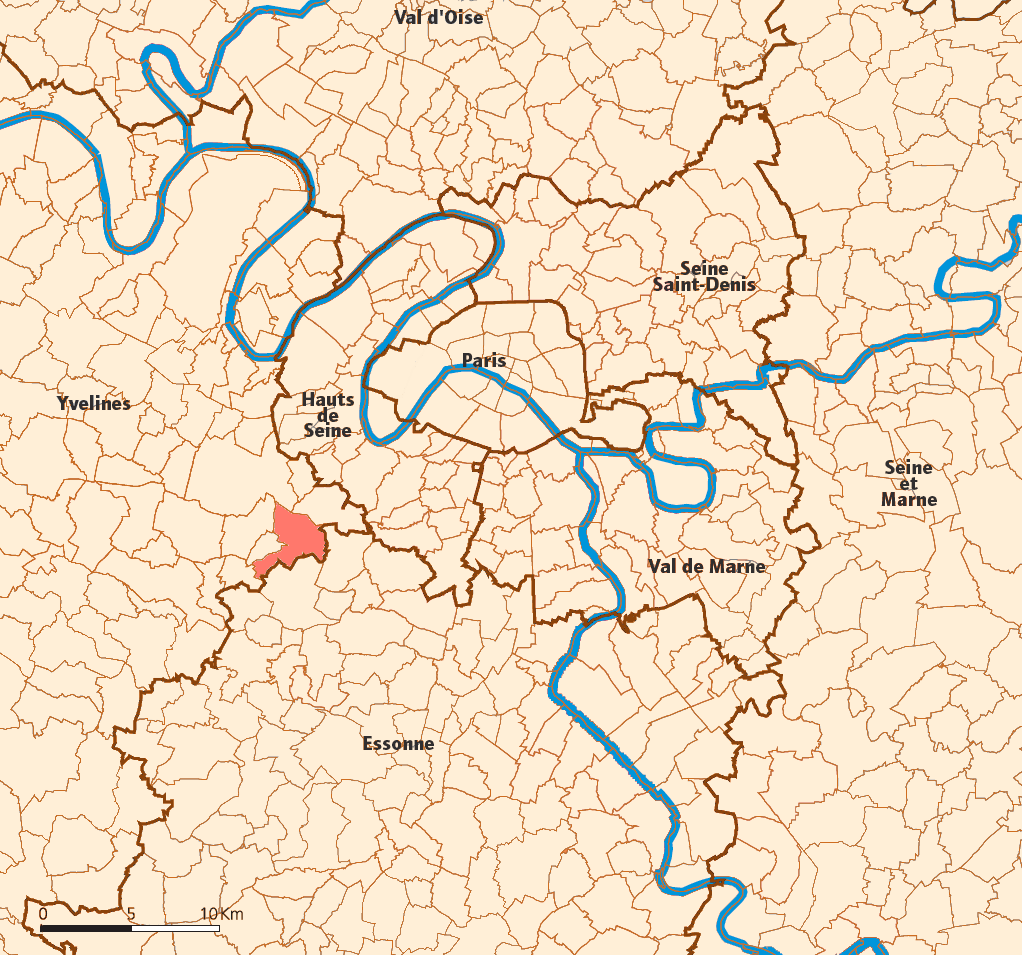
- Location (in red) within Paris inner and outer suburbs
- Location of Jouy-en-Josas
- Location within France Location within Île-de-France (region)
- Coordinates: 48°46′08″N 2°10′04″E
- Country: France
- Region: Île-de-France
- Department: Yvelines
- Arrondissement: Versailles
- Canton: Versailles-2
- Intercommunality: CA Versailles Grand Parc

Government
  - Mayor (2020–2026): Marie-Hélène Aubert
- Area^{1}: 10.14 km^{2} (3.92 sq mi)
- Elevation: 90 m (300 ft)
- Highest elevation: 179 m (587 ft)
- Lowest elevation: 77 m (253 ft)
- Population (2023): 7,981
  - Density: 787.1/km^{2} (2,039/sq mi)
- Time zone: UTC+01:00 (CET)
  - Summer (DST): UTC+02:00 (CEST)
- INSEE/Postal code: 78322 /78350
- ^{1} French Land Register data, which excludes lakes, ponds, glaciers > 1 km^{2} (0.386 sq mi or 247 acres) and river estuaries.

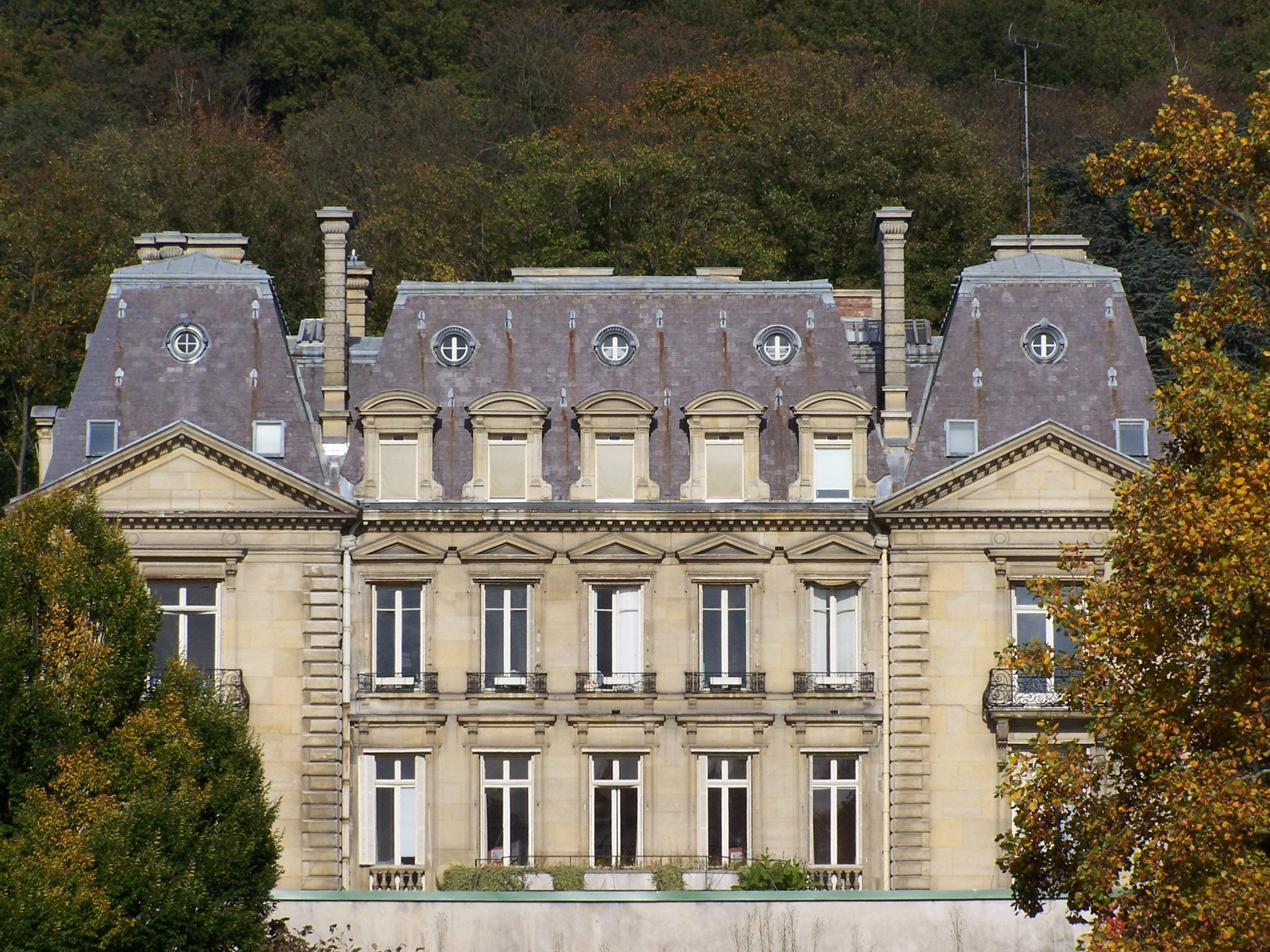
Chateau of Vilvert

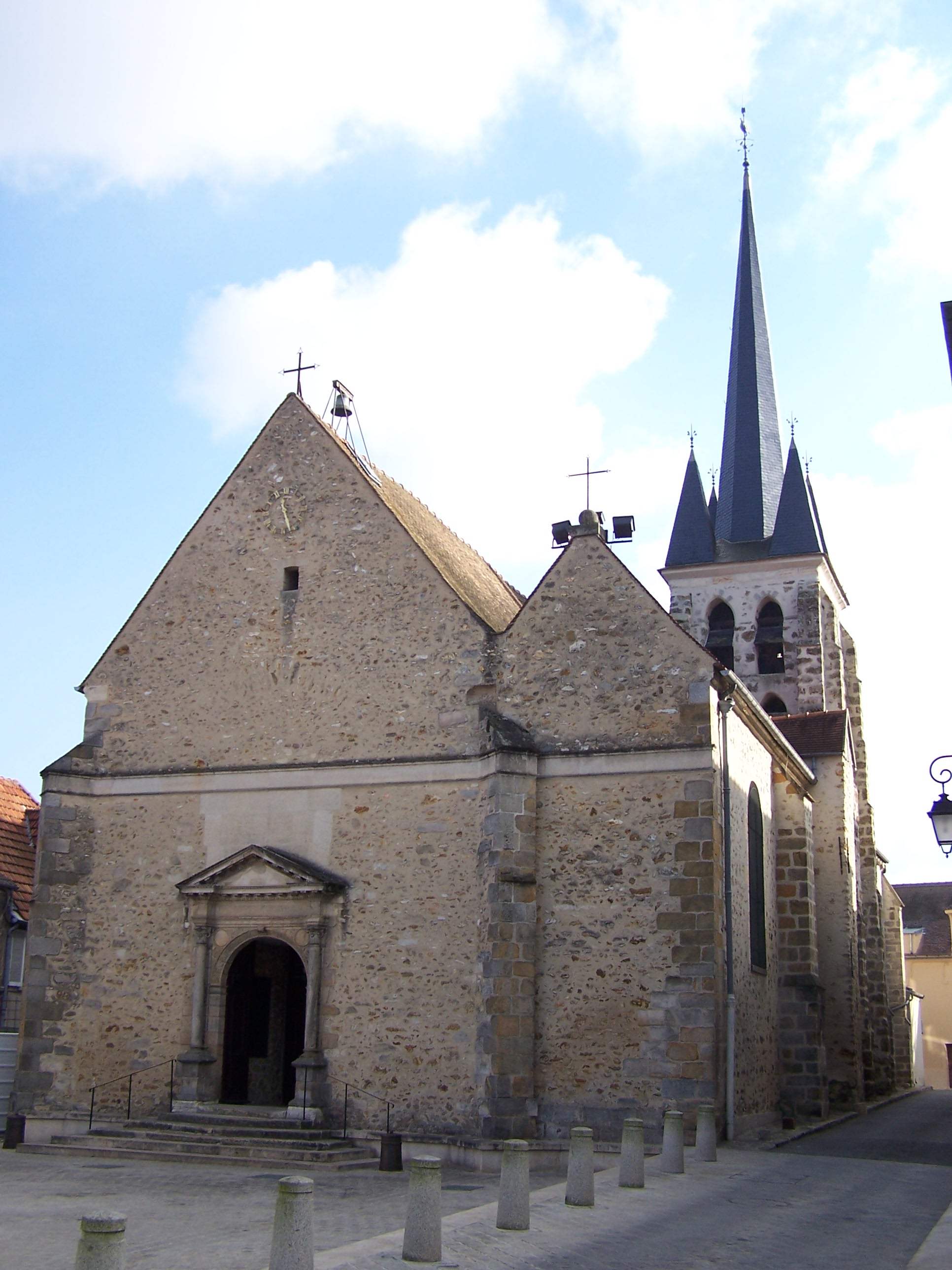
Church of St-Martin

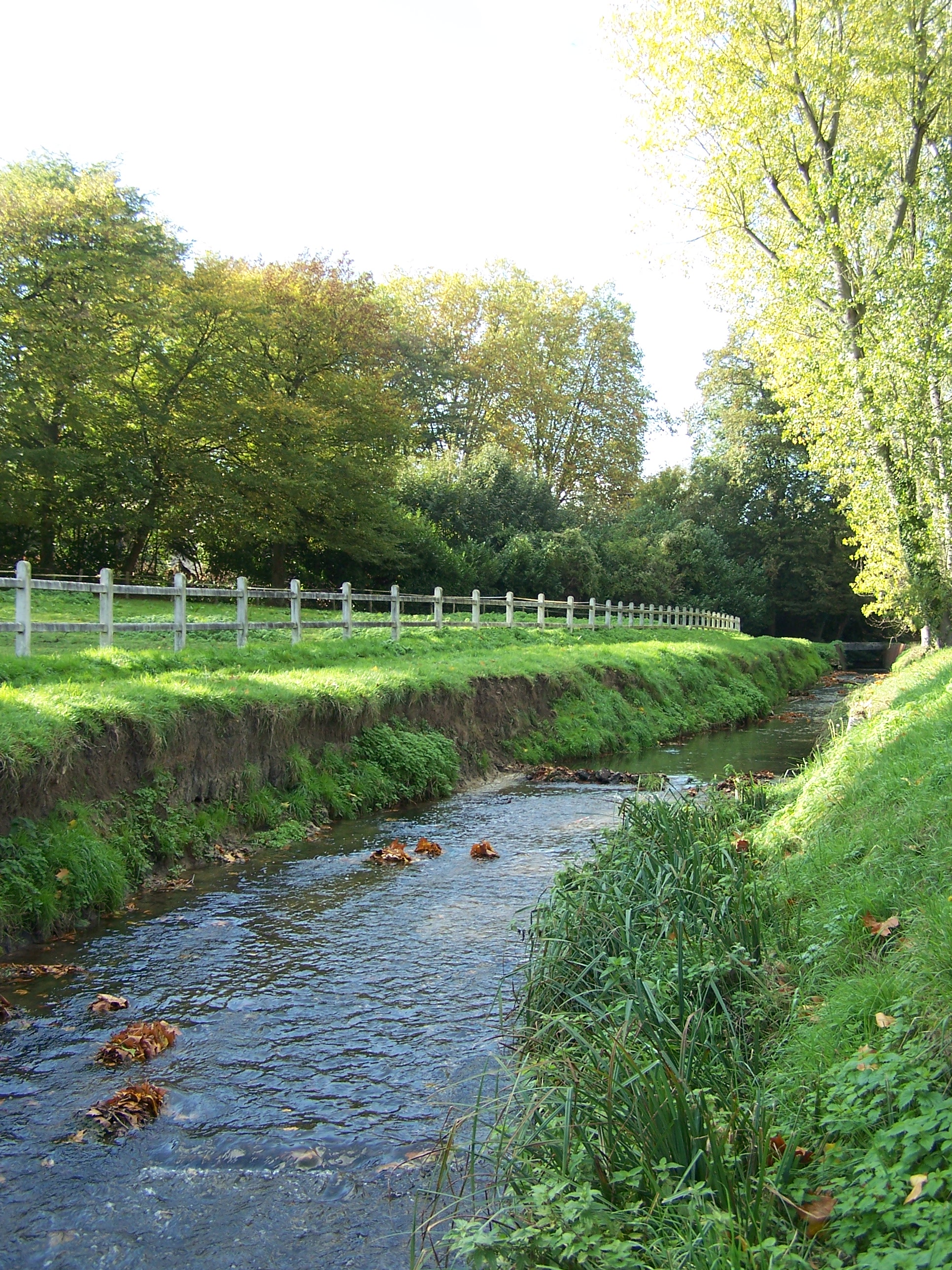
The river Bièvre passing through Jouy

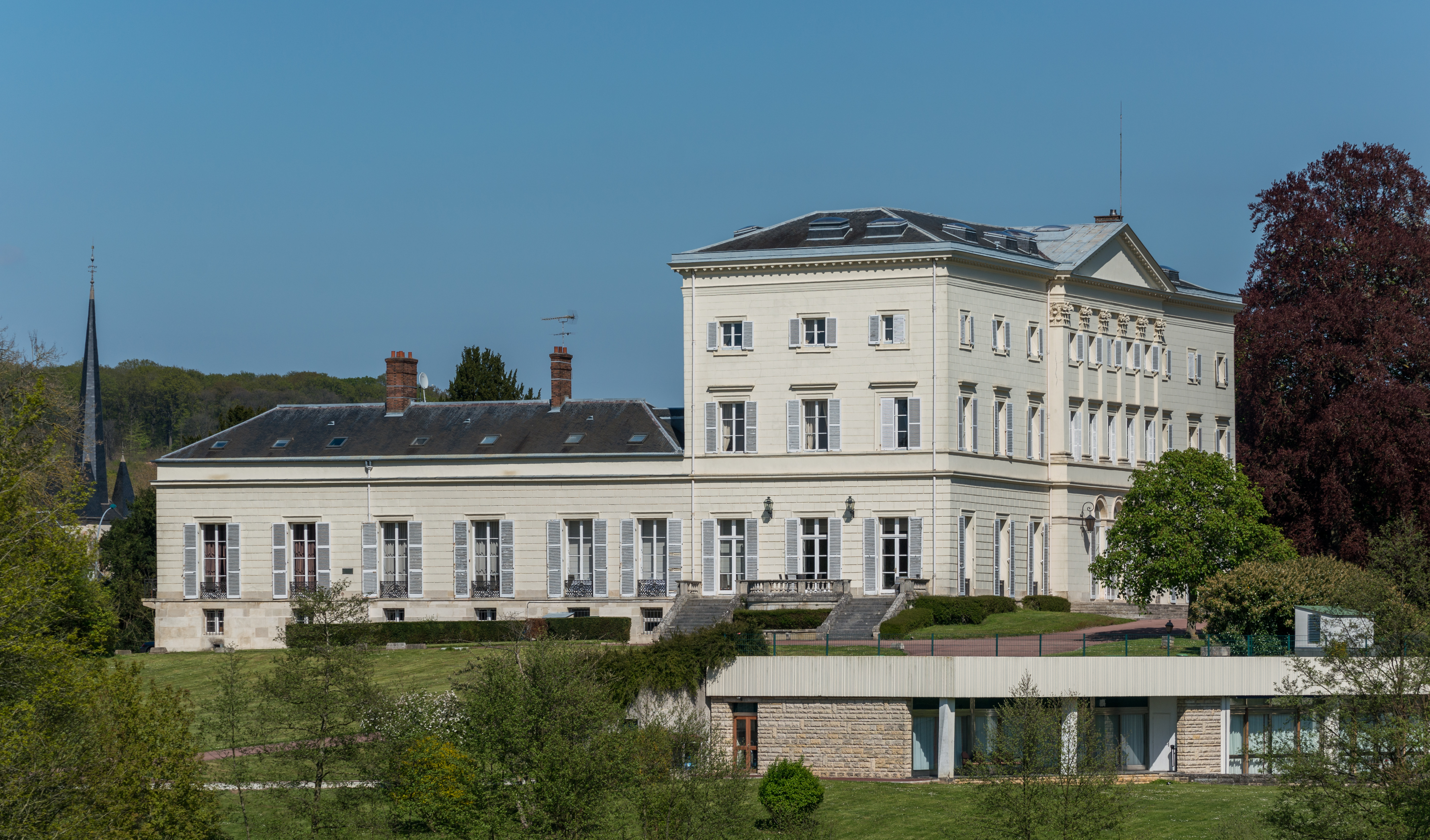
Château de Jouy, now owned by HEC Paris

Jouy-en-Josas (French pronunciation: [ʒwi ɑ̃ ʒozas]) is a commune in the Yvelines department in the Île-de-France region in Northern France. It is located in the southwestern outer suburbs of Paris, 16.4 km (10.2 mi) from the centre of Paris, on the departmental border with Essonne.

Jouy-en-Josas is home to the main campus of HEC School of Management (HEC Paris).

A portion of the Vélizy-Villacoublay Air Base is in this commune.

== Geography ==
Jouy-en-Josas is four kilometres to the south-east of Versailles, and 19 km to the south-west of Paris, in the middle of the valley of the Bièvre river. A town with nearly eight thousand inhabitants, half of Jouy-en-Josas is covered by forest.

The communes that surround Jouy-en-Josas are Vélizy-Villacoublay, to the north-east, Bièvres to the east, Saclay to the south, Toussus-le-Noble to the extreme south-west, Les Loges-en-Josas to the west, Buc to the north-west and Versailles to the north-north-west.

== History ==
Jouy is a direct translation of Latin gaudium, both meaning "joy". Josas was the ancient name of an archidiaconate of the archbishop of Paris. Although many discoveries in various parts of the town attest to there once having been a Gallo-Roman presence there, the first traces of the construction of a village are of the ninth century. Stimulated by the presence of monks from the abbey of Saint-Germain-des-Prés in Paris, Jouy grew rapidly, but the population was progressively annihilated in the fourteenth century by a number of wars and epidemics. By 1466, there were only three houses left in the village.

From that date forward, Jouy became home to several aristocratic families. A number of seigneurs from Jouy had close relations with the kings: Antoine d'Aquin was the personal doctor to Louis XIV, and his grandson, Antoine-Louis de Rouillé, became Secretary of State of the Navy and Foreign Affairs under Louis XV.

In 1759, Christophe-Philippe Oberkampf, an entrepreneur of German origins, moved to Jouy-en-Josas and started a factory there, which produced toile de Jouy, a cotton fabric printed with isolated engraved vignettes of historical figures or landscapes, usually printed in red or green on white cotton. He became the town's first mayor in 1790. Industry started to wane in 1799 and even further in 1815, when Napoleon was toppled and Oberkampf died. Oberkampf's motto, "Recte et Viligenter", Latin for "Uprightness and Vigilance", was used by the commune for its coat of arms.

The Cartier Foundation for Contemporary Art settled in Jouy-en-Josas for a short time, before moving to the Boulevard Raspail in Paris. Jouy is also the home of the HEC School of Management, one of the renowned grandes écoles, which moved there from Paris in 1964.

== Main sights ==
- The Roman Catholic Church of St Martin is a landmark of the town, characterized by its bell-tower. The oldest parts of the present church date back to the thirteenth century. Inside, one can admire many interesting statues and sculptures, out of which, a statue of the Virgin Mary is most prominent. The Church also preserves a painting of Jesus from the nineteenth century, by the little-known painter Félix Hullin de Boischevalier (1808-89.)
- The tomb of Christophe-Philippe Oberkampf
- The Chateau de l'Églantine, built by Maréchal Canrobert, is now a museum concerning toile de Jouy and its history.
- The Château de Vilvert, built for Baron Cabrol de Monté, the mayor of Jouy from 1868 to 1879.
- The house of Léon Blum and his cousin and third wife, Jeanne, who settled in Jouy after the Second World War. The house, called the Clos des Metz, has an office and library preserved just as Leon Blum had them.

== Demographics ==
Inhabitants are called Jovaciens in French.

Historical population

Year	Pop.	±% p.a.
1793	1,716	—
1800	1,673	−0.36%
1806	1,833	+1.53%
1821	1,350	−2.02%
1831	1,244	−0.81%
1836	1,338	+1.47%
1841	1,415	+1.13%
1846	1,127	−4.45%
1851	1,136	+0.16%
1856	1,226	+1.54%
1861	1,384	+2.45%
1866	1,387	+0.04%
1872	1,322	−0.80%
1876	1,463	+2.57%
1881	1,316	−2.10%
1886	1,360	+0.66%
1891	1,358	−0.03%
1896	1,485	+1.80%
1901	1,513	+0.37%

Year	Pop.	±% p.a.
1906	1,410	−1.40%
1911	1,387	−0.33%
1921	1,541	+1.06%
1926	1,669	+1.61%
1931	2,029	+3.98%
1936	2,246	+2.05%
1946	2,538	+1.23%
1954	3,321	+3.42%
1962	4,143	+2.80%
1968	5,443	+4.65%
1975	7,176	+4.03%
1982	7,616	+0.85%
1990	7,639	+0.04%
1999	7,896	+0.37%
2007	8,030	+0.21%
2012	8,199	+0.42%
2017	8,140	−0.14%
2023	7,981	−0.33%

Source: EHESS and INSEE (1968–2023)

== Economy ==
Jouy-en-Josas has a very low unemployment rate. According to data from 1999, the rate of unemployment in Jouy was only 5.4%, compared to a national rate of 12.9%. The income of an average Jovacian is twice as high as the national average: the average Jovacian earns around €43,934 per year, compared to the French average of €20,363. 41 companies were established in Jouy-en-Josas in 2004 alone. The town is estimated to have around 400 businesses in all sectors of the economy. The town is home to both traditionally French small businesses and to artisans. The area around Petit Robinson has also attracted many tertiary industries.

Jouy-en-Josas is home to a number of notable higher education and research centres, such as HEC School of Management, the CRC (Centre for Managerial Research and Studies), and the INRA (National Institute for Agronomic Research.)

== Transport ==
Jouy-en-Josas is served by two stations on Paris RER Line C: Vauboyen and Jouy-en-Josas.

== Education ==
Preschools include Ecole maternelle Bourget-Calmette, Ecole maternelle Jacques Toutain, and Ecole maternelle du Parc de Diane. Elementary schools include Ecole élémentaire Bourget-Calmette, Ecole élémentaire Emile Mousseau, and Ecole élémentaire du Parc de Diane.

Students in the attendance zones of Bourget-Calmette and Emile Mousseau are zoned to Collège Maryse Bastié in Vélizy-Villacoublay. Those zoned to Parc de Diane are zoned to Collège St-Exupéry, also in Vélizy-Villacoublay.

Students go to Versailles for standard public high schools.

Area international secondary schools include Lycée Franco-Allemand in Buc, which has instruction in German, and Collège Martin Luther King, a junior high school which has instruction in English. Collège Pierre de Nolhac is in Versailles.

Area private schools include Institut Saint-Thomas de Villeneuve (elementary through high school) in Chaville, Collège privé du Sacré-Coeur in Versailles, Lycée Saint-Nicolas in Igny, Essonne, and Lycée privé Notre-Dame-du-Grandchamp in Versailles.

== Twin towns ==
- Meckesheim, Germany
- Bothwell, Scotland
- Gif-sur-Yvette, France

== People ==
- Arman, a French-American artist, has realized an enormous sculpture called "Long Term Parking" in the park of Chateau Montcel
- Jane Avril (1868–1943) lived in the centre of town.
- Léon Blum and his wife, Jeanne, moved to the town in 1950. In 1974, Jeanne founded a school here.
- Booba, a French rapper who previously lived in Vélizy-Villacoublay, now lives in Jouy.
- Albert Calmette (1861–1933) lived in a house called the Garenne des Metz.
- Maréchal Canrobert, a general of Louis-Napoléon Bonaparte, had a château built there, which now serves as a museum concerning toile de Jouy.
- The journalist and TV personality Anne Depétrini lives in the Jocavian heights.
- The painter Arthur Chaplin was born in Jouy in 1869.
- In 1834, Victor Hugo rented a small house in Metz, specifically for liaisons with his love interest, Juliette Drouet.
- The TV presenter Vincent Lagaf' has a house in Jouy.
- Daisuke Matsui, a footballer from Le Mans, often spends the weekends in Jouy-en-Josas.
- Patrick Modiano, born in 1945, spent his childhood in Jouy.
- Ramzy, from the comedic duo, Éric and Ramzy, is an inhabitant.
- Elsa Zylberstein, an actress, grew up in Jouy.

== Popular culture ==
- The French chanteur, Christophe, who lives in the nearby Juvisy-sur-Orge, is said to have written the words to his famous song, "Aline", in the café-restaurant Le Robin des Bois, across from the Jouy rail station.
- Edgar P. Jacobs, author of the Blake and Mortimer books, located part of the action of his book, S.O.S Meteors (1958), in the Bièvre Valley, notably in Jouy, Buc and Les Loges-en-Josas.
- In July 1990, The Velvet Underground played in Jouy, which was their first concert with Lou Reed since August 1970.

== See also ==
- Communes of the Yvelines department
