= Arrondissement of Versailles =

Coordinates: 48°47′59″N 2°07′52″E

Versailles
- Arrondissement
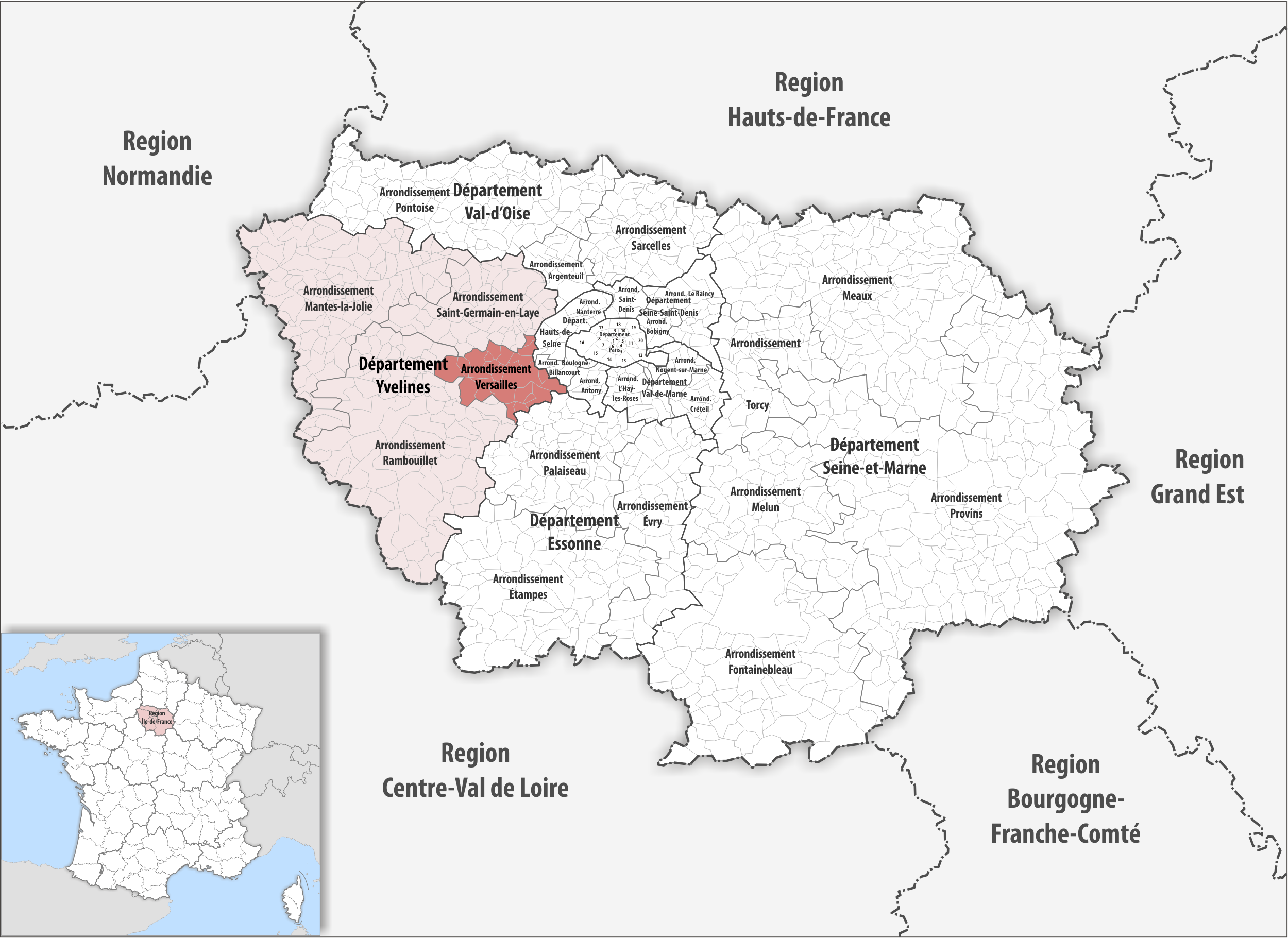
- Location within the region Île-de-France
- Country: France
- Region: Île-de-France
- Department: Yvelines
- No. of communes: {{{nbcomm}}}
- Area: 187.2 km^{2} (72.3 sq mi)
- Population (2023): 423,376
  - Density: 2,262/km^{2} (5,858/sq mi)
- INSEE code: 784

The arrondissement of Versailles is an arrondissement of France in the Yvelines department in the Île-de-France region. It has 23 communes. Its population is 417,771 (2021), and its area is 187.2 km^{2} (72.3 sq mi).

== Composition ==
The communes of the arrondissement of Versailles, and their INSEE codes, are:

1. Bailly (78043)
2. Bois-d'Arcy (78073)
3. Bougival (78092)
4. Buc (78117)
5. La Celle-Saint-Cloud (78126)
6. Châteaufort (78143)
7. Le Chesnay-Rocquencourt (78158)
8. Les Clayes-sous-Bois (78165)
9. Fontenay-le-Fleury (78242)
10. Guyancourt (78297)
11. Jouy-en-Josas (78322)
12. Les Loges-en-Josas (78343)
13. Montigny-le-Bretonneux (78423)
14. Noisy-le-Roi (78455)
15. Plaisir (78490)
16. Rennemoulin (78518)
17. Saint-Cyr-l'École (78545)
18. Toussus-le-Noble (78620)
19. Trappes (78621)
20. Vélizy-Villacoublay (78640)
21. Versailles (78646)
22. Villepreux (78674)
23. Viroflay (78686)

== History ==
The arrondissement of Versailles was created in 1800 as part of the department Seine-et-Oise. In 1968 it became part of the new department Yvelines. At the January 2017 reorganisation of the arrondissements of Seine-et-Marne, it received six communes from the arrondissement of Saint-Germain-en-Laye, and it lost one commune to the arrondissement of Rambouillet.

As a result of the reorganisation of the cantons of France which came into effect in 2015, the borders of the cantons are no longer related to the borders of the arrondissements. The cantons of the arrondissement of Mantes were, as of January 2015:

1. Le Chesnay
2. Montigny-le-Bretonneux
3. Plaisir
4. Saint-Cyr-l'École
5. Trappes
6. Vélizy-Villacoublay
7. Versailles-Nord
8. Versailles-Nord-Ouest
9. Versailles-Sud
10. Viroflay
