= Buc, Yvelines =

Buc
- Commune
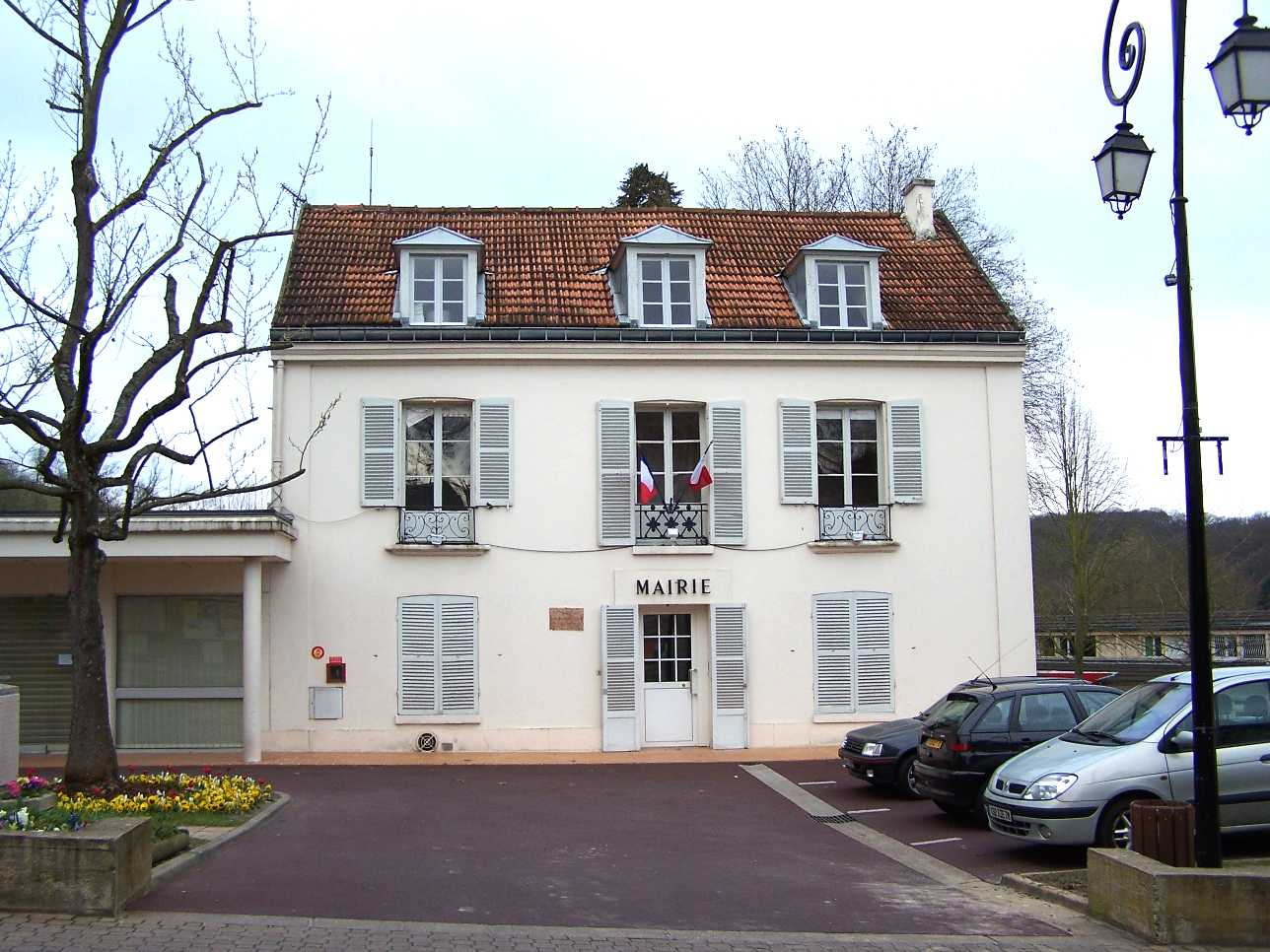
- Town hall

- Coat of arms
- Location of Buc
- Location within France Location within Île-de-France (region)
- Coordinates: 48°46′27″N 2°07′34″E
- Country: France
- Region: Île-de-France
- Department: Yvelines
- Arrondissement: Versailles
- Canton: Versailles-2
- Intercommunality: CA Versailles Grand Parc

Government
  - Mayor (2020–2026): Stéphane Grasset
- Area^{1}: 8.07 km^{2} (3.12 sq mi)
- Elevation: 106 m (348 ft)
- Highest elevation: 176 m (577 ft)
- Lowest elevation: 97 m (318 ft)
- Population (2023): 5,816
  - Density: 721/km^{2} (1,870/sq mi)
- Time zone: UTC+01:00 (CET)
  - Summer (DST): UTC+02:00 (CEST)
- INSEE/Postal code: 78117 /78530
- ^{1} French Land Register data, which excludes lakes, ponds, glaciers > 1 km^{2} (0.386 sq mi or 247 acres) and river estuaries.

Buc (French pronunciation: [byk]) is a commune in the Yvelines department and Île-de-France region of north central France.

== Geography ==
Buc is located some 20 km south-west of central Paris and 3 km south of Versailles.

The old town lies in the valley of the River Bièvre at an elevation of around 100 m above sea level. Most of Buc's residential districts have been built on the plateau de Saclay, some 50 m higher.

The surrounding communes are:

- Versailles to the north
- Jouy-en-Josas to the north-east
- Les Loges-en-Josas to the south-east
- Toussus-le-Noble to the south
- Châteaufort to the extreme south-west
- Guyancourt to the west.

== Demography ==
Historical population

Year	Pop.	±% p.a.
1793	618	—
1800	644	+0.59%
1806	524	−3.38%
1821	577	+0.64%
1831	610	+0.56%
1836	625	+0.49%
1841	567	−1.93%
1846	576	+0.32%
1851	526	−1.80%
1856	548	+0.82%
1861	297	−11.53%
1866	532	+12.36%
1872	543	+0.34%
1876	709	+6.90%
1881	685	−0.69%
1886	764	+2.21%
1891	730	−0.91%
1896	737	+0.19%
1901	744	+0.19%

Year	Pop.	±% p.a.
1906	703	−1.13%
1911	867	+4.28%
1921	1,002	+1.46%
1926	1,157	+2.92%
1931	1,420	+4.18%
1936	1,293	−1.86%
1946	1,098	−1.62%
1954	1,483	+3.83%
1962	1,965	+3.58%
1968	2,655	+5.14%
1975	3,908	+5.68%
1982	4,820	+3.04%
1990	5,434	+1.51%
1999	5,764	+0.66%
2007	5,455	−0.69%
2012	5,462	+0.03%
2017	5,821	+1.28%
2023	5,816	−0.01%

Source: EHESS and INSEE

== History ==
The name Buc derives from the Latin buscum which means boxwood. The inhabitants of Buc are known in French as Bucois (m.) and Bucoises (f.).

Buc's coat of arms: quarterly, the first azure a propeller in bend between a fleur-de-lis sinister and a horseshoe dexter all or, the second gules a cinquefoil vert, the third gules an aqueduct of four arches argent masoned sable, the fourth argent three bars wavy azure

- Territory attached to the domain of Versailles in 1660 and used to be frequented by King Louis XIV, mostly for hunting.
- 1684-1686 : Construction of the Buc aqueduct.
- 1880 : Construction of the Fort du Haut-Buc.
- 1909, July 25 : Installation of Louis Blériot on 200 hectares (494 acres); he built his private airfield and, in 1913, a flying school.

== Culture ==
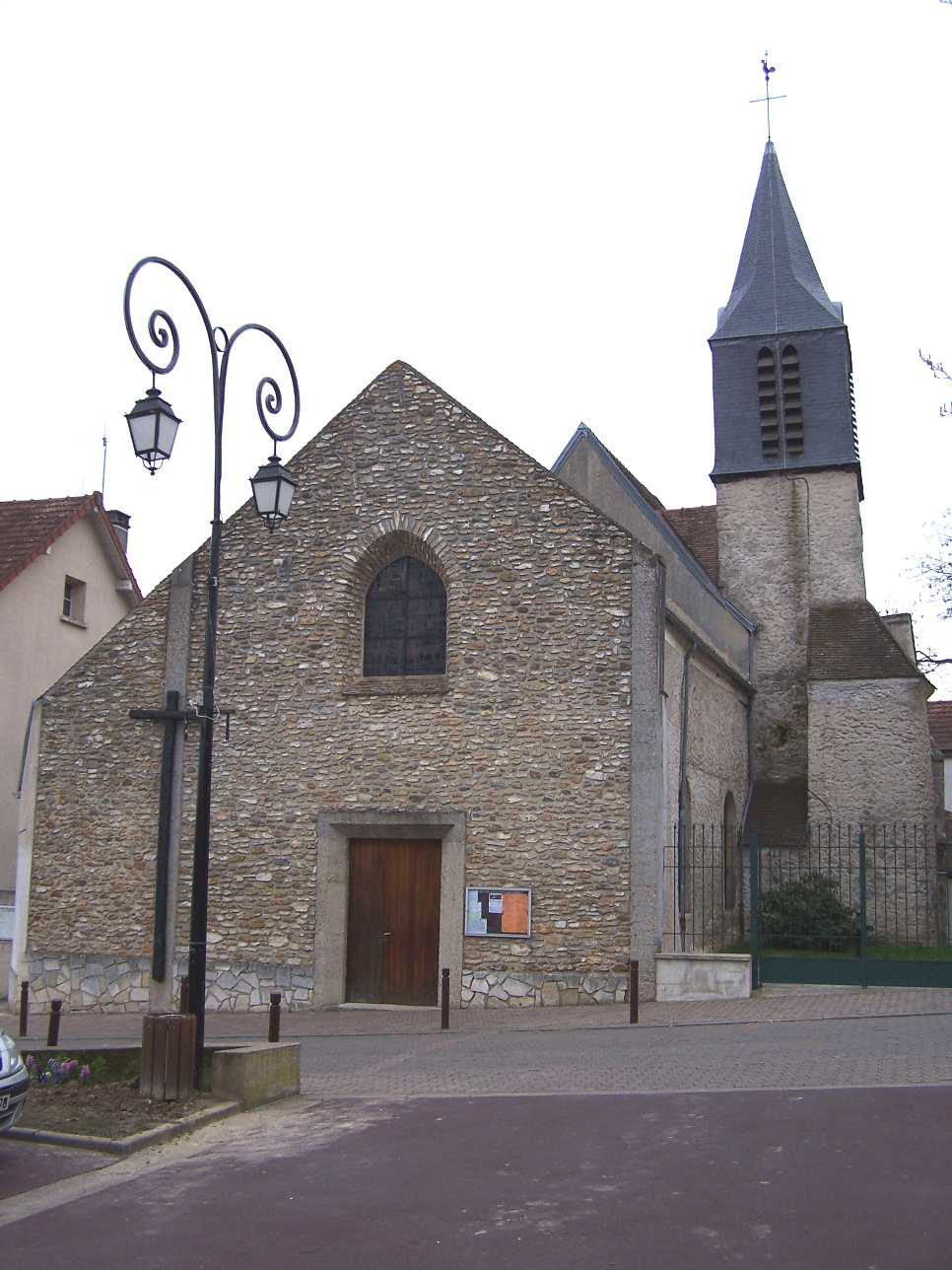
Church of St John the Baptist

- Saint-Jean-Baptiste Church : Built in siliceous rock from the 12th century, enlarged in 1994. The nave has a gothic architectural shape and its bell tower has a romanesque style. In the steeple, the bell, which is classified Monument historique, has been melted, blessed and then baptized Louise Auguste Adélaïde by its sponsor Louis XIV in 1775.
- Aqueduc de Buc : Built by François Michel Le Tellier de Louvois in 1686. This aqueduct purpose was to provide water drained from the Ponds of Saclay (more precisely, ponds of Saclé, Pont Salé and Saint-Hubert by the time it was used) and delivered to the Domain of the Palace of Versailles, known as well as the Gardens of Versailles, in order to supply huge amounts of water to its multitude of fountains and basins. The aqueduct has 19 millstone arches, is 21 meters high and 580 meters long. Now disused, this great architectural work has been classified Monument historique in 1952.
- Château du Haut-Buc : This ancient little castle was part of the Grand parc de Versailles (Great Versailles Domain) and was used by Louis XIV to accommodate his son Louis-Alexandre de Bourbon, comte de Toulouse (1681), duc de Penthièvre (1697), d'Arc, de Châteauvillain and de Rambouillet (1711) which later moved into the Pavillon des Eaux at Louveciennes. Le Château du Haut-Buc was destroyed in 1740 on order of Louis XV. The actual castle, the commune property, was rebuilt on the same site in 1864. Today the castle is often used as a showroom as well as a music school. Its park has a playground and a soccer, rugby and basketball pitch .
- Fort du Haut-Buc : Made between 1814 and 1880, this fortification used to be part of the second fortified defence belt of Paris between 1874 and 1882. This military building is currently unaffected and is completely abandoned since 1995.
- Near the aqueduct and the Pond of La Geneste (part of the ponds of La Minière), the Oak of Louis XIV, which is probably more than 500 years old, survived a great storm which occurred in 1999, devastating much of the forest. Unfortunately this emblematic tree collapsed from age in the last week of 2004. Buc's forest is part of the Forêt de Versailles (Versailles forest).
- Buc local legend : Some people assert that beavers can be observed in La Bièvre whereas nothing really proves the presence of such inhabitants. This river get its name from the Latin word biber which means beaver, which explains the legend. But other roots can be found like beber (meaning "brown"), which could describe the natural color of the water, or bibere (to drink), which is more than enjoyable on the evening, facing the pond of La Geneste in a peaceful atmosphere with some friends and a good pack of Kronenbourgs. And surprisingly, it is at those moments that beavers are more likely to appear.
- A cartoon festival, the Festival de Buc, is held each year since 1994. The comic book of one of the adventures of Blake and Mortimer, S.O.S. Meteors: Mortimer in Paris (1959) of Edgar P. Jacobs, has its story based in and around Buc.
- Buc is the home of one of the three Franco-German high schools and the only one located in France. Franco-German Baccalauréats are issued.

== Administration ==
In 2005, the commune has been rewarded « Ville Internet @@ » (« Internet city @@ ») as well as in 2008 and 2010. This reward is highly decorative under the Buc's entrance street sign.

== The department ==
The Yvelines department has been created in 1968. This one was subsequently part of the Seine-et-Oise department. Jehan Despert is considered as the "father" of the Yvelines. He is the one whom suggested to the president of the County Council of Seine-et-Oise of that time, Gaston Palewski, the name of this department at its creation, in reference to the ancient Yveline forest from which radiate most of the water streams that irrigate the department. The actual Foret de Rambouillet (Rambouillet forest) constituted its remains.

== Transport ==
Buc is not served by any station of the Paris Métro, RER, or suburban rail network. The closest stations to Buc are Versailles Chantiers and Petit Jouy–Les Loges. One bus line (Bus 262) links the city to Versailles. It takes 5–15 minutes (If you are located in the Bas-Buc) to 10–30 minutes (if you are located in the Haut-Buc) to reach Versailles Chantier station depending on the traffic. Many buses go through Buc: the 102, 103, 104, 6179, 6180, 6181, 6182, 6183, 6184, 117, 6177, 6160, 6161, 6162, 6163 and 6164.

== Economy ==
Around 250 businesses are located in Buc.

== Education ==
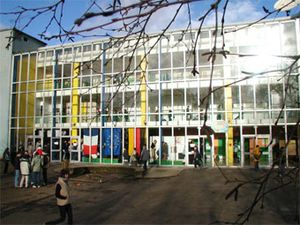
DFG / LFA Buc

Schools in Buc include:

- Ecole maternelle Pré St-Jean and Ecole élémentaire Pré St-Jean
- Ecole maternelle Louis Clément and Ecole élémentaire Louis Clément
- Ecole maternelle Louis Blériot and Ecole élémentaire Louis Blériot

The sole public junior high school is Collège Martin Luther King, named in honor of slain American civil rights leader Martin Luther King Jr.

DFG / LFA Buc, a joint French-German international school, is in Buc. It was established by the 1963 Élysée Treaty. Section Internationale Anglophone de Buc is a section of this school.

== Twin town ==
Buc is twinned with:

- Bad Schwalbach, Germany

== See also ==
- Communes of the Yvelines department
- François Bazin (sculptor) Sculpture on Buc airfield
