= Hôtel de Ville, Saint-Cyr-l'École =

Town hall in Saint-Cyr-l'École, France

Hôtel de Ville
- The main frontage of the Hôtel de Ville in July 2018
- Interactive map of the Hôtel de Ville area

General information
- Type: City hall
- Architectural style: Modern style
- Location: Saint-Cyr-l'École, France
- Coordinates: 48.7996°N 2.0671°E
- Completed: 1956

Design and construction
- Architect: Georges Servati

The Hôtel de Ville (French pronunciation: [otɛl də vil], City Hall) is a municipal building in Saint-Cyr-l'École, Yvelines, in the western suburbs of Paris, standing on Square de l'Hôtel-de-Ville.

== History ==
The old town hall

Following the French Revolution, the new council initially met in the home of the mayor at the time. This practice continued until 1844 when the council established a town hall on the south side of what is now Avenue Jean Jaurès. The site, which sloped steeply down towards the road, faced the Special Military Academy of Saint-Cyr. The new building was designed in the neoclassical style and was built in brick with a cement render finish. The design involved a symmetrical main frontage of five bays facing onto the street. The central bay featured a steep flight of steps leading up to a square-headed doorway; the building was fenestrated by casement windows with shutters.

On 25 July 1944, during the Second World War, allied aircraft bombed the airfield to the north of the town, which served as an operations base for the Luftwaffe, as well as the military academy and the railway marshalling yard and, in the process, destroyed many of the buildings in the town, including the town hall. After the war, the site was cleared and was later occupied by the Boutique Culturelle (cultural shop).

In the early 1950s, the council decided to commission a new town hall. The site they selected was immediately to the west of the old town hall. Construction of the new building commenced in 1954. It was designed by Georges Servati in the modern style, built in concrete and glass, with white stone cladding, and was completed in 1956.

The design involved an asymmetrical main frontage in two sections, with the right-hand section projected forward, facing west onto what is now Square de l'Hôtel-de-Ville. The left-hand section of eight bays was fenestrated by casement windows on all three floors, while the right-hand section was blind except for a glass door on the ground floor. Internally, the principal rooms were the Salle des Mariages (wedding room) and the Salle du Conseil (council chamber) on the first floor.

A bust of General Charles de Gaulle on a marble pedestal was unveiled in the garden in front of the town hall, facing the military academy where de Gaulle had trained, to celebrate the bicentenary of the founding of the college, on 8 May 2002. After a major programme of improvement works, involving a long single-storey glass foyer, an elevator for diabled people, and the refurbishment of the council chamber, had been carried out at a cost of €775,000, the building was officially reopened by the mayor, Bernard Debain, in November 2016.
