= Canton of Versailles-2 =

Coordinates: 48.80°N 2.13°E

The canton of Versailles-2 is an administrative division of the Yvelines department, northern France. It was created at the French canton reorganisation which came into effect in March 2015. Its seat is in Versailles.

It consists of the following communes:

1. Buc
2. Jouy-en-Josas
3. Les Loges-en-Josas
4. Vélizy-Villacoublay
5. Versailles (partly)
6. Viroflay
