= Communauté d'agglomération Versailles Grand Parc =

Coordinates: 48.80°N 2.13°E

Versailles Grand Parc
- Communauté d'agglomération
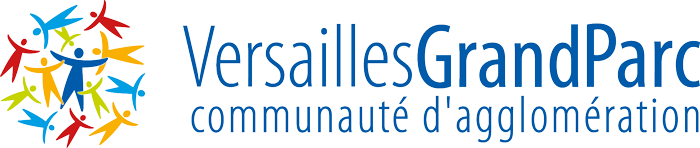

- Location within the Yvelines department, the commune of Bièvres, in Essonne is in violet
- Country: France
- Region: Île-de-France
- Department: Essonne, Yvelines
- No. of communes: {{{nbcomm}}}
- Established: 8 November 2002

Government
  - President: François de Mazières (DVD)
- Area: 123.6 km^{2} (47.7 sq mi)
- Population (2021): 267,857
  - Density: 2,167/km^{2} (5,613/sq mi)

The Communauté d'agglomération Versailles Grand Parc is the communauté d'agglomération, an intercommunal structure, centred on the city of Versailles. It is located in the Yvelines and Essonne departments, in the Île-de-France region, northern France. It was created in November 2002. Its area is 123.6 km^{2}. Its population was 267,857 in 2021, of which 83,587 in Versailles proper.

== Composition ==
The communauté d'agglomération consists of the following 18 communes, of which one (Bièvres) in the Essonne department:

1. Bailly
2. Bièvres
3. Bois-d'Arcy
4. Bougival
5. Buc
6. La Celle-Saint-Cloud
7. Châteaufort
8. Le Chesnay-Rocquencourt
9. Fontenay-le-Fleury
10. Jouy-en-Josas
11. Les Loges-en-Josas
12. Noisy-le-Roi
13. Rennemoulin
14. Saint-Cyr-l'École
15. Toussus-le-Noble
16. Vélizy-Villacoublay
17. Versailles
18. Viroflay
