= Bièvres, Essonne =

Commune in Île-de-France, France

Bièvres
- Commune
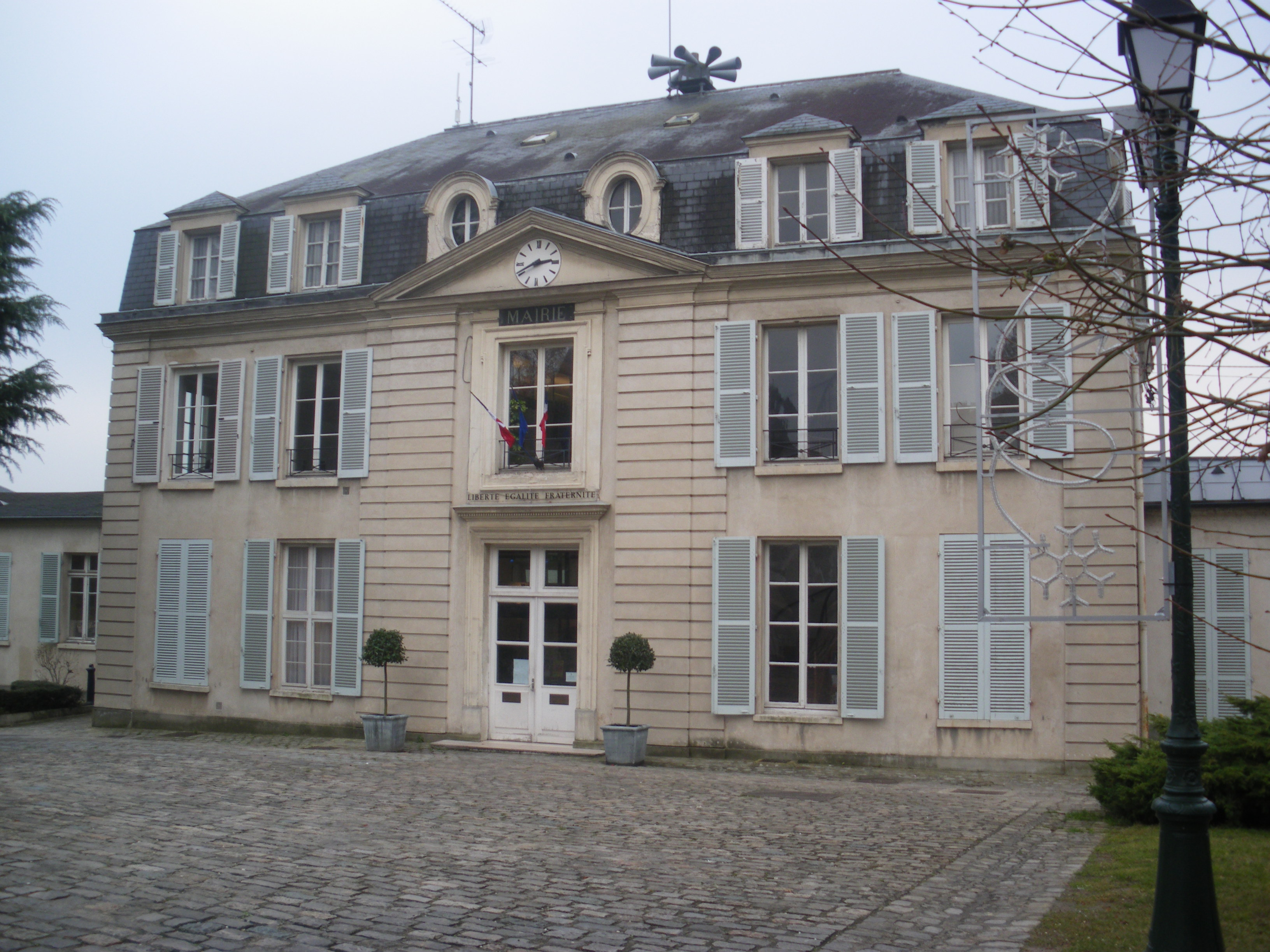
- The town hall

- Coat of arms
- Location of Bièvres
- Location within France Location within Île-de-France (region)
- Coordinates: 48°45′15″N 2°12′54″E
- Country: France
- Region: Île-de-France
- Department: Essonne
- Arrondissement: Palaiseau
- Canton: Gif-sur-Yvette
- Intercommunality: CA Versailles Grand Parc

Government
  - Mayor (2020–2026): Anne Pelletier-Le Barbier
- Area^{1}: 9.69 km^{2} (3.74 sq mi)
- Highest elevation: 178 m (584 ft)
- Lowest elevation: 67 m (220 ft)
- Population (2023): 4,686
  - Density: 484/km^{2} (1,250/sq mi)
- Time zone: UTC+01:00 (CET)
  - Summer (DST): UTC+02:00 (CEST)
- INSEE/Postal code: 91064 /91570
- ^{1} French Land Register data, which excludes lakes, ponds, glaciers > 1 km^{2} (0.386 sq mi or 247 acres) and river estuaries.

Bièvres (French pronunciation: [bjɛvʁ]) is a commune in the Essonne department and Île-de-France region of north-central France.

The commune derives its name from that of the River Bièvre which flows through the village. Bièvre is the old French word for a beaver (castor in modern French), so that the original meaning of the name of this stream is "beaver river".

A portion of the Vélizy-Villacoublay Air Base is in this commune.

== Population ==
Historical population
Year	Pop.	±% p.a.
1968	3,323	—
1975	4,133	+3.17%
1982	3,844	−1.03%
1990	4,209	+1.14%
1999	4,034	−0.47%
2007	4,982	+2.67%
2012	4,433	−2.31%
2017	4,639	+0.91%
2023	4,686	+0.17%
Source: INSEE

The inhabitants of Bièvres are known in French as les Bièvrois.

== Education ==
Primary schools include:

- L’école des Eaux-Vives
- L’école des Castors

Students at the junior high school level go to Collège Emile Zola in Igny. The senior high school/sixth form college for this commune is Lycée Parc de Vilgénis, located in Massy.

== See also ==
- Communes of the Essonne department

== Gallery ==
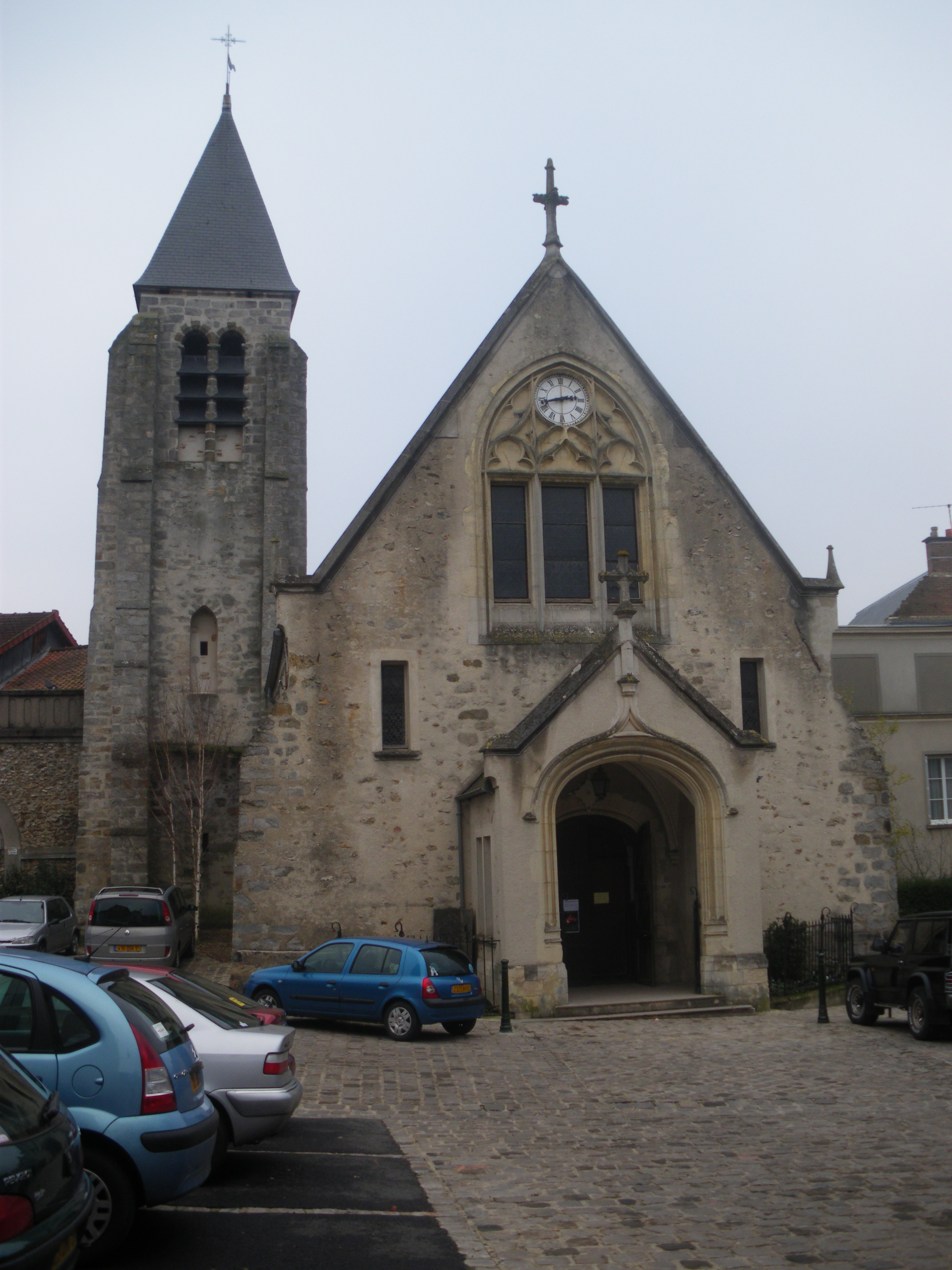
Saint Martin's church

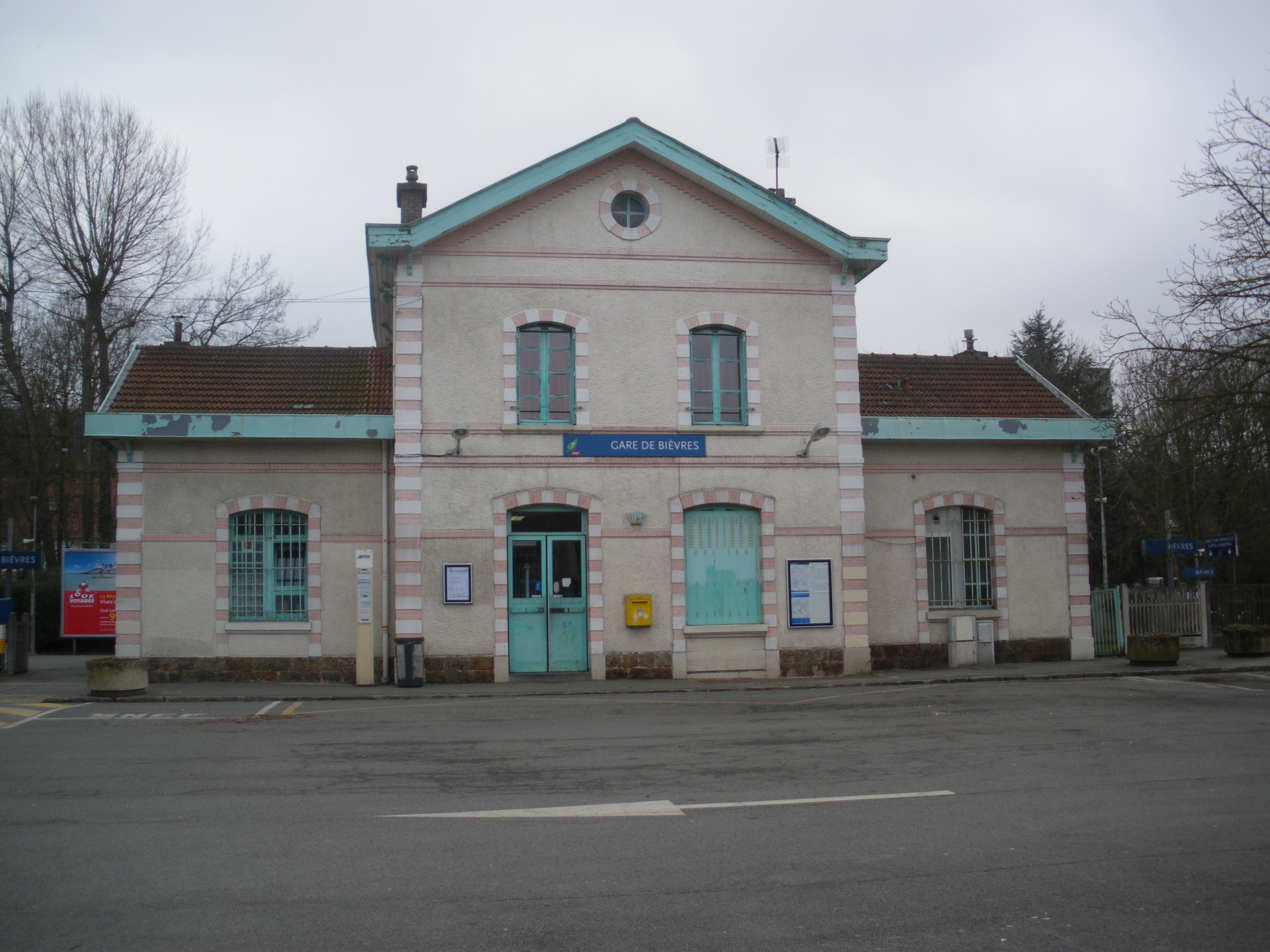
Bièvres railway station

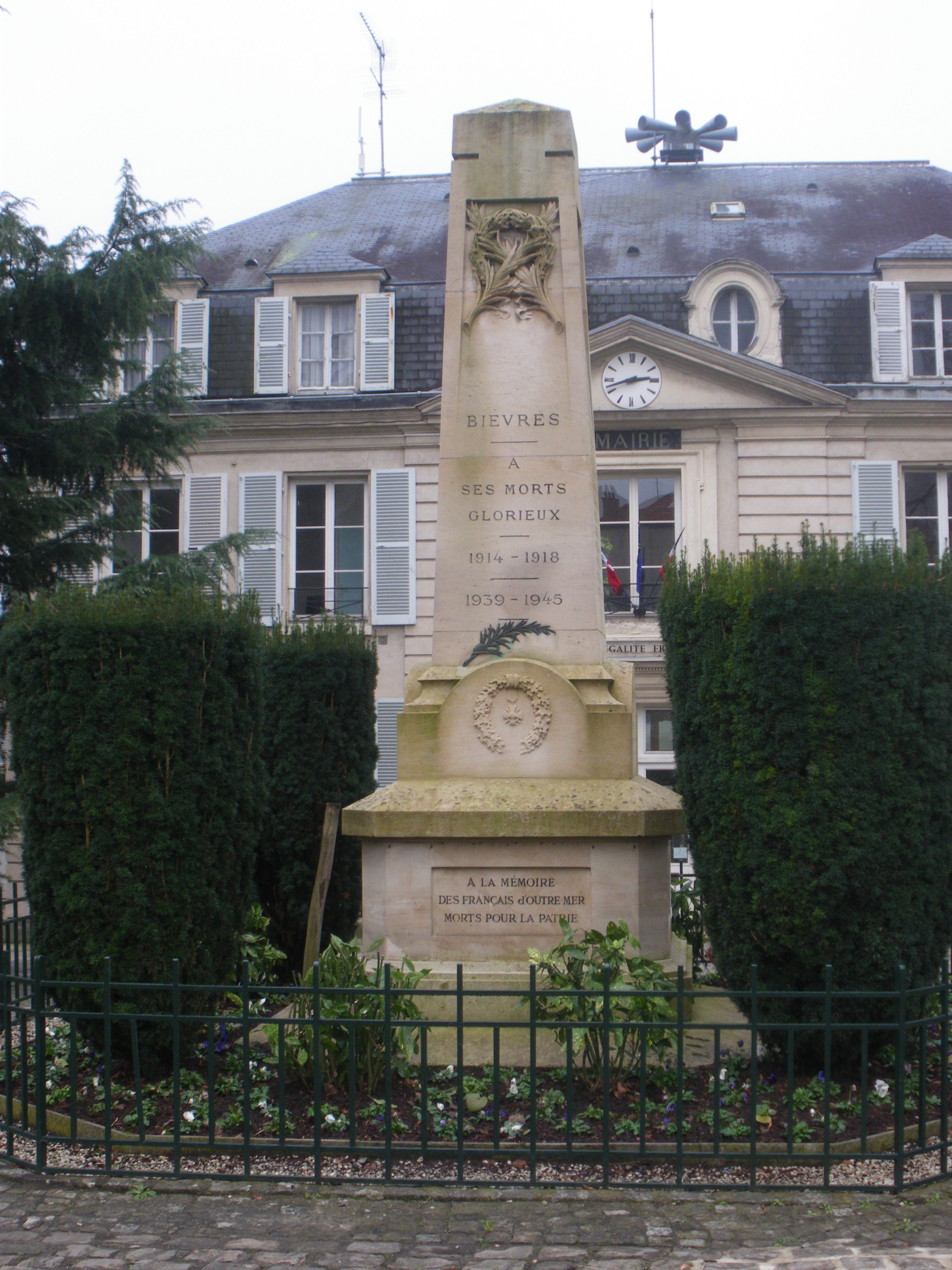
The War Memorial

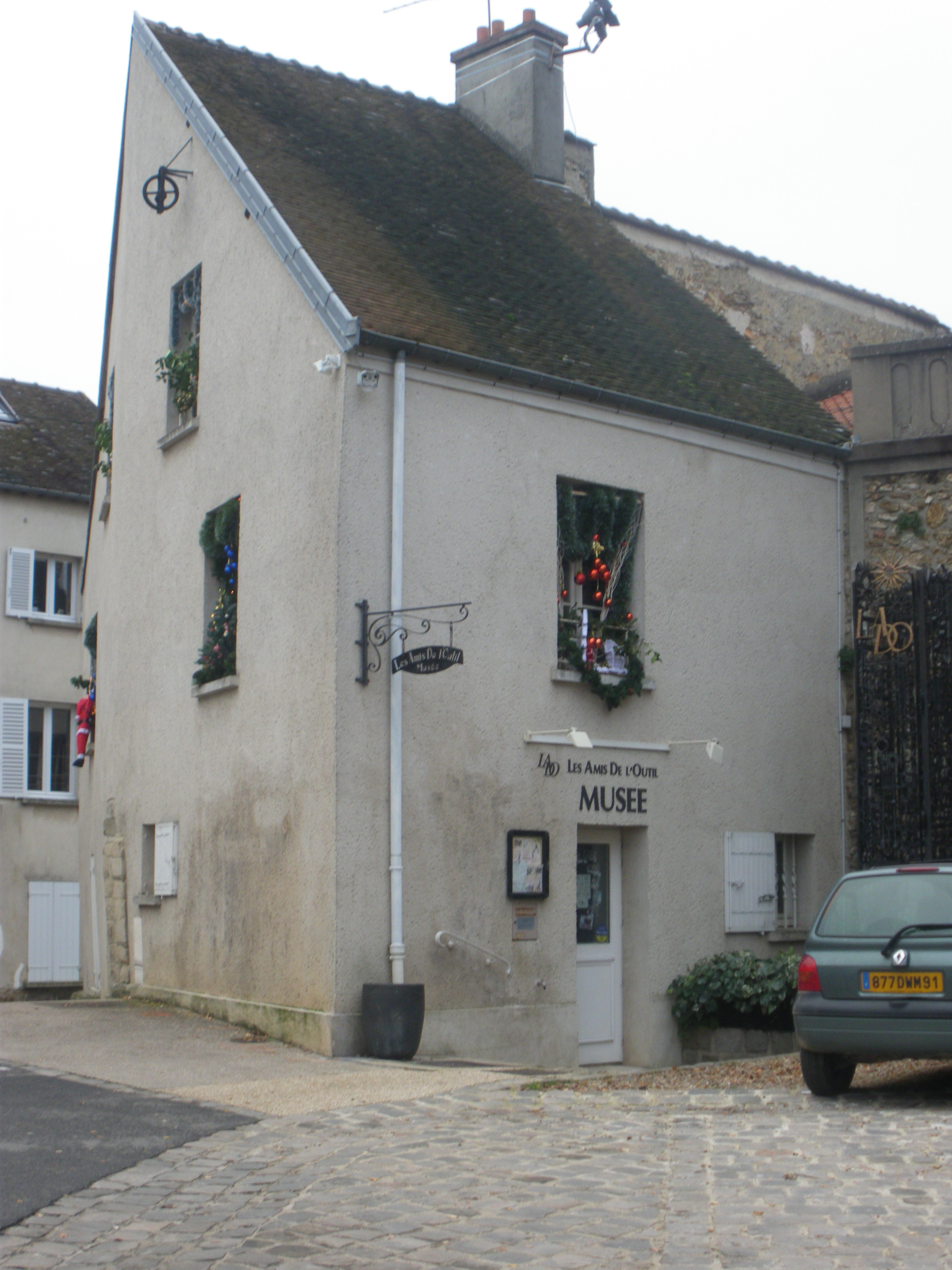
The Tool Museum
