= Rennemoulin =

- Commune
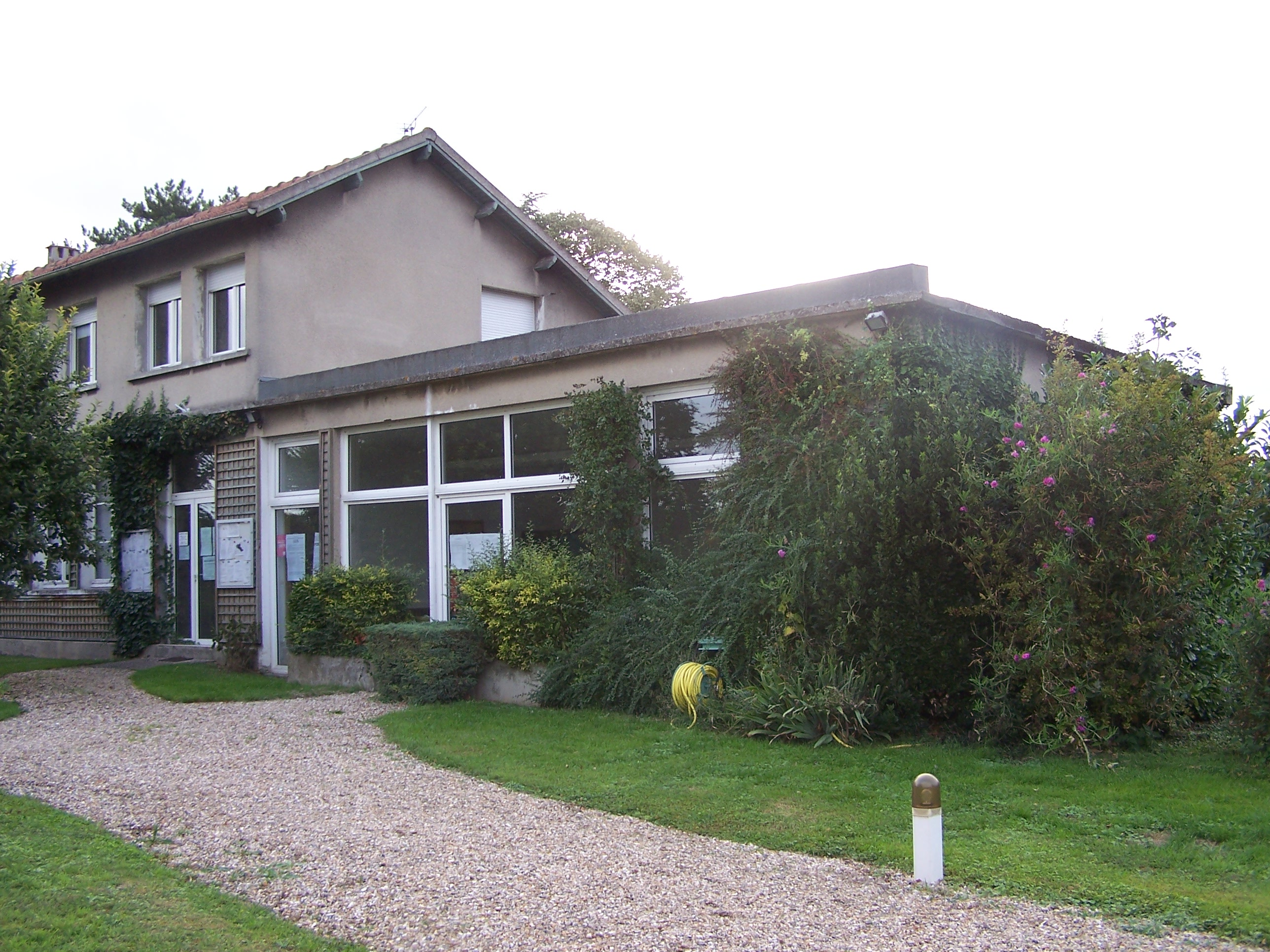
- Town hall

- Coat of arms
- Location of Rennemoulin
- Location within France Location within Île-de-France (region)
- Coordinates: 48°50′04″N 2°02′38″E
- Country: France
- Region: Île-de-France
- Department: Yvelines
- Arrondissement: Versailles
- Canton: Saint-Cyr-l'École
- Intercommunality: CA Versailles Grand Parc

Government
  - Mayor (2020–2026): Arnaud Hourdin
- Area^{1}: 2.22 km^{2} (0.86 sq mi)
- Elevation: 106 m (348 ft)
- Highest elevation: 125 m (410 ft)
- Lowest elevation: 86 m (282 ft)
- Population (2023): 116
  - Density: 52.3/km^{2} (135/sq mi)
- Time zone: UTC+01:00 (CET)
  - Summer (DST): UTC+02:00 (CEST)
- INSEE/Postal code: 78518 /78590
- ^{1} French Land Register data, which excludes lakes, ponds, glaciers > 1 km^{2} (0.386 sq mi or 247 acres) and river estuaries.

Rennemoulin (French pronunciation: [ʁɛnmulɛ̃]) is a commune in the Yvelines department in the Île-de-France in north-central France.

== See also ==
- Communes of the Yvelines department
