= Villepreux =

- Commune
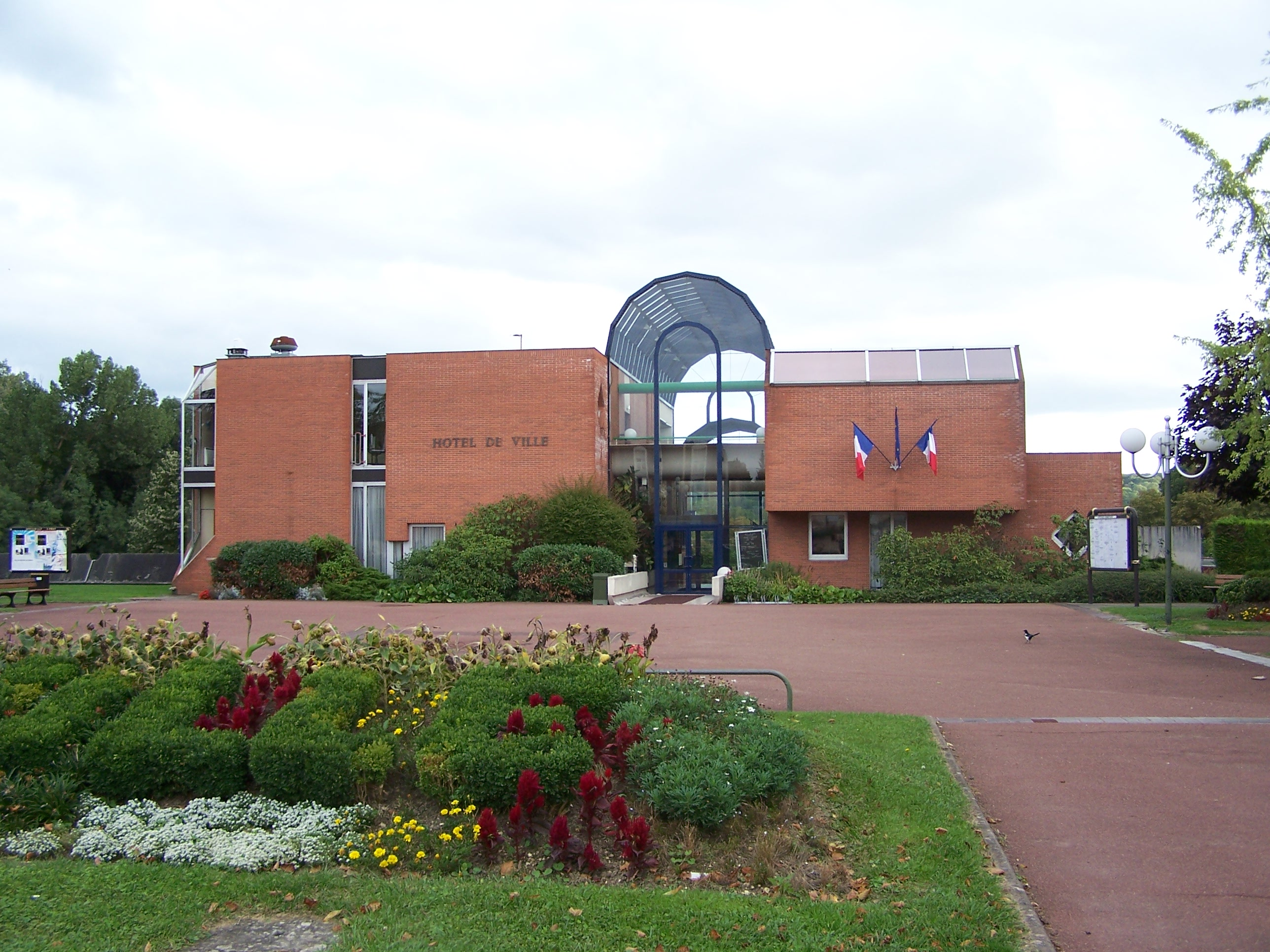
- Town hall

- Coat of arms
- Location of Villepreux
- Location within France Location within Île-de-France (region)
- Coordinates: 48°49′51″N 2°00′11″E
- Country: France
- Region: Île-de-France
- Department: Yvelines
- Arrondissement: Versailles
- Canton: Saint-Cyr-l'École
- Intercommunality: Saint-Quentin-en-Yvelines

Government
  - Mayor (2020–2026): Jean-Baptiste Hamonic
- Area^{1}: 10.40 km^{2} (4.02 sq mi)
- Highest elevation: 155 m (509 ft)
- Lowest elevation: 82 m (269 ft)
- Population (2023): 11,931
  - Density: 1,147/km^{2} (2,971/sq mi)
- Time zone: UTC+01:00 (CET)
  - Summer (DST): UTC+02:00 (CEST)
- INSEE/Postal code: 78674 /78450
- ^{1} French Land Register data, which excludes lakes, ponds, glaciers > 1 km^{2} (0.386 sq mi or 247 acres) and river estuaries.

Villepreux (French: [vilpʁø]) is a commune in the Yvelines department in the Île-de-France in north-central France located about 12 km west of Versailles, in the plaine de Versailles, almost in line with the perspective of the Grand Canal (an axis corresponding to the former Allée royale de Villepreux).

== Geography ==
The municipality, in low relief, is marked in the northern part of the depression of the valley ru Gally, and its tributaries, the ru de l'Oisemont and the ru de l'Arcy. The municipality is still largely rural. Urbanization is about 15% of the area, developed in the southern part, in the vicinity of Clayes-sous-Bois in the area served by railway services from Paris and Versailles.

The commune is primarily a historical village established around a castle built by the Francini family which today belongs to the family of the counts of Saint-Seine.

Further south, towards the SNCF train station, is the La Haie Bergerie quarter, a subdivision created by Jacques Riboud and his architect Roland Predieri -who later became the Mayor of Villepreux. Since the early 1960s terraced houses have since been rehabilitated by new generations of owners.

Towards the west, is a new division called Trianon, near the Pointe-à-l'Ange area, with built-up quality buildings, pavilions, and lush fields on the edge of the municipality of Chavenay. This is also the Val Joyeux area, another subdivision of 400 houses, dating from the post-war period and small newer residential houses and apartments on the edge of the forest of Bois d'Arcy.

The center has moved from the old village to the new neighborhoods.

The town is crossed in its southeastern part (Val Joyeux) by the l'aqueduc de l'Avre.

== Population ==
Historical population
Year	Pop.	±% p.a.
1968	6,926	—
1975	8,377	+2.75%
1982	7,398	−1.76%
1990	8,776	+2.16%
1999	9,601	+1.00%
2007	9,878	+0.36%
2012	9,927	+0.10%
2017	10,947	+1.98%
2023	11,931	+1.44%
Source: INSEE

== Education ==
Preschools:

- Le Clos Crozatier
- Le Prieuré
- Le Val Joyeux

Elementary schools:

- Jacques Gillet
- Jean de la Fontaine (Buildings A and B)
- Gérard Philipe
- Le Rased

There is one junior high school, Collège Léon Blum, and one senior high school/sixth form college, Lycée Sonia Delaunay.

== See also ==
- Communes of the Yvelines department
