= Bailly, Yvelines =

Bailly
- Commune
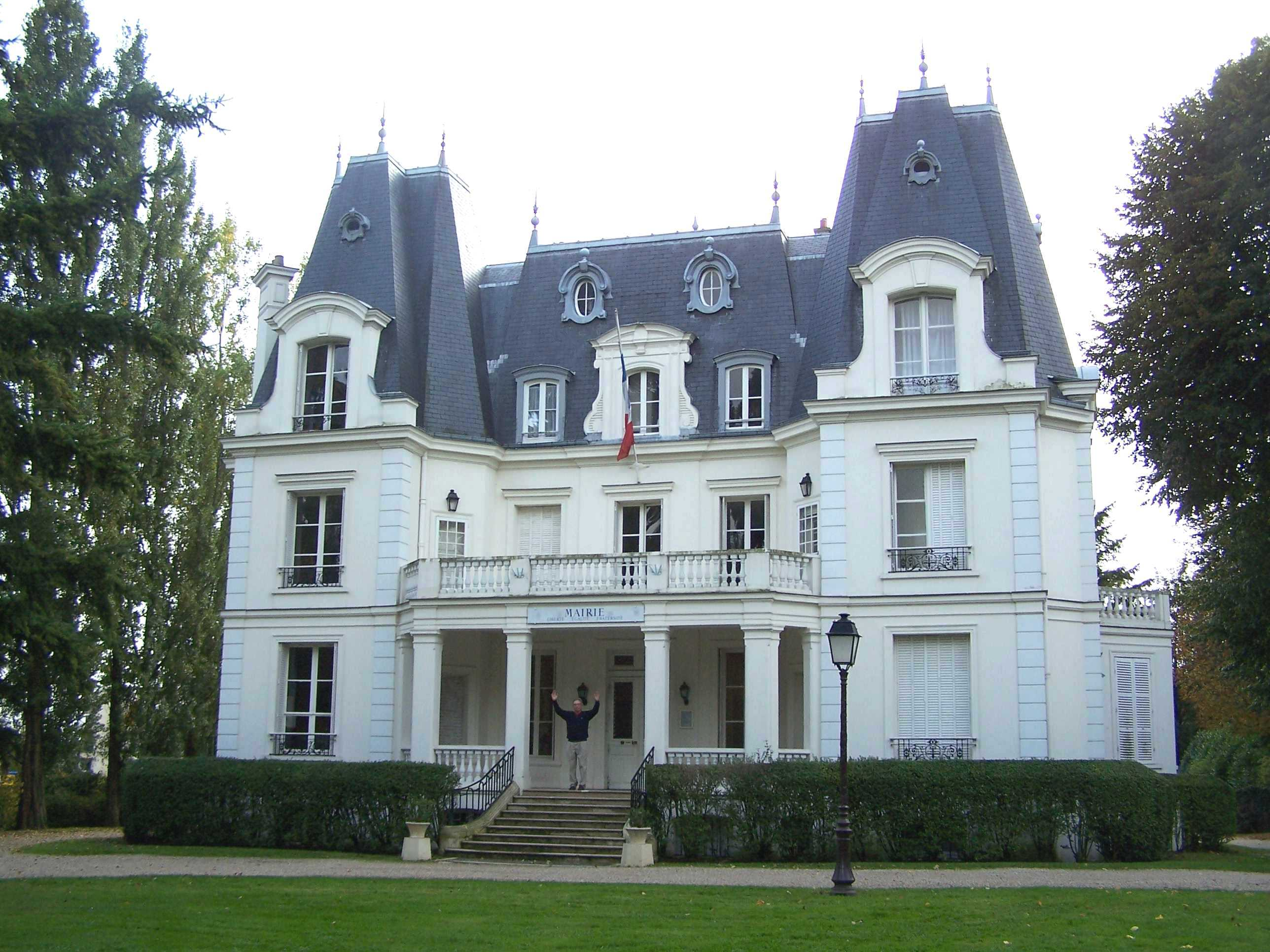
- Town hall

- Coat of arms
- Location of Bailly
- Location within France Location within Île-de-France (region)
- Coordinates: 48°50′31″N 2°04′41″E
- Country: France
- Region: Île-de-France
- Department: Yvelines
- Arrondissement: Versailles
- Canton: Le Chesnay-Rocquencourt
- Intercommunality: CA Versailles Grand Parc

Government
  - Mayor (2020–2026): Jacques Alexis
- Area^{1}: 6.53 km^{2} (2.52 sq mi)
- Elevation: 181 m (594 ft)
- Highest elevation: 182 m (597 ft)
- Lowest elevation: 92 m (302 ft)
- Population (2023): 3,731
  - Density: 571/km^{2} (1,480/sq mi)
- Time zone: UTC+01:00 (CET)
  - Summer (DST): UTC+02:00 (CEST)
- INSEE/Postal code: 78043 /78870
- ^{1} French Land Register data, which excludes lakes, ponds, glaciers > 1 km^{2} (0.386 sq mi or 247 acres) and river estuaries.

Bailly (French pronunciation: [baji]) is a commune in the Yvelines department in north-central France.

== Population ==
Historical population
| Year | Pop. | ±% p.a. |
|---|---|---|
| 1968 | 1,191 | — |
| 1975 | 1,885 | +6.78% |
| 1982 | 3,679 | +10.02% |
| 1990 | 4,145 | +1.50% |
| 1999 | 4,094 | −0.14% |
| 2007 | 3,999 | −0.29% |
| 2012 | 3,894 | −0.53% |
| 2017 | 3,721 | −0.90% |
| 2023 | 3,731 | +0.04% |
Source: INSEE

== See also ==
- Communes of the Yvelines department
