= Toussus-le-Noble =

- Commune
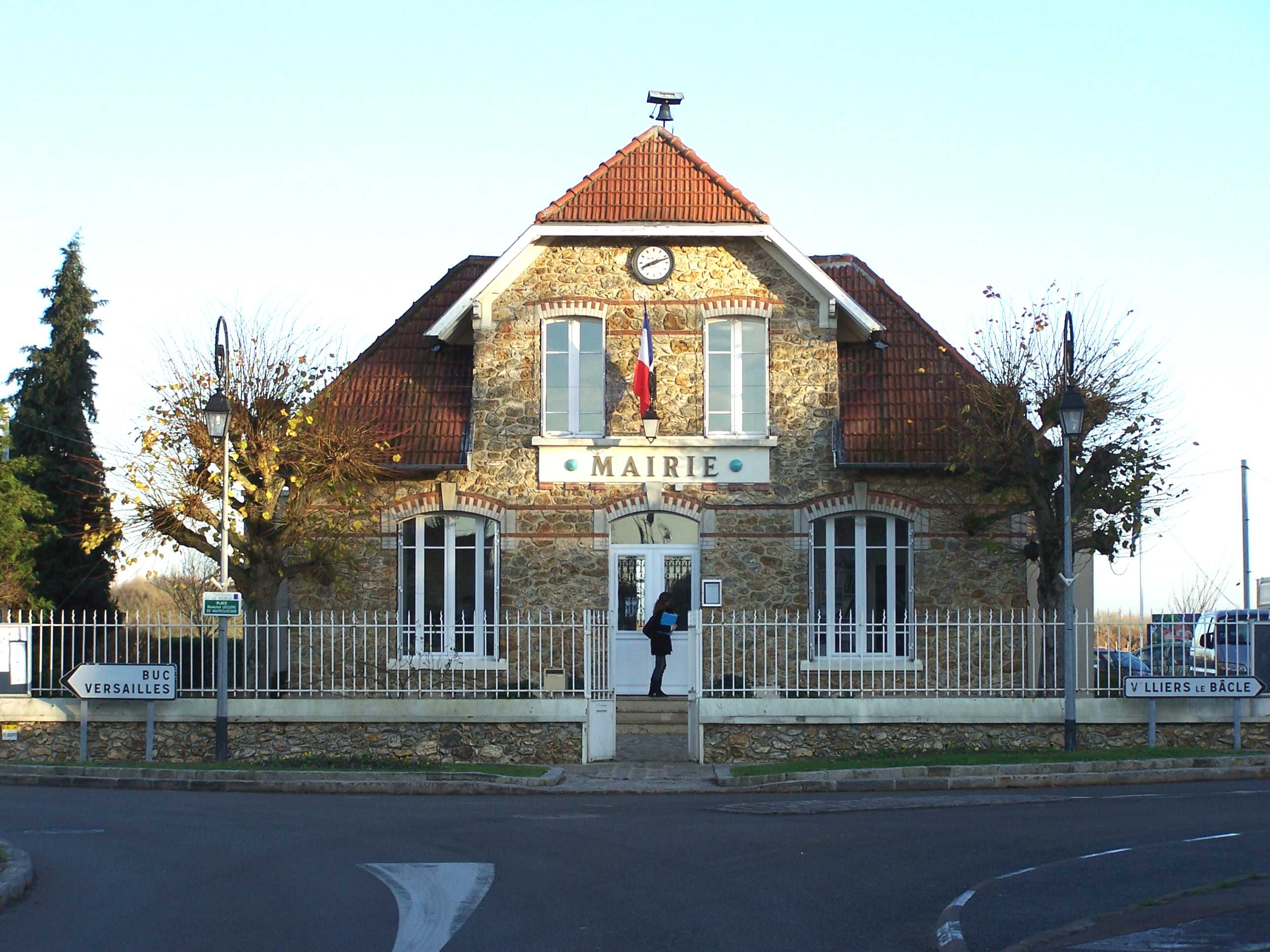
- Town hall

- Coat of arms
- Location of Toussus-le-Noble
- Location within France Location within Île-de-France (region)
- Coordinates: 48°44′52″N 2°06′54″E
- Country: France
- Region: Île-de-France
- Department: Yvelines
- Arrondissement: Versailles
- Canton: Maurepas
- Intercommunality: CA Versailles Grand Parc

Government
  - Mayor (2020–2026): Vanessa Auroy
- Area^{1}: 4.02 km^{2} (1.55 sq mi)
- Elevation: 153 m (502 ft)
- Highest elevation: 163 m (535 ft)
- Lowest elevation: 130 m (430 ft)
- Population (2023): 1,172
  - Density: 292/km^{2} (755/sq mi)
- Demonym: Nobeltussois
- Time zone: UTC+01:00 (CET)
  - Summer (DST): UTC+02:00 (CEST)
- INSEE/Postal code: 78620 /78117
- Website: www.mairie-toussus.fr
- ^{1} French Land Register data, which excludes lakes, ponds, glaciers > 1 km^{2} (0.386 sq mi or 247 acres) and river estuaries.

Toussus-le-Noble (French pronunciation: [tusy l(ə) nɔbl]; lit. 'Toussus-the-Noble') is a commune in the Yvelines department in the Île-de-France region in north-central France. It is southwest of Paris, on the departmental border with Essonne.

== History ==
In 1969, the communes of Châteaufort and Toussus-le-Noble were separated from the Essonne department and added to Yvelines.

== See also ==
- Communes of the Yvelines department
- Toussus-le-Noble Airport
