= Bois-d'Arcy, Yvelines =

Bois-d'Arcy
- Commune
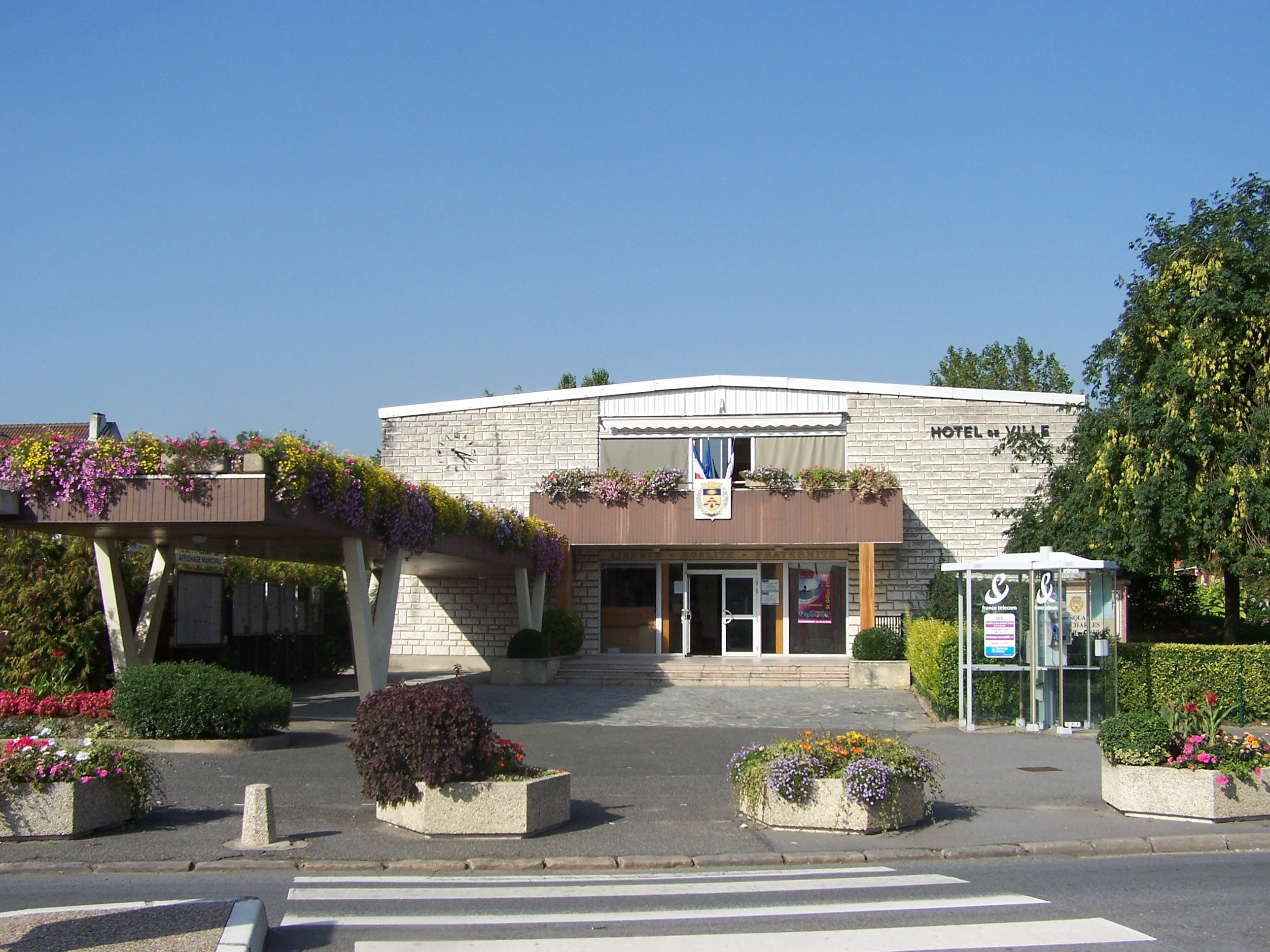
- Town hall

- Coat of arms
- Location of Bois-d'Arcy
- Location within France Location within Île-de-France (region)
- Coordinates: 48°48′N 2°02′E
- Country: France
- Region: Île-de-France
- Department: Yvelines
- Arrondissement: Versailles
- Canton: Saint-Cyr-l'École
- Intercommunality: CA Versailles Grand Parc

Government
  - Mayor (2024–2026): Philippe Benassaya
- Area^{1}: 5.48 km^{2} (2.12 sq mi)
- Highest elevation: 180 m (590 ft)
- Lowest elevation: 130 m (430 ft)
- Population (2023): 16,586
  - Density: 3,030/km^{2} (7,840/sq mi)
- Time zone: UTC+01:00 (CET)
  - Summer (DST): UTC+02:00 (CEST)
- INSEE/Postal code: 78073 /78390
- ^{1} French Land Register data, which excludes lakes, ponds, glaciers > 1 km^{2} (0.386 sq mi or 247 acres) and river estuaries.

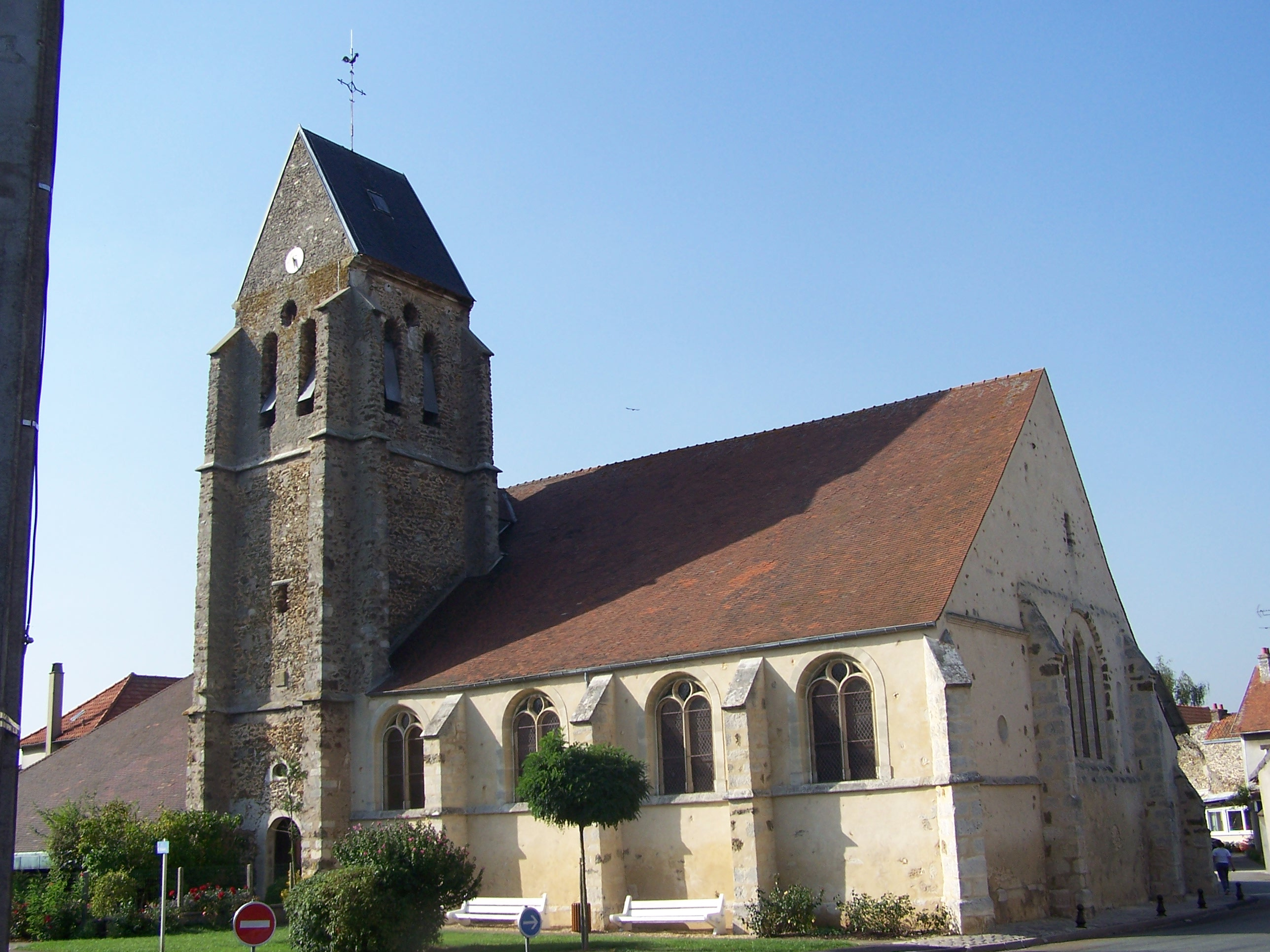
Saint-Leu–Saint-Gilles

Bois-d'Arcy (French pronunciation: [bwɑ daʁsi]) is a commune in the Yvelines department in north-central France.

It is one of the locations of the French film archives.

== Population ==
Historical population
| Year | Pop. | ±% p.a. |
|---|---|---|
| 1968 | 6,766 | — |
| 1975 | 10,231 | +6.09% |
| 1982 | 11,796 | +2.05% |
| 1990 | 12,693 | +0.92% |
| 1999 | 12,064 | −0.56% |
| 2007 | 13,505 | +1.42% |
| 2012 | 13,813 | +0.45% |
| 2017 | 15,142 | +1.85% |
| 2023 | 16,586 | +1.53% |
Source: INSEE
