= Les Loges-en-Josas =

- Commune
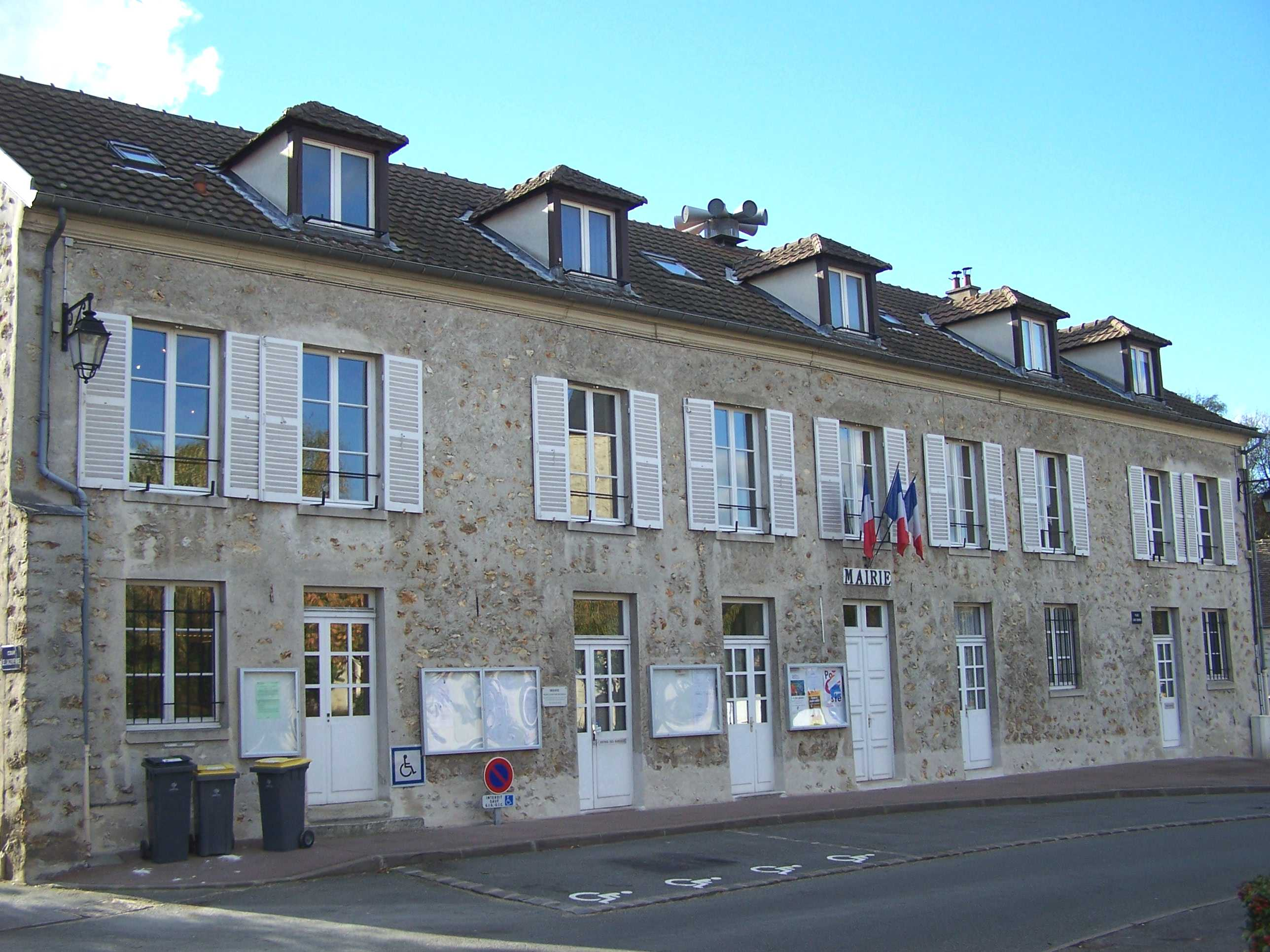
- Town hall
- Location of Les Loges-en-Josas
- Location within France Location within Île-de-France (region)
- Coordinates: 48°45′48″N 2°08′33″E
- Country: France
- Region: Île-de-France
- Department: Yvelines
- Arrondissement: Versailles
- Canton: Versailles-2
- Intercommunality: CA Versailles Grand Parc

Government
  - Mayor (2020–2026): Caroline Doucerain
- Area^{1}: 2.48 km^{2} (0.96 sq mi)
- Elevation: 160 m (520 ft)
- Highest elevation: 159 m (522 ft)
- Lowest elevation: 91 m (299 ft)
- Population (2023): 1,645
  - Density: 663/km^{2} (1,720/sq mi)
- Time zone: UTC+01:00 (CET)
  - Summer (DST): UTC+02:00 (CEST)
- INSEE/Postal code: 78343 /78350
- ^{1} French Land Register data, which excludes lakes, ponds, glaciers > 1 km^{2} (0.386 sq mi or 247 acres) and river estuaries.

Les Loges-en-Josas (French pronunciation: [le lɔʒ ɑ̃ ʒozas]) is a commune in the Yvelines department in the Île-de-France region in north-central France.

== See also ==
- Communes of the Yvelines department
