= Saint-Cyr-l'École =

- Commune
- Coat of arms

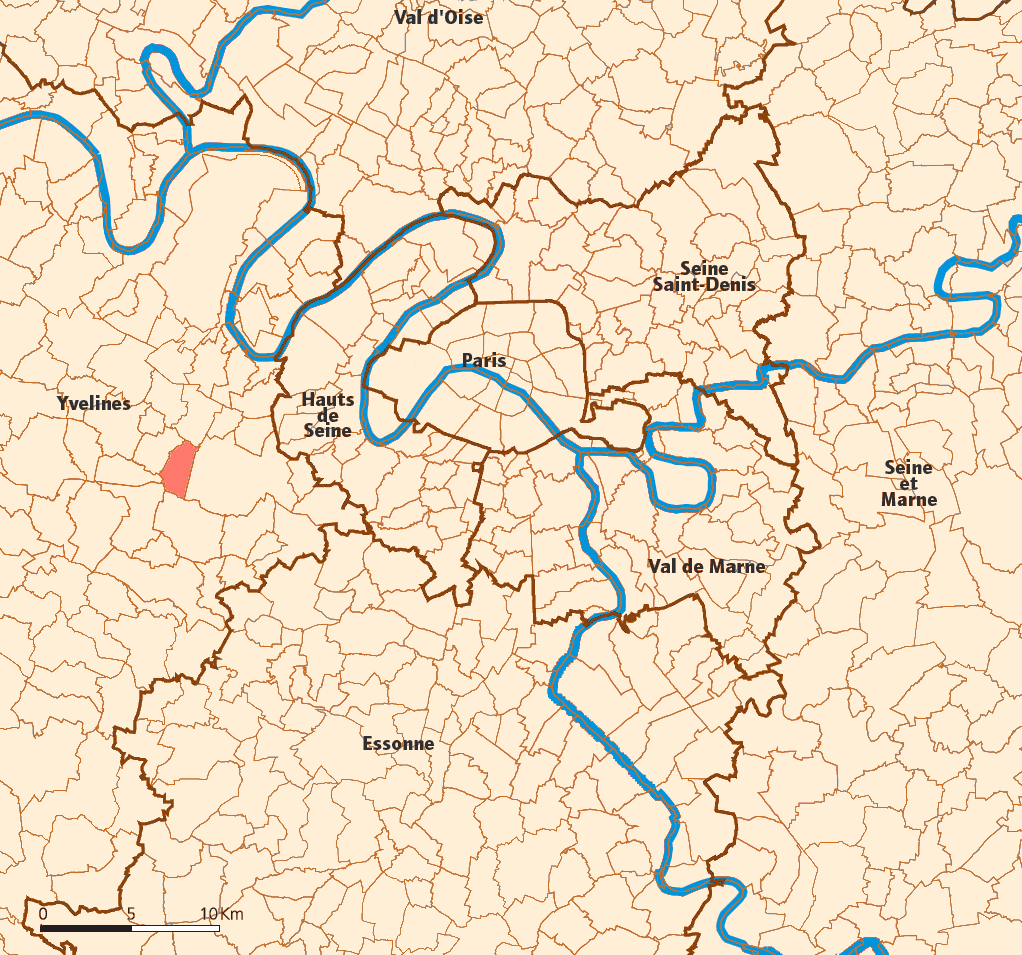
- Location (in red) within Paris inner and outer suburbs
- Location of Saint-Cyr-l'École
- Location within France Location within Île-de-France (region)
- Coordinates: 48°48′03″N 2°03′48″E
- Country: France
- Region: Île-de-France
- Department: Yvelines
- Arrondissement: Versailles
- Canton: Saint-Cyr-l'École
- Intercommunality: CA Versailles Grand Parc

Government
  - Mayor (2020–2026): Sonia Brau
- Area^{1}: 5.01 km^{2} (1.93 sq mi)
- Elevation: 158 m (518 ft)
- Highest elevation: 174 m (571 ft)
- Lowest elevation: 99 m (325 ft)
- Population (2023): 21,268
  - Density: 4,250/km^{2} (11,000/sq mi)
- Time zone: UTC+01:00 (CET)
  - Summer (DST): UTC+02:00 (CEST)
- INSEE/Postal code: 78545 /78210
- ^{1} French Land Register data, which excludes lakes, ponds, glaciers > 1 km^{2} (0.386 sq mi or 247 acres) and river estuaries.

Saint-Cyr-l'École (French pronunciation: [sɛ̃ siʁ lekɔl]) is a commune in the western suburbs of Paris, France. It is located 21.4 km (13.3 mi) from the centre of Paris.

It used to host the training school for officers of the French army, the École spéciale militaire de Saint-Cyr (ESM), which was relocated to Coëtquidan in 1945. The old buildings of the ESM are now used by the lycée militaire de Saint-Cyr (military high school of Saint-Cyr).

Inhabitants are called Saint-Cyriens (uppercase, with students or graduates from the school called saint-cyriens with lowercase).

== Geography ==
Saint-Cyr lies in the arrondissement of Versailles, west of the Park of Versailles. It is named after St. Cyricus.

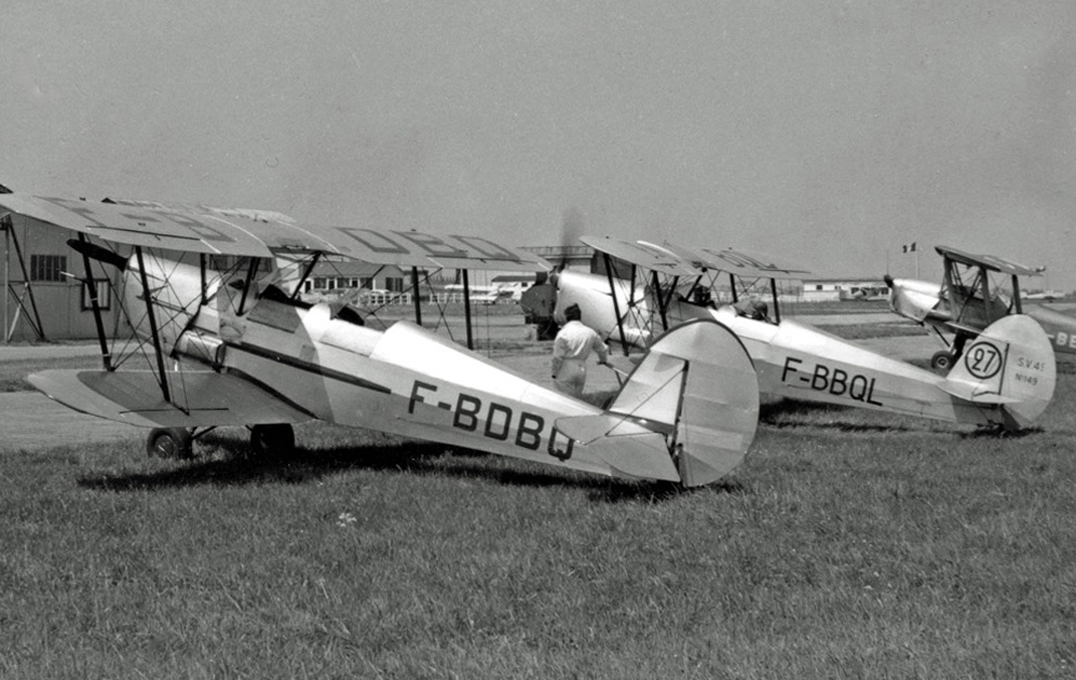
Stampe SV.4 training biplanes at the airfield in 1957

Saint-Cyr-l'École is served by Saint-Cyr station, which is an interchange station on Paris RER line C, on the Transilien Line U suburban rail line, and on the Transilien Line N suburban rail line.

Saint-Cyr-l'Ecole airfield is long established and lies on the edge of the commune. It is used by light aircraft flown by private pilot owners and by members of aero clubs. It is operated for public use by Aéroports de Paris.

== History ==
The Hôtel de Ville

King Louis XIV, at the request of Madame de Maintenon, founded Maison royale de Saint-Louis, an institute for poor young ladies. It later became a military hospital. Napoleon founded the military academy for infantry and cavalry officers in 1808. The Hôtel de Ville was completed in 1956.

The tomb of Madame de Maintenon lies in the Chapel.

== Population ==
Historical population
Year	Pop.	±% p.a.
1968	16,001	—
1975	16,537	+0.47%
1982	14,996	−1.39%
1990	14,829	−0.14%
1999	14,566	−0.20%
2007	16,710	+1.73%
2012	17,562	+1.00%
2017	18,795	+1.37%
2023	21,268	+2.08%
Source: INSEE

== Education ==
Schools in the city include:

Preschools:

- Robert Desnos
- Victor Hugo
- Léon Jouannet
- Paul Langevin
- Jean Macé
- Henri Wallon

Elementary schools:

- Ernest Bizet
- Jean Jaurès
- Irène Joliot-Curie
- Romain Rolland

There is one junior high school, Collège Jean Racine.

Senior high schools/sixth form colleges:

- Lycée Mansart
- Lycée professionnel Jean Perrin
- Lycée militaire de Saint-Cyr

Bibliothèque Albert Camus, which opened on 14 November 2013, is the community library. The town also has the Institut aérotechnique, a research Institute in aerodynamics created in 1911.

== Parks and recreation ==
The Centre aquatique de St-Cyr has the swimming facilities in the town.

== Twin towns – sister cities ==
- Butzbach, Germany – since 2008
- Bonnyrigg & Lasswade, Midlothian, Scotland

== Personalities ==
- Armand Laroche (1826–1903), painter
- Marie Jules César Lelorgne de Savigny (1777–1851), zoologist, died in Saint-Cyr-l'École

== See also ==
- Communes of the Yvelines department
