= Élancourt =

- Commune
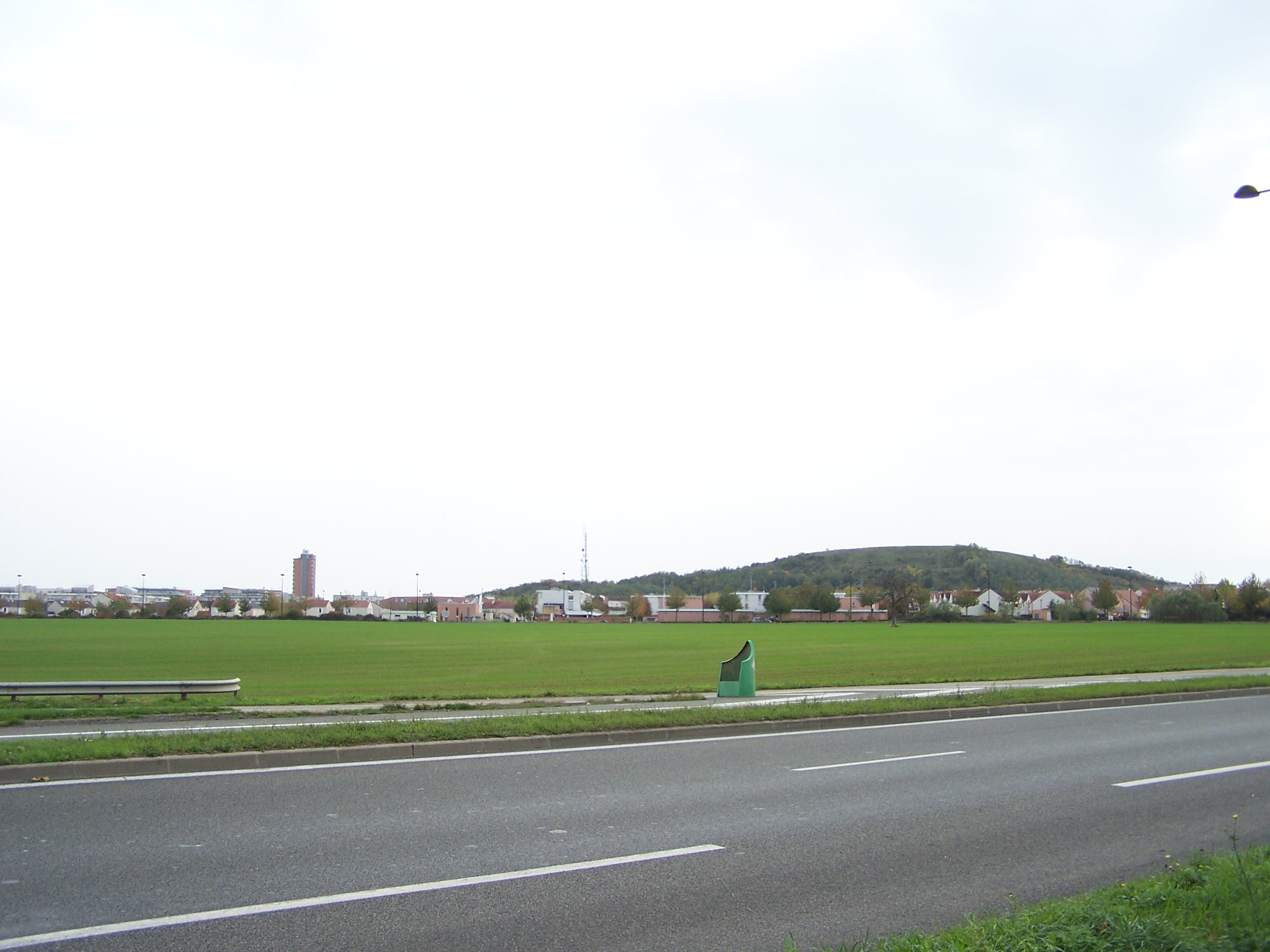
- Neighbourhood of Clef de Saint-Pierre and Colline d'Élancourt

- Coat of arms

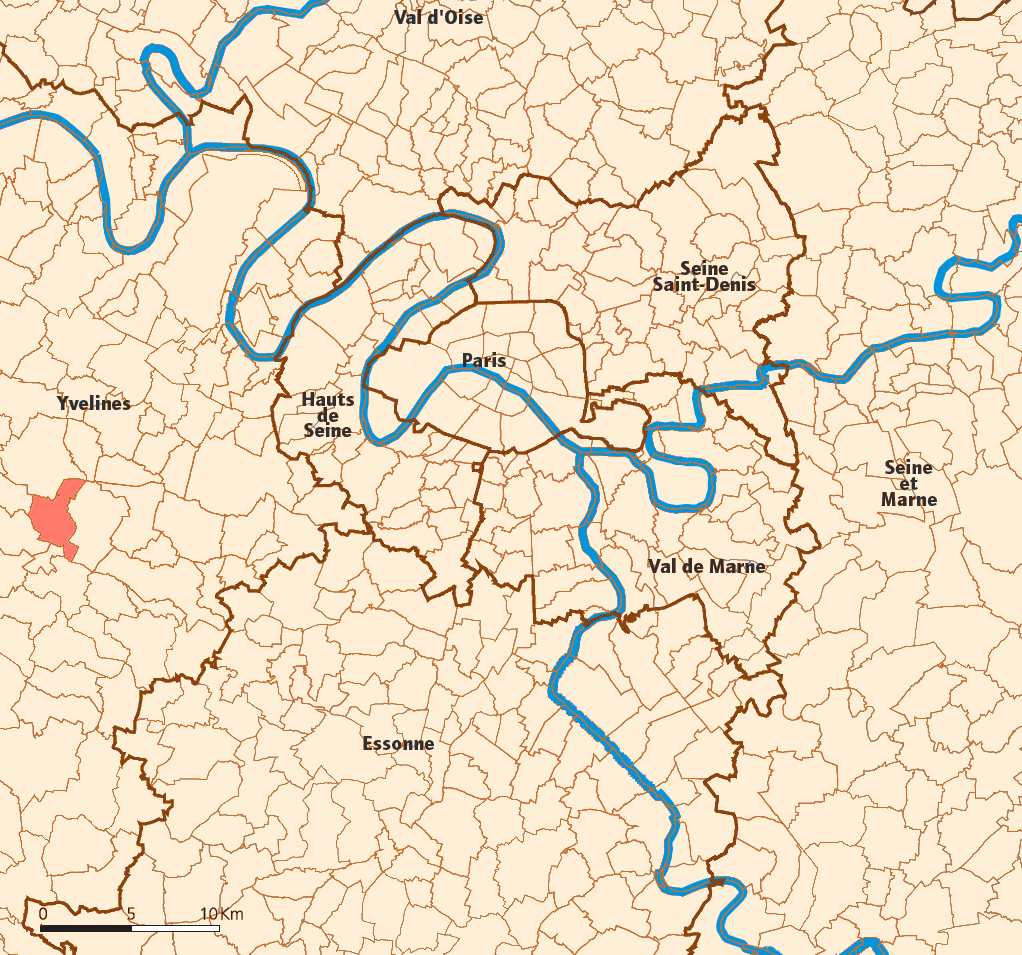
- Location (in red) within Paris inner and outer suburbs
- Location of Élancourt
- Location within France Location within Île-de-France (region)
- Coordinates: 48°47′05″N 1°57′32″E
- Country: France
- Region: Île-de-France
- Department: Yvelines
- Arrondissement: Rambouillet
- Canton: Trappes
- Intercommunality: Saint-Quentin-en-Yvelines

Government
  - Mayor (2020–2026): Jean-Michel Fourgous
- Area^{1}: 8.51 km^{2} (3.29 sq mi)
- Highest elevation: 175 m (574 ft)
- Lowest elevation: 100 m (330 ft)
- Population (2023): 26,365
  - Density: 3,100/km^{2} (8,020/sq mi)
- Time zone: UTC+01:00 (CET)
  - Summer (DST): UTC+02:00 (CEST)
- INSEE/Postal code: 78208 /78990
- ^{1} French Land Register data, which excludes lakes, ponds, glaciers > 1 km^{2} (0.386 sq mi or 247 acres) and river estuaries.

Élancourt (French pronunciation: [elɑ̃kuʁ]) is a commune in the Yvelines department, and the Île-de-France region, north central France. It is located in the western suburbs of Paris, 30.6 km (19.0 mi) from the center of Paris, in the "new town" of Saint-Quentin-en-Yvelines.

== History ==
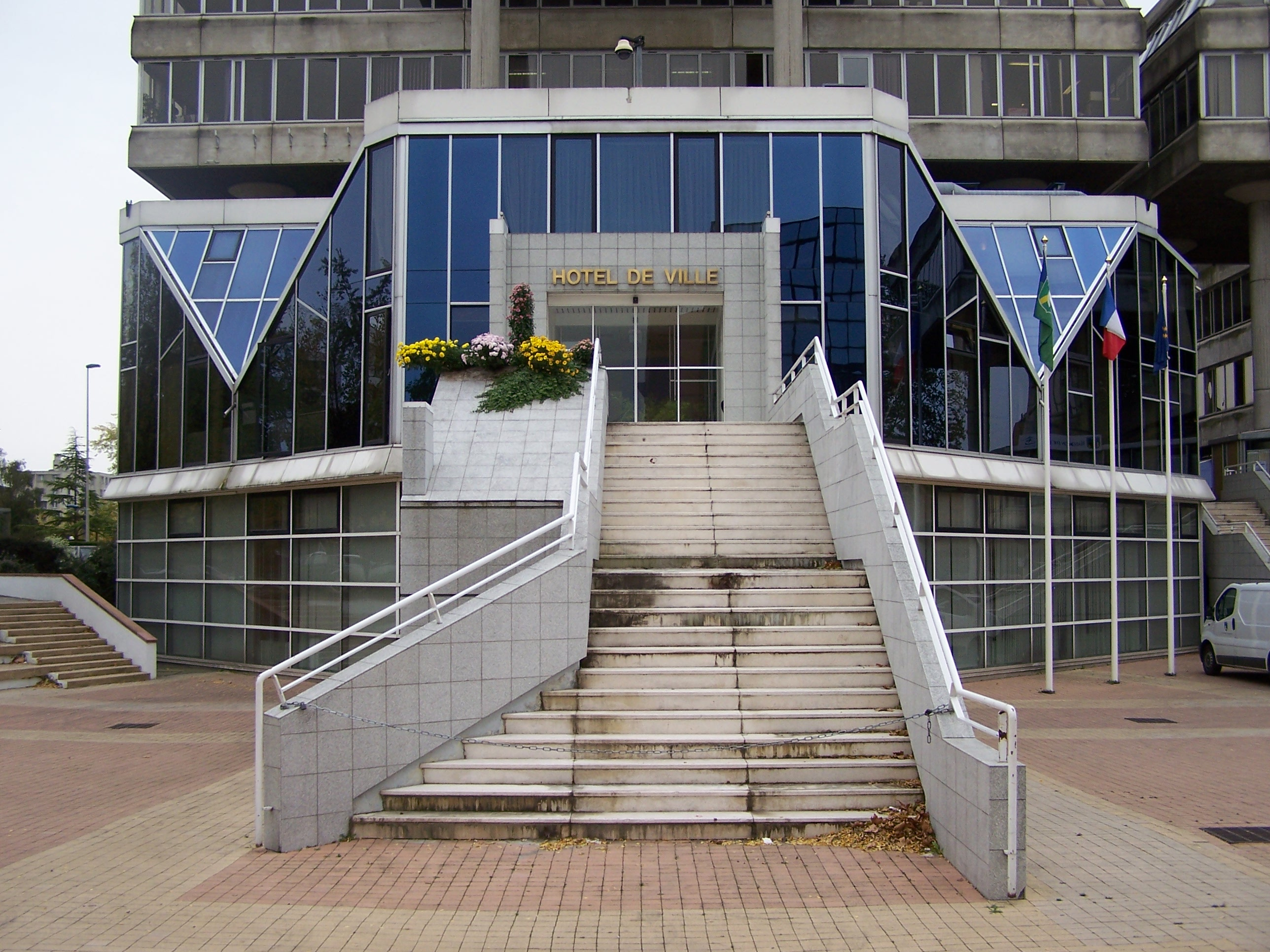
The Hôtel de Ville

The Hôtel de Ville was completed in 1978.

== Transport ==
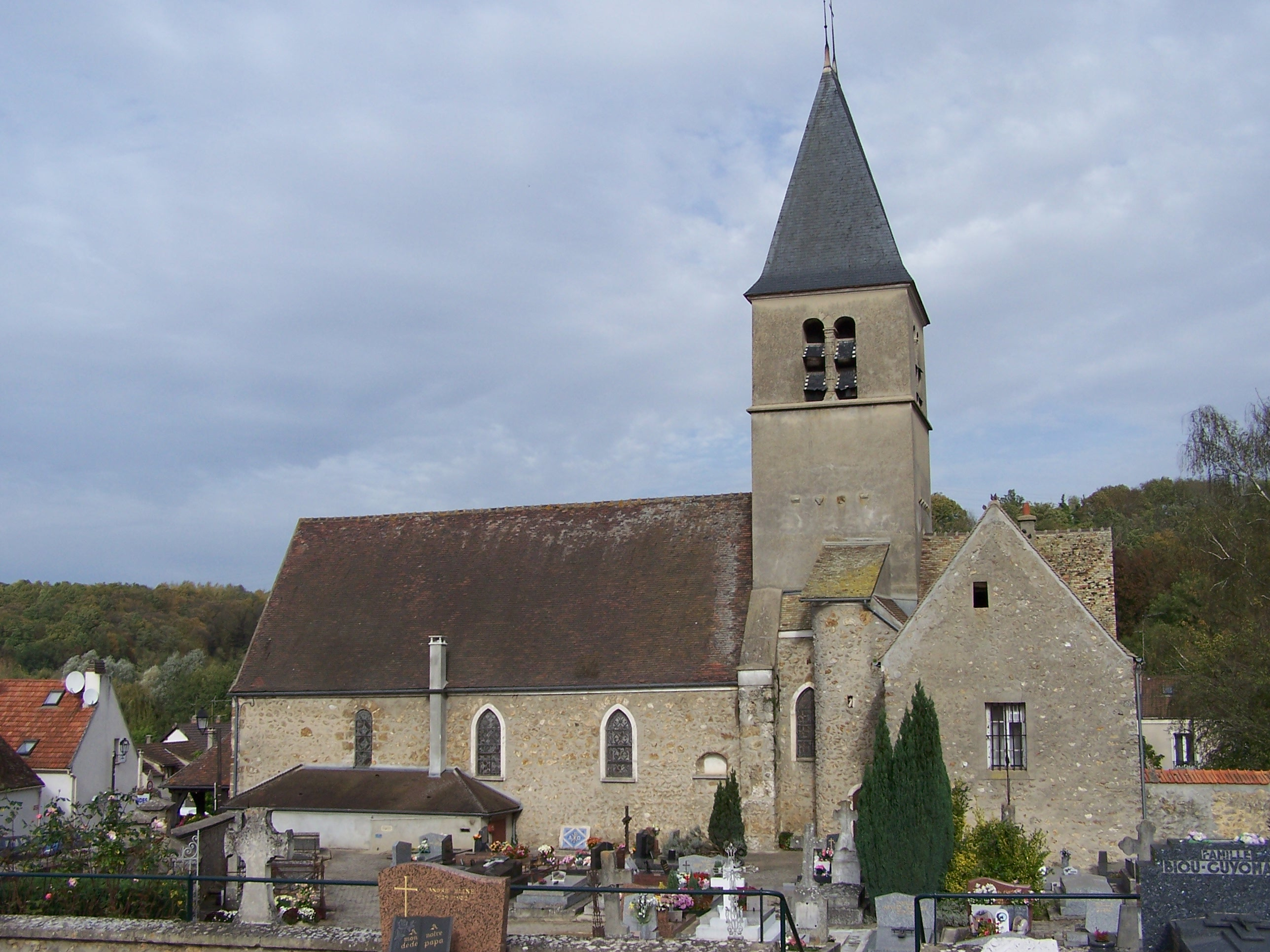
St. Medardus' Church

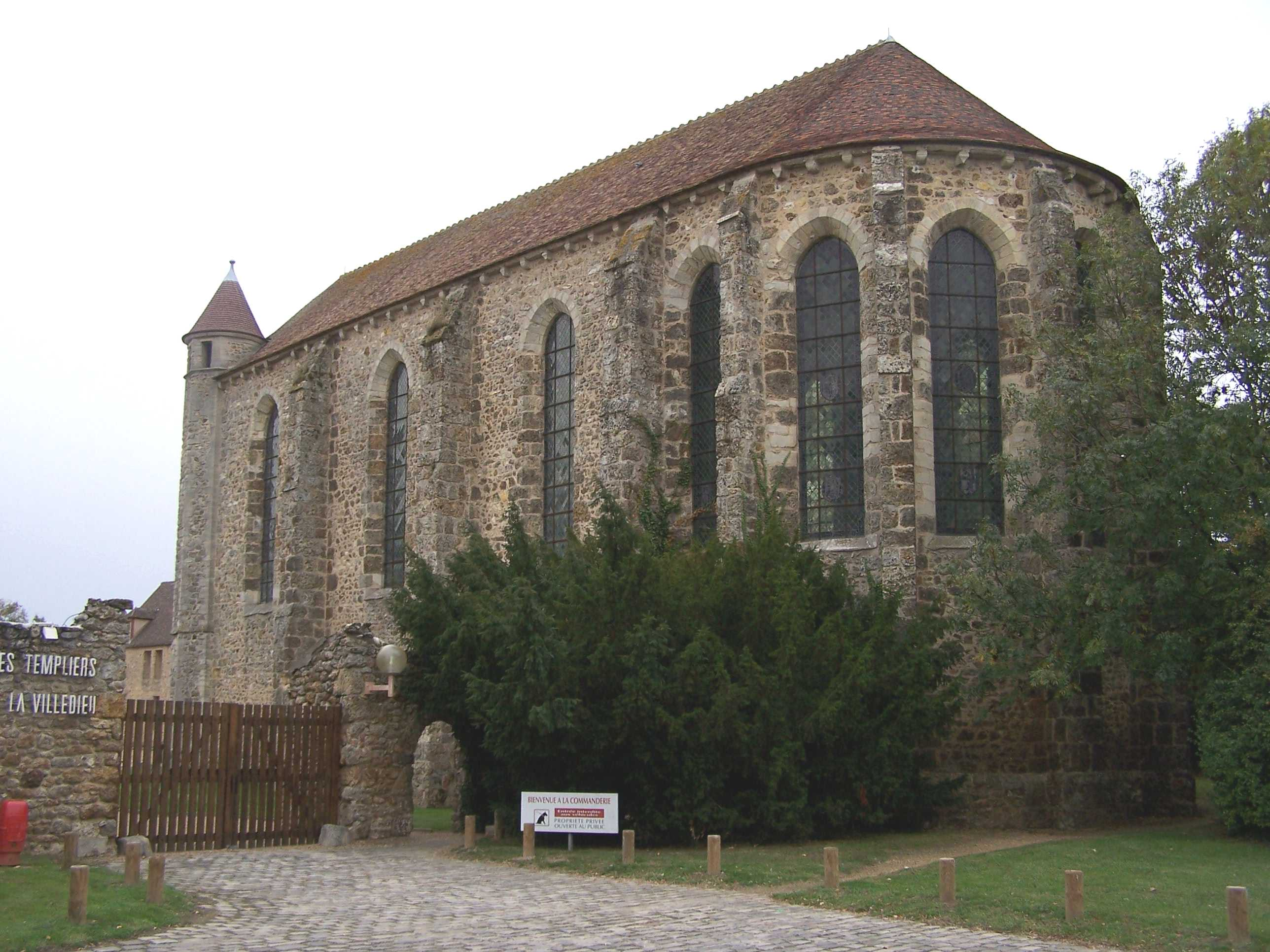
Commandry of the Villedieu

Élancourt is not linked directly to the Paris Métro, RER, or suburban rail network. The closest station to Élancourt is La Verrière station on the Transilien La Défense and Transilien Paris-Montparnasse suburban rail lines. This station is located in the neighbouring commune of La Verrière, 1.4 km (0.9 mi) from the town center of Élancourt.

== Population ==
Historical population

Year	Pop.	±% p.a.
1793	300	—
1821	312	+0.14%
1846	360	+0.57%
1872	632	+2.19%
1901	598	−0.19%
1926	910	+1.69%
1946	884	−0.14%
1954	900	+0.22%
1968	861	−0.32%

Year	Pop.	±% p.a.
1975	10,629	+43.19%
1982	20,129	+9.55%
1990	22,584	+1.45%
1999	26,655	+1.86%
2007	27,613	+0.44%
2012	26,488	−0.83%
2017	25,400	−0.84%
2023	26,365	+0.62%

Source: EHESS and INSEE (1968-2023)

== Tourism ==
France Miniature is a tourist attraction in Élancourt featuring scale models of major French landmarks and monuments in an outdoor park.

The Colline d'Élancourt, an artificial hill made by landfill, is the highest point in Île-de-France. It is a public park, and hosted the mountain biking events during the 2024 Summer Olympics in Paris.

== Education ==
The commune has 13 preschools and 10 elementary schools.

Public junior high schools in Élancourt:

- Collège de l’Agiot
- Collège de la Clef de Saint-Pierre
- Collège Louis Pergaud

In addition the community is served by Collège Alexandre Dumas and two public senior high schools/sixth form colleges, Lycée Dumont d’Urville and Lycée Polyvalent des 7 Mares, all in nearby Maurepas.

Versailles Saint-Quentin-en-Yvelines University provides tertiary educational services in the area.

== Twin towns – sister cities ==
Élancourt is twinned with:

- Laubach, Germany, since 1975
- Cassina de' Pecchi, Italy, since 1997
- Gräfenhainichen, Germany, since 2003
- Attard, Malta

== See also ==
- Communes of the Yvelines department
