= Milon =

Milon may refer to:

== First name ==
- Milo of Croton, ancient Greek wrestler
- Milon of Taranto, general under Pyrrhus of Epirus; see History of Taranto § Pyrrhic War
- St. Milon (c. 1158), bishop of Thérouanne in Artois
- St. Milon (c. 730), monk of Abbaye de Saint-Wandrille at Fontenelle
- Milon (cardinal) (died 1104), bishop of Suburbicarian Diocese of Palestrina
- Milon, Welsh knight in 13th-century medieval romance Lai de Milon by Marie de France

== Surname ==
- Titus Annius Milo, Roman senator, defended by Cicero in Pro Milone
- fr:Bertrand Milon (15th century), French diplomat, founder of the University of Nantes;
- fr:Joseph Milon (19th century), French painter
- Louis Milon (18th century), French dancer
- fr:Michaël Milon, French karateka
- Le Père Milon, story by Guy de Maupassant

== Places ==
- Milon-la-Chapelle, commune in Yvelines (78).
- La Ferté-Milon, commune of l'Aisne.

== Other ==
- AONS Milon, Greek sport club
- Milon's Secret Castle, a NES videogame about a character named Milon
