= Saint-Quentin-en-Yvelines =

Coordinates: 48°47′17.16″N 2°02′40.56″E

- Communauté d'agglomération
- Location within the Yvelines department
- Country: France
- Region: Île-de-France
- Department: Yvelines
- No. of communes: {{{nbcomm}}}
- Area: 119.2 km^{2} (46.0 sq mi)
- Population (2018): 228,312
  - Density: 1,915/km^{2} (4,961/sq mi)
- Website: www.saint-quentin-en-yvelines.fr

Saint-Quentin-en-Yvelines (French pronunciation: [sɛ̃ kɑ̃.tɛ̃ ɑ̃.n‿iv.lin]) is a new town and an agglomeration community in the French department of Yvelines. It is one of the original five villes nouvelles (new towns) of Paris and was named after the Saint Quentin Pond, which was chosen to become the town's centre. The town was built from a greenfield site starting in the 1960s. Its area is 119.2 km^{2}. In 2018, Saint-Quentin-en-Yvelines had a population of 228,312. It is part of the much larger Paris metropolitan area, and is around 25 km (16 mi) west of the centre of Paris.

== Administrative divisions ==
The communauté d'agglomération comprises 12 communes:

1. Les Clayes-sous-Bois
2. Coignières
3. Élancourt
4. Guyancourt
5. Magny-les-Hameaux
6. Maurepas
7. Montigny-le-Bretonneux
8. Plaisir
9. Trappes
10. La Verrière
11. Villepreux
12. Voisins-le-Bretonneux

Of these communes, Montigny-le-Bretonneux is the most centrally located and has the largest population. The 2 most important communes are Trappes and Montigny.

== Demographics ==
Historical population
Year	Pop.	±% p.a.
1968	51,393	—
1975	109,484	+11.41%
1982	163,605	+5.91%
1990	204,010	+2.80%
1999	224,259	+1.06%
2007	227,888	+0.20%
2012	226,469	−0.12%
2017	229,353	+0.25%
2023	234,797	+0.39%
Populations of the area corresponding with the communauté d'agglomération at 1 January 2025. Source: INSEE

Its president is Jean-Michel Fourgous.

Until 2019, Saint-Quentin-en-Yvelines served as the start and finish point of the famous Paris–Brest–Paris bicycling endurance event.

== Economy ==
Europcar has its head office in the business park of Val Saint-Quentin at Voisins-le-Bretonneux. It previously had its head office in the Immeuble Les Quadrants in Saint-Quentin-en-Yvelines.

At one time Bouygues had its head office in the Kevin Roche-designed Challenger complex in Saint-Quentin-en-Yvelines. It is now occupied by Bouygues Construction, one of the group's subsidiaries.

Le Golf National is a private golf course in Saint-Quentin. It hosted the 2018 Ryder Cup.

== Sport ==
Vélodrome de Saint-Quentin-en-Yvelines

The city has a velodrome, the Vélodrome de Saint-Quentin-en-Yvelines. It was built between 2011 and 2014 and hosted the 2015 UCI Track Cycling World Championships and the 2016 UEC European Track Championships. Next to the velodrome is also a BMX track.

Between 1991 and 2015, Saint-Quentin-en-Yvelines was the start and finish location for the Paris-Brest-Paris randonnée.

== Education ==
Universities:

- Versailles Saint-Quentin-en-Yvelines University

Senior high schools/sixth form colleges:

- Lycée les Sept Mares (Maurepas)
- Lycée Sonia Delaunay (Villepreux)
- Lycée Dumont d'Urville (Maurepas)
- Lycée Descartes de Montigny le Bretonneux
- Lycée des métiers Louis Blériot (Trappes)
- Lycée d'hôtellerie et de tourisme de Guyancourt
- Lycée des métiers Henri Matisse (Trappes)
- Lycée de la Plaine de Neauphle (Trappes)
- Lycée de Villaroy (Guyancourt)
- Lycée Jean-Vilar (Plaisir)

International schools:

- Institut culturel franco-japonais (Montigny-le-Bretonneux)
