= Lycée Dumont d'Urville =

Lycée Dumont d'Urville may refer to the following French schools:

- Lycée Dumont d'Urville (Caen) in Caen
- Lycée Dumont d'Urville (Maurepas, Yvelines)
- Lycée Dumont-d'Urville (Toulon) in Toulon
