= Hôtel de Ville, Élancourt =

Town hall in Élancourt, France

Hôtel de Ville
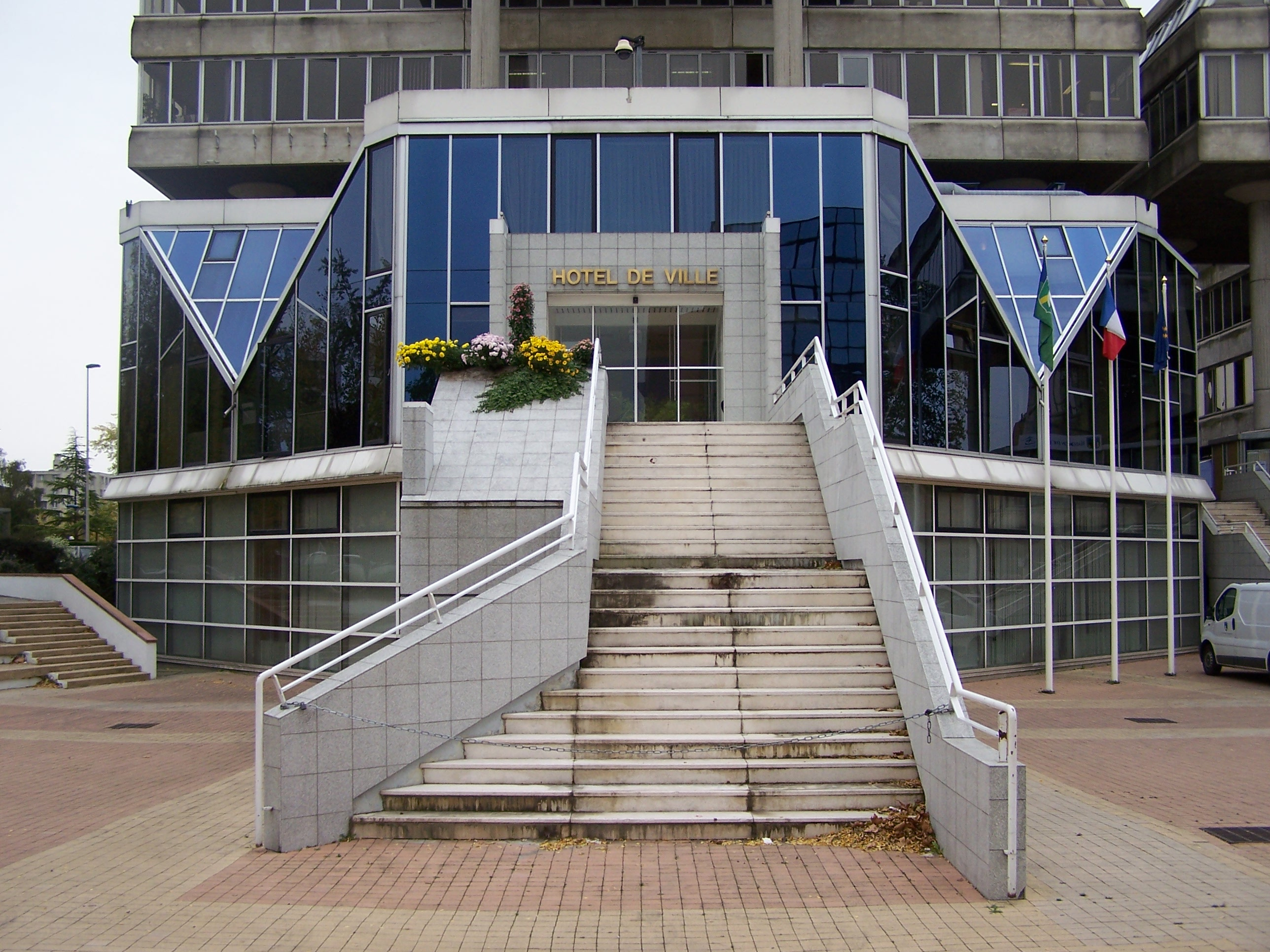
- The main frontage of the Hôtel de Ville in October 2006
- Interactive map of the Hôtel de Ville area

General information
- Type: City hall
- Architectural style: Brutalist style
- Location: Élancourt, France
- Coordinates: 48.7683°N 1.9493°E
- Completed: 1978

Design and construction
- Architects: Jacques Kalisz, Roger Salem and François Droucot

The Hôtel de Ville (French pronunciation: [otɛl də vil], City Hall) is a municipal building in Élancourt, Yvelines, in the western suburbs of Paris, standing on Place du Général de Gaulle.

== History ==
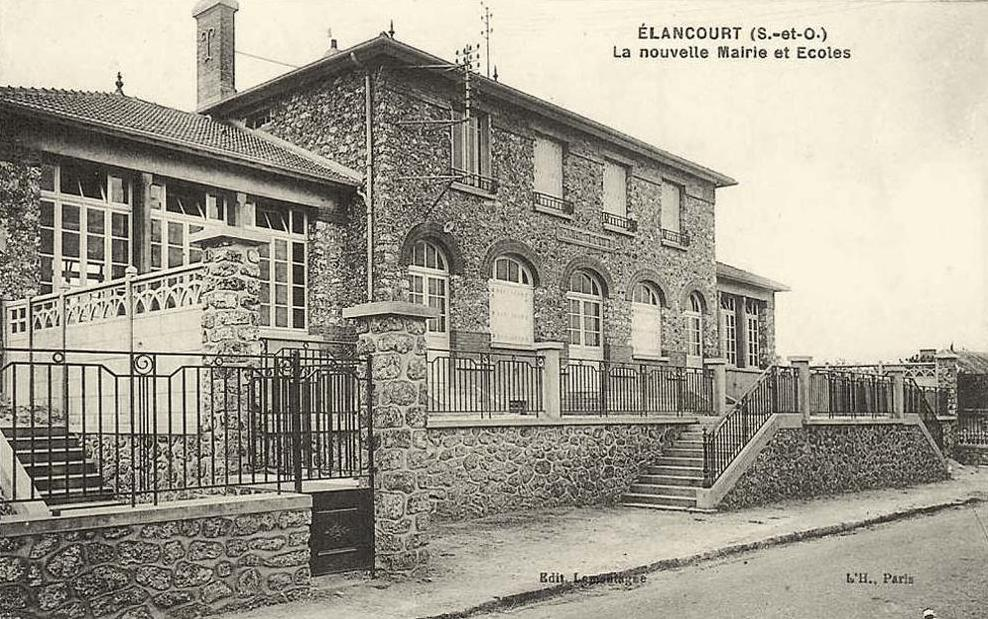
The old town hall

After the French Revolution the town council originally met in the house of the mayor of the time. This arrangement continued until the mid-19th century when the council decided to commission a combined town hall and school in the old part of the town. The design involved a two-storey central block of five bays and a pair of single-storey wings. The central block contained the municipal office, while the left-hand wing accommodated the boys' school and the right-hand wing accommodated the girls' school.

The building was identified for use as a museum of national education in the early 21st century. In June 2025, the area around the building was landscaped and preserved as the Anne Capiaux Space to commemorate the life of a former deputy mayor, Anne Capiaux.

In the early 1970s, following significant population growth, the town council led by the mayor, Georges Le Roux, decided to commission a modern town hall. The site they selected was on the southeast side of what is now Place du Général de Gaulle in the heart of the rapidly growing Sept Mares district. The building, which became known as "Le Capitole", was designed by Jacques Kalisz, Roger Salem and François Droucot in the brutalist style, built in concrete and glass and was completed in 1978.

The design involved a steep flight of steps leading up to a canted glass entrance which led to series of rectangular spaces which were supported by columns and projected in various directions. The spaces were faced with alternating bands of concrete and glass.

Between 2013 and 2014, some of the upper spaces were converted to create 161 student housing units, leaving the lower spaces occupied by the municipal offices. The new development was named the Résidence étudiante René Cassin (René Cassin student residence) to commemorate the life of the former member of the Constitutional Council, René Cassin, and brought under the management of the Centre Régional des Œuvres Universitaires et Scolaires (Regional Centre for University and School Services).
