= Châteaufort, Yvelines =

Châteaufort
- Commune
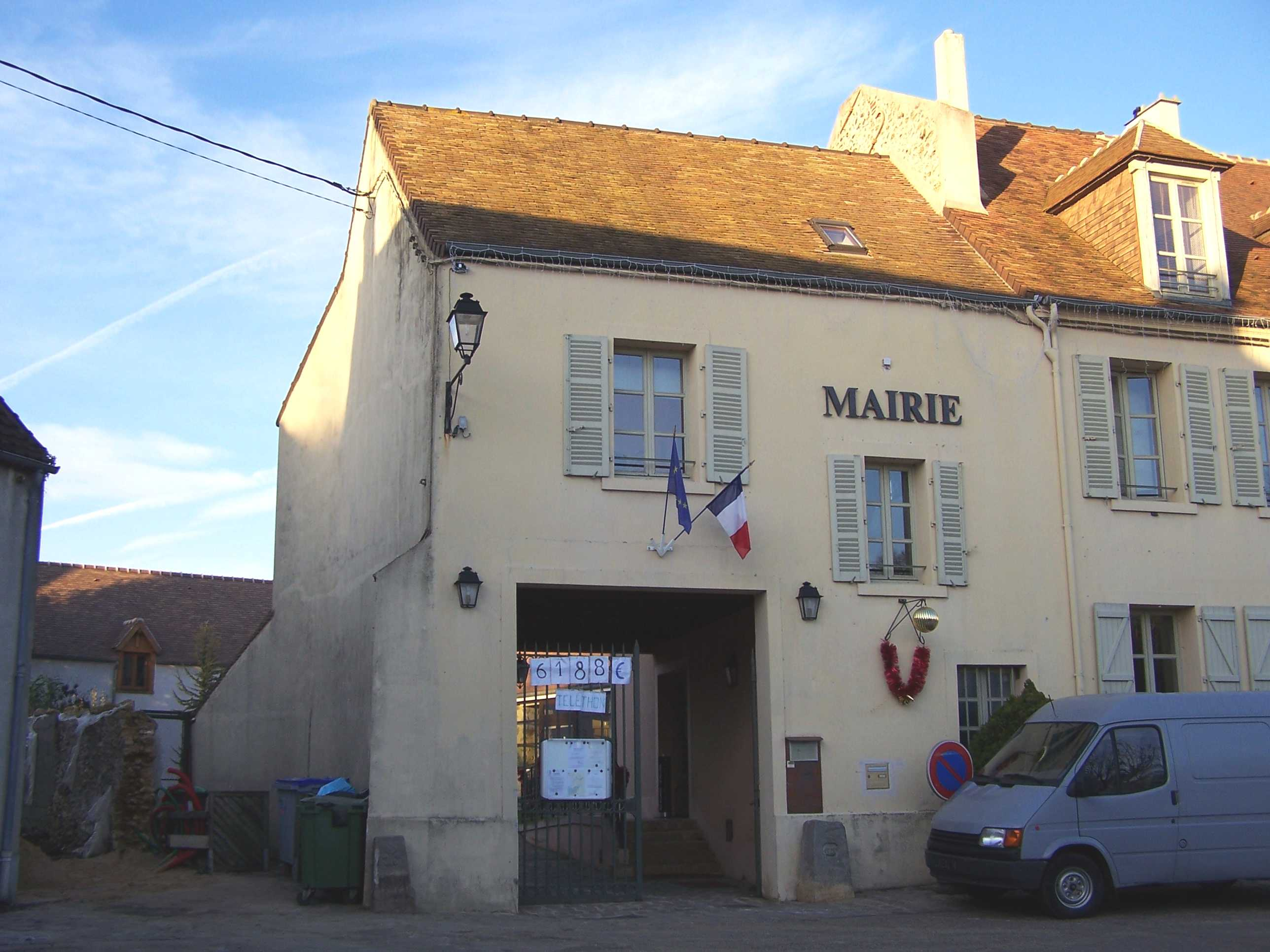
- Town hall

- Coat of arms
- Location of Châteaufort
- Location within France Location within Île-de-France (region)
- Coordinates: 48°43′56″N 2°05′32″E
- Country: France
- Region: Île-de-France
- Department: Yvelines
- Arrondissement: Versailles
- Canton: Maurepas
- Intercommunality: CA Versailles Grand Parc

Government
  - Mayor (2020–2026): Patrice Berquet
- Area^{1}: 4.88 km^{2} (1.88 sq mi)
- Elevation: 150 m (490 ft)
- Highest elevation: 164 m (538 ft)
- Lowest elevation: 86 m (282 ft)
- Population (2023): 1,564
  - Density: 320/km^{2} (830/sq mi)
- Time zone: UTC+01:00 (CET)
  - Summer (DST): UTC+02:00 (CEST)
- INSEE/Postal code: 78143 /78117
- ^{1} French Land Register data, which excludes lakes, ponds, glaciers > 1 km^{2} (0.386 sq mi or 247 acres) and river estuaries.

Châteaufort (French pronunciation: [ʃɑtofɔʁ]) is a commune in the Yvelines department in Île-de-France in north-central France. It is located 9 km (5.6 mi) south of Versailles, and 27 km (17 mi) southwest of Paris.

Châteaufort inhabitants are named Castelfortain.

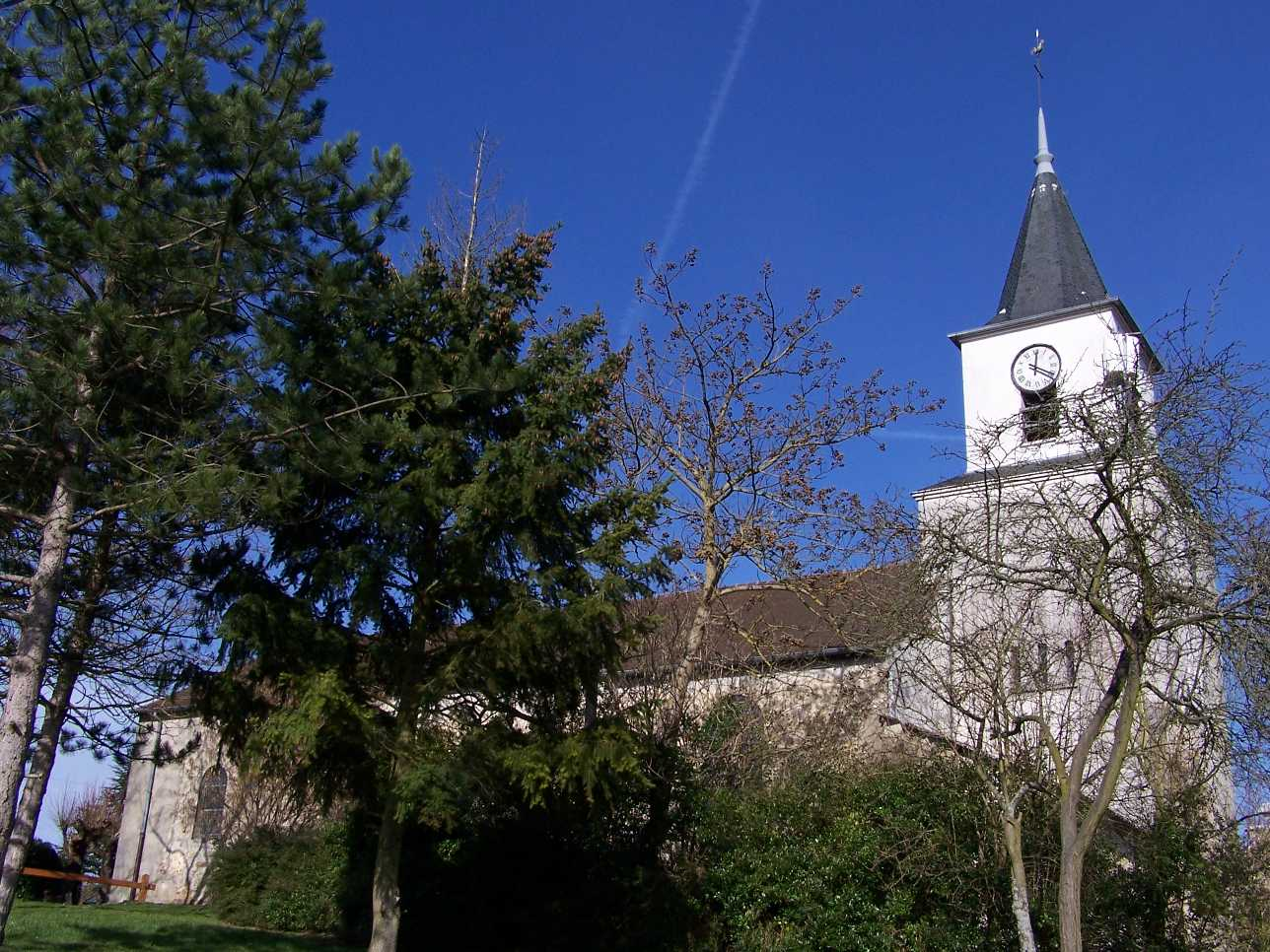
Saint-Christophe

The commune is named after the existence of three fortified castles during the Middle Ages; indeed, château fort means "fortified castle" in French.

On August 19, 1913, ahead of the Châteaufort aerodrome, the French aviator Adolphe Pégoud became the first man to jump from a plane using a parachute. The jump was made from a Blériot plane 200 m above the ground.

In the 20th century, Farman Aviation Works was headquartered in Châteaufort.

== See also ==
- Communes of the Yvelines department
