= Maurepas, Yvelines =

Maurepas
- Commune
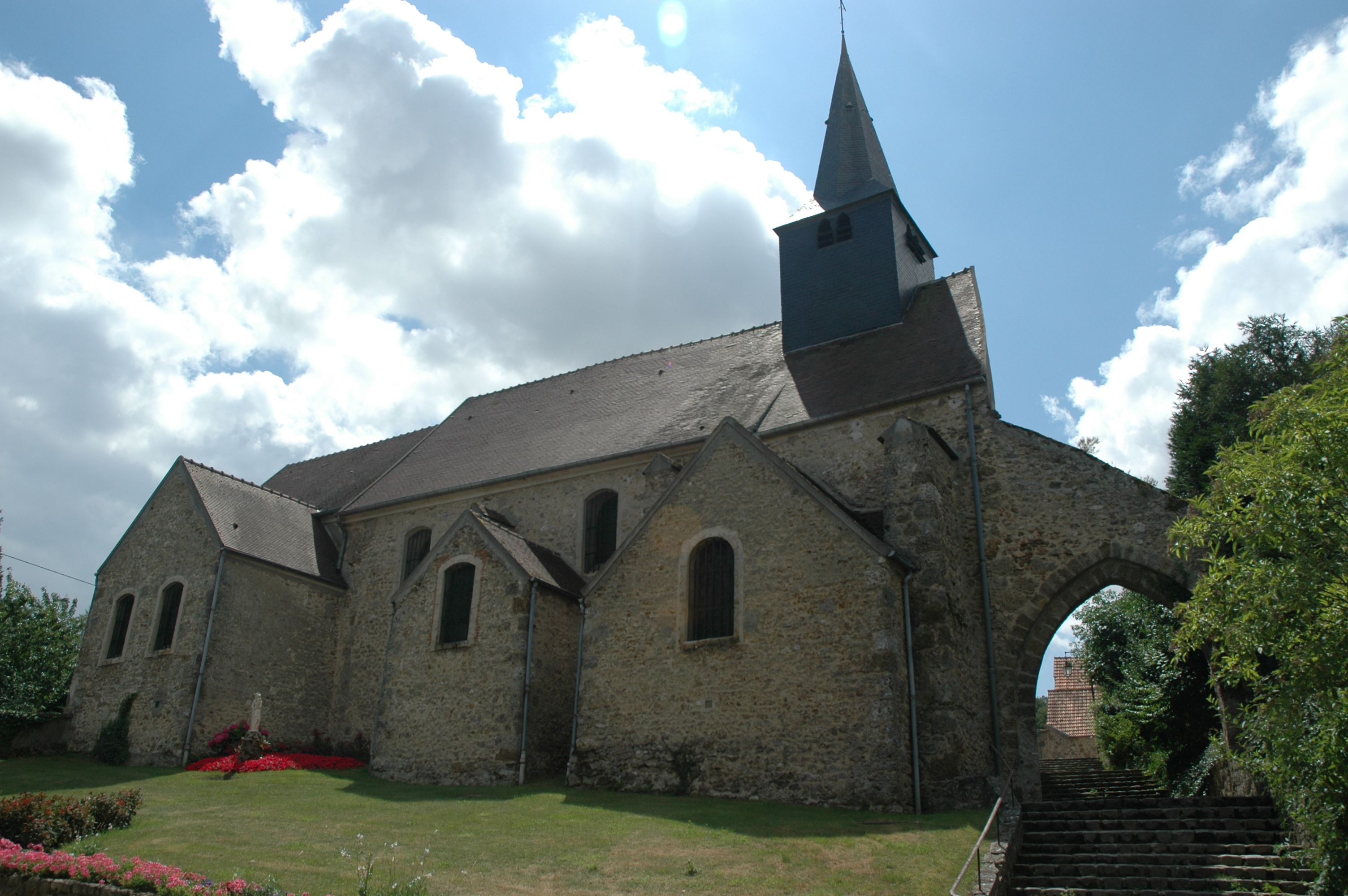
- The church of Saint-Sauveur, in Maurepas

- Coat of arms

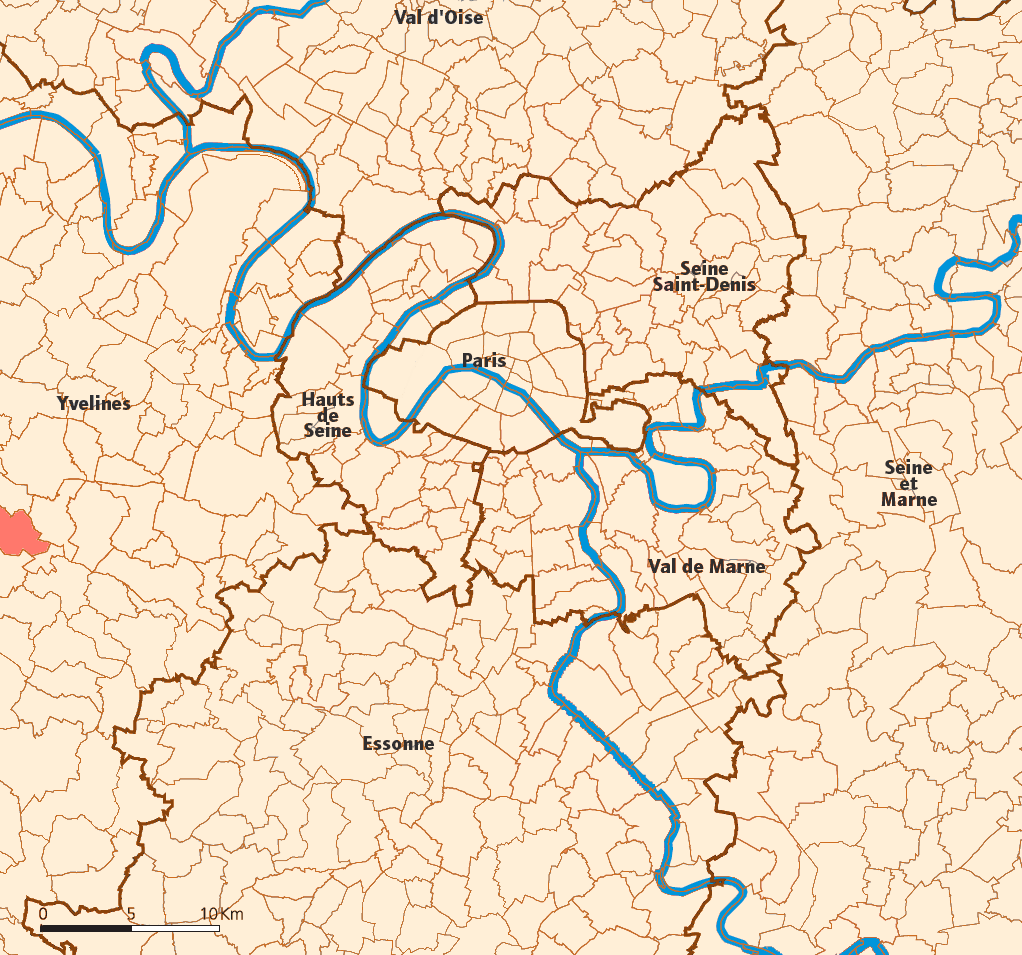
- Location (in red) within Paris inner and outer suburbs
- Location of Maurepas
- Location within France Location within Île-de-France (region)
- Coordinates: 48°46′N 1°57′E
- Country: France
- Region: Île-de-France
- Department: Yvelines
- Arrondissement: Rambouillet
- Canton: Maurepas
- Intercommunality: Saint-Quentin-en-Yvelines

Government
  - Mayor (2020–2026): Grégory Garestier
- Area^{1}: 8.32 km^{2} (3.21 sq mi)
- Highest elevation: 178 m (584 ft)
- Lowest elevation: 87 m (285 ft)
- Population (2023): 20,629
  - Density: 2,480/km^{2} (6,420/sq mi)
- Time zone: UTC+01:00 (CET)
  - Summer (DST): UTC+02:00 (CEST)
- INSEE/Postal code: 78383 /78310
- ^{1} French Land Register data, which excludes lakes, ponds, glaciers > 1 km^{2} (0.386 sq mi or 247 acres) and river estuaries.

Maurepas (French pronunciation: [moʁpa]) is a commune in the Yvelines department in the Île-de-France region in north-central France. It is in the western suburbs of Paris 31.2 km (19.4 mi) from the center.

== History ==
The most ancient building is the ruined Donjon de Maurepas, built in the 11th century and destroyed in 1425. St Sauveur's church dates from the 15th century.

In 768, the French king Pepin the Short offered the village of Maurepas (formerly spelled Malrepast) and its wooden keep to the Abbey of Saint-Denis. Facing the Normans' invasions, they left the domain to the Lords of Chevreuse. The castle and village were given to the family of Malrepast, a vassal of the Lords of Chevreuse, which gave its name to the village.

In 1432, during the Hundred Years' War, the English conquered the village and destroyed the keep. After the war, the domain of Maurepas returned to the family of Chevreuse, but the castle remained a ruin.

Jean-Frédéric Phélypeaux from the Phélypeaux family, was Count of Maurepas. He was living in the next city of Jouars-Pontchartrain in the Château de Pontchartrain.

The Hôtel de Ville was completed in 1973.

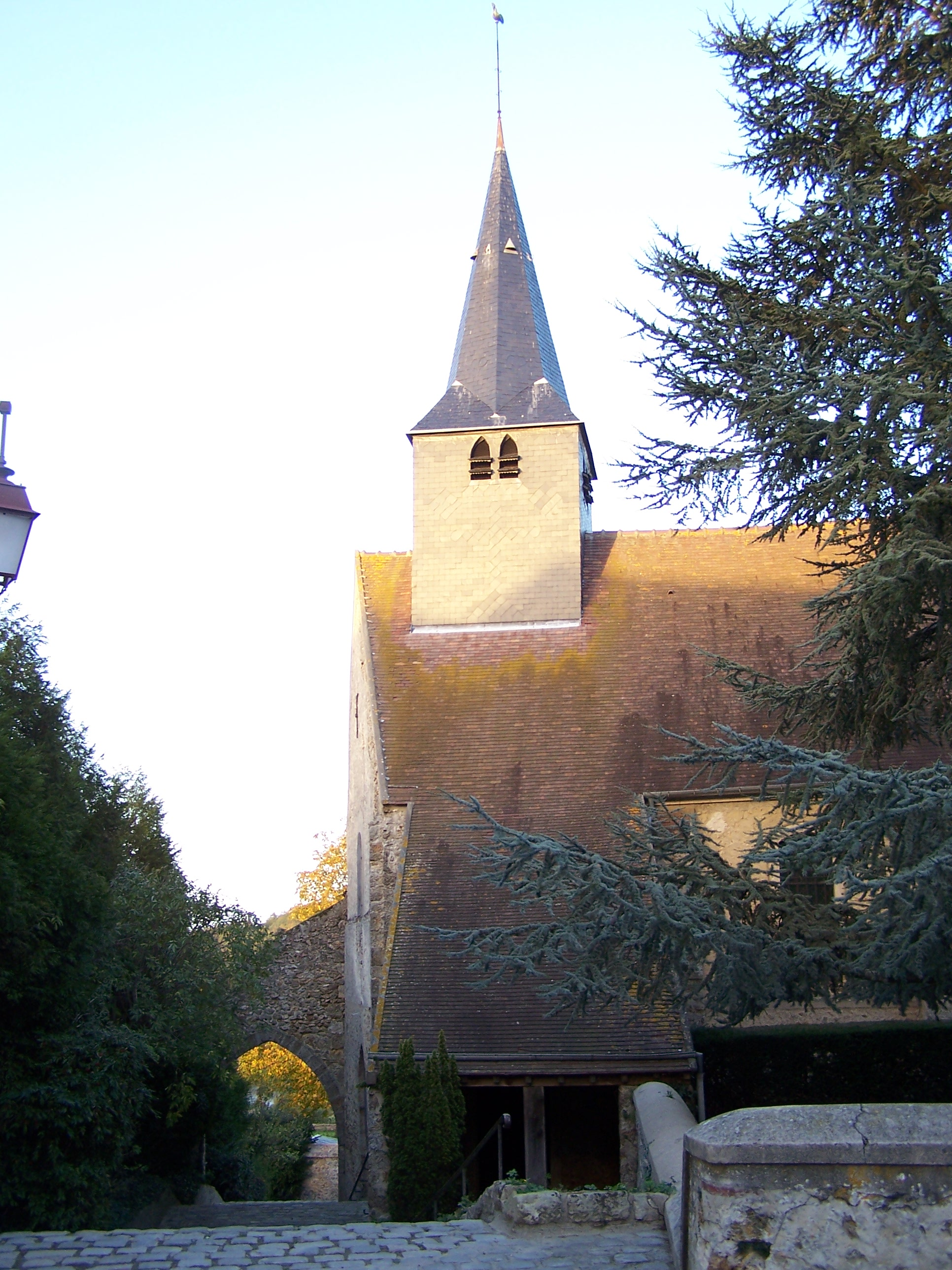
Entrance of church Saint-Sauveur.

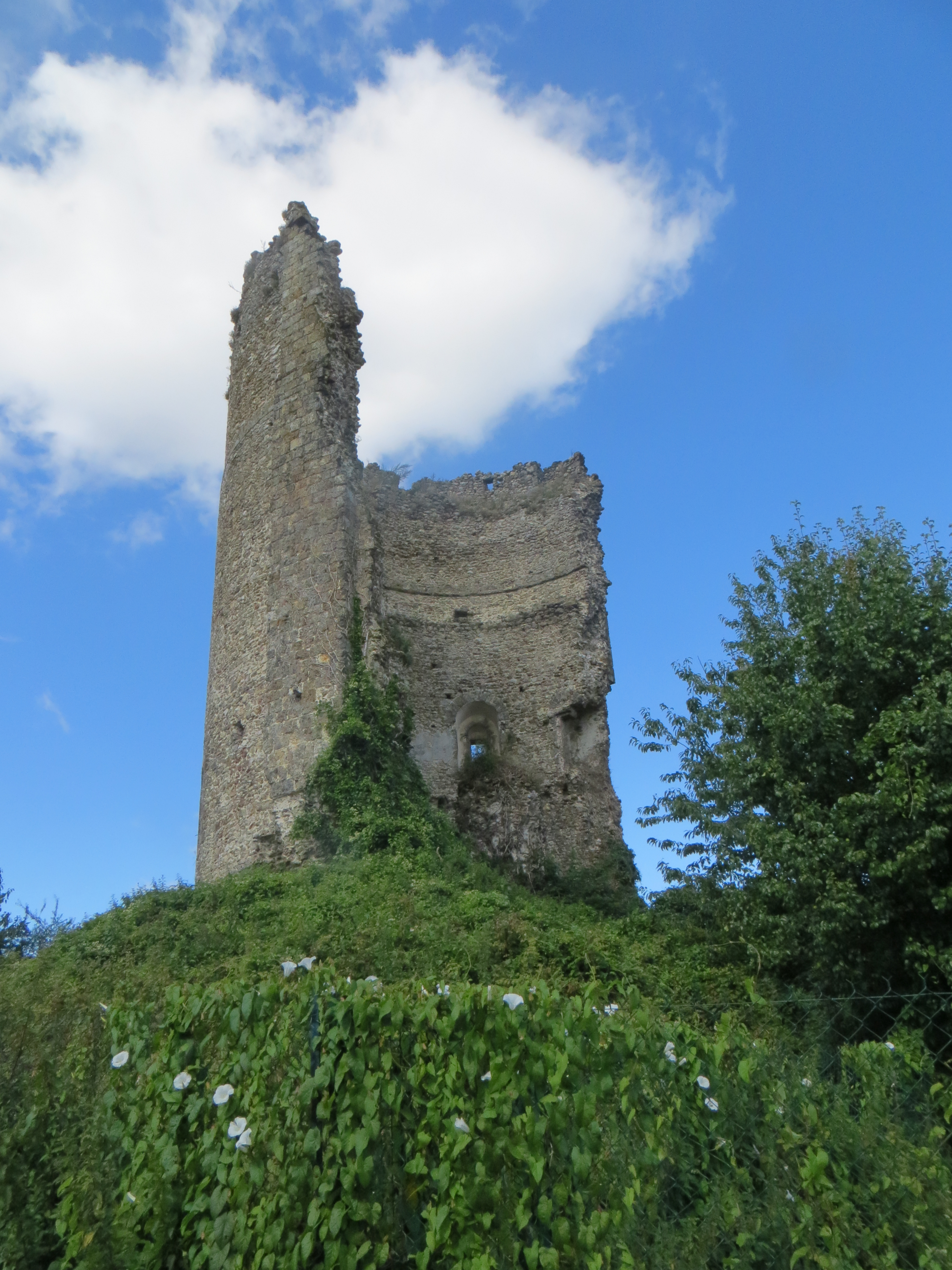
The ruins of the donjon.

The Hôtel de Ville

== Transportation ==
Maurepas is served by no station of the Paris Métro, RER, or suburban rail network. The closest station to Maurepas is La Verrière station on the Transilien Line U and Transilien Line N suburban rail lines. This station is located in the neighboring commune of La Verrière, 0.7 km (0.43 mi) from the town center of Maurepas.

== Demography ==
Historical population

Year	Pop.	±% p.a.
1793	247	—
1821	272	+0.34%
1846	311	+0.54%
1872	242	−0.96%
1901	226	−0.24%
1926	300	+1.14%
1946	325	+0.40%
1962	352	+0.50%
1968	1,791	+31.15%

Year	Pop.	±% p.a.
1975	13,577	+33.56%
1982	18,764	+4.73%
1990	19,718	+0.62%
1999	19,586	−0.07%
2007	18,789	−0.52%
2012	18,907	+0.13%
2017	18,281	−0.67%
2023	20,629	+2.03%

Source: EHESS and INSEE

== Education ==
Junior high schools:

- Collège Alexandre Dumas
- Collège Louis Pergaud
- Collège de la Mare aux Saules in nearby Coignières

Senior high schools/sixth-form colleges:

- Lycée des 7 Mares
- Lycée Dumont d'Urville

== Notable residents ==
- Erich von Stroheim - (1885–1957), Austrian-American actor, film director, producer born in Vienna, Austria, died at his home in Maurepas.

== Twin towns ==
It is twinned with Waterlooville in Hampshire, and Tirat Carmel in Haifa district, Israel.

== See also ==
- Communes of the Yvelines department
