= Saint-Forget =

- Commune
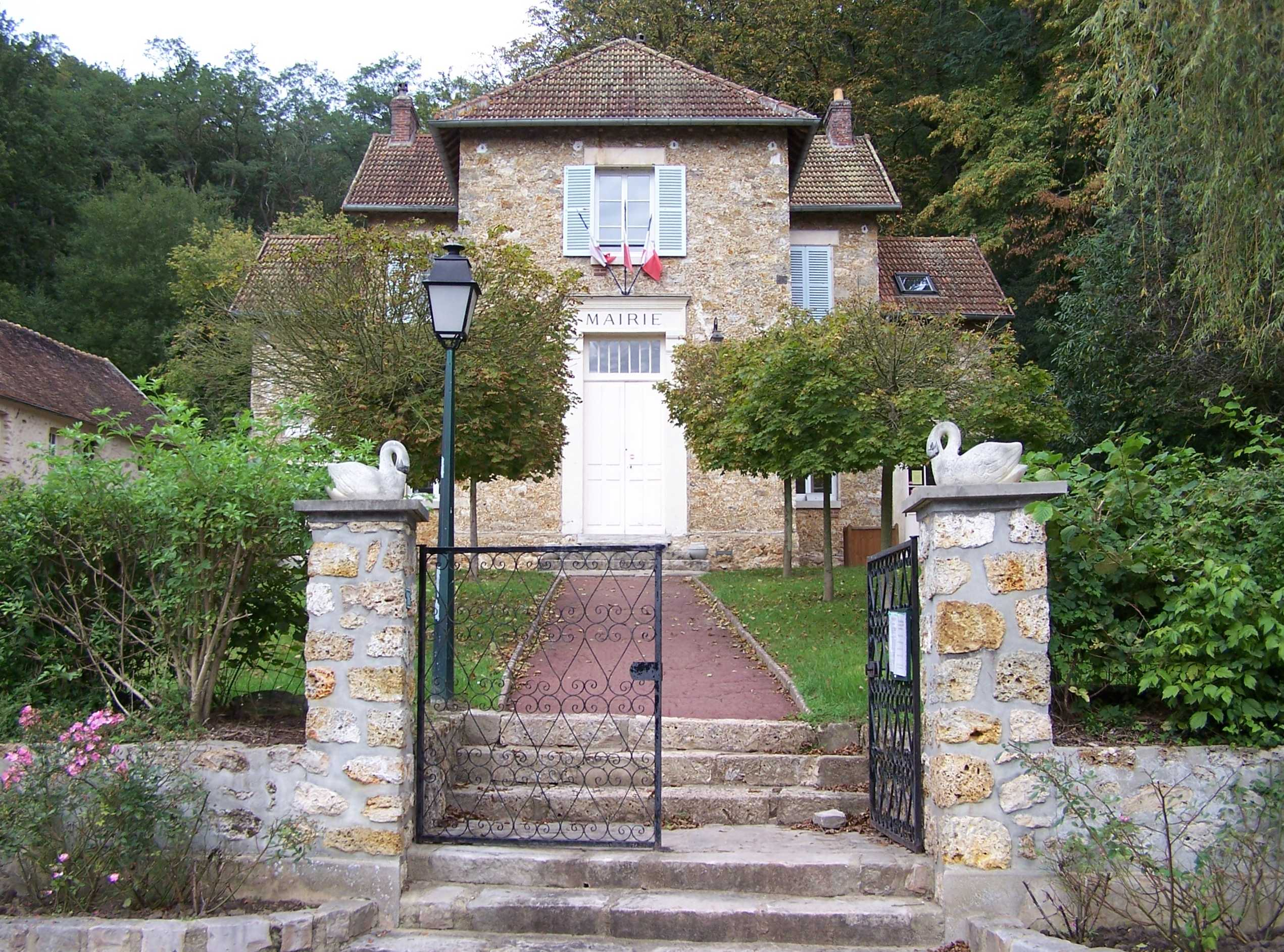
- Town hall
- Location of Saint-Forget
- Location within France Location within Île-de-France (region)
- Coordinates: 48°42′30″N 1°59′49″E
- Country: France
- Region: Île-de-France
- Department: Yvelines
- Arrondissement: Rambouillet
- Canton: Maurepas

Government
  - Mayor (2020–2026): Jean-Luc Jannin
- Area^{1}: 6 km^{2} (2.3 sq mi)
- Elevation: 165 m (541 ft)
- Highest elevation: 168 m (551 ft)
- Lowest elevation: 77 m (253 ft)
- Population (2023): 436
  - Density: 73/km^{2} (190/sq mi)
- Time zone: UTC+01:00 (CET)
  - Summer (DST): UTC+02:00 (CEST)
- INSEE/Postal code: 78548 /78720
- ^{1} French Land Register data, which excludes lakes, ponds, glaciers > 1 km^{2} (0.386 sq mi or 247 acres) and river estuaries.

Saint-Forget (French pronunciation: [sɛ̃ fɔʁʒɛ]) is a commune in the Yvelines department in the Île-de-France region in north-central France. The commune consists of three hamlets: Le Mesnil-Sevin, Haute-Beauce, and The Sablons. This small town is 30 kilometers from Paris. It is nestled in the heart of the Regional Natural Park of the Upper Chevreuse Valley. As of 2019, there are 241 dwellings in the commune, of which 202 primary residences.

The commune contains a small town hall that currently offers tours and/or visits. This small commune also includes many sites of interest for a small tour, including the Castle of Mauvières and the Saint Gilles Saint Ferréol church, which includes medieval frescoes. The castle, which used to be a manor, dates back to the 17th and 18th centuries.

== Hamlets ==
The commune located in Yvelines consists of three hamlets, or small settlements, that make up the majority of this small community.

- Mesnil-Sevin
  - This hamlet is located on a plateau between Le Mesnil Saint Denis and Chevreuse.
- Haute-Beauce
  - This hamlet is almost adjacent to Dampierre-en-Yvelines, where the town hall is located. This area is more building-dense, with small roads throughout.
- The Sablons
  - The Castle of Mauvières is located in this area, which is on the departmental 58 between Dampierre-en-Yvelines and Chevreuse. Also located here is the church of St. Gilles.

== See also ==
- Communes of the Yvelines department
