= Canton of Maurepas =

Coordinates: 48.76°N 1.94°E

The canton of Maurepas is an administrative division of the Yvelines department, northern France. Its borders were modified at the French canton reorganisation which came into effect in March 2015. Its seat is in Maurepas.

It consists of the following communes:

1. Châteaufort
2. Chevreuse
3. Choisel
4. Coignières
5. Dampierre-en-Yvelines
6. Lévis-Saint-Nom
7. Magny-les-Hameaux
8. Maurepas
9. Le Mesnil-Saint-Denis
10. Milon-la-Chapelle
11. Saint-Forget
12. Saint-Lambert
13. Saint-Rémy-lès-Chevreuse
14. Senlisse
15. Toussus-le-Noble
16. Voisins-le-Bretonneux
