= La Verrière =

- Commune
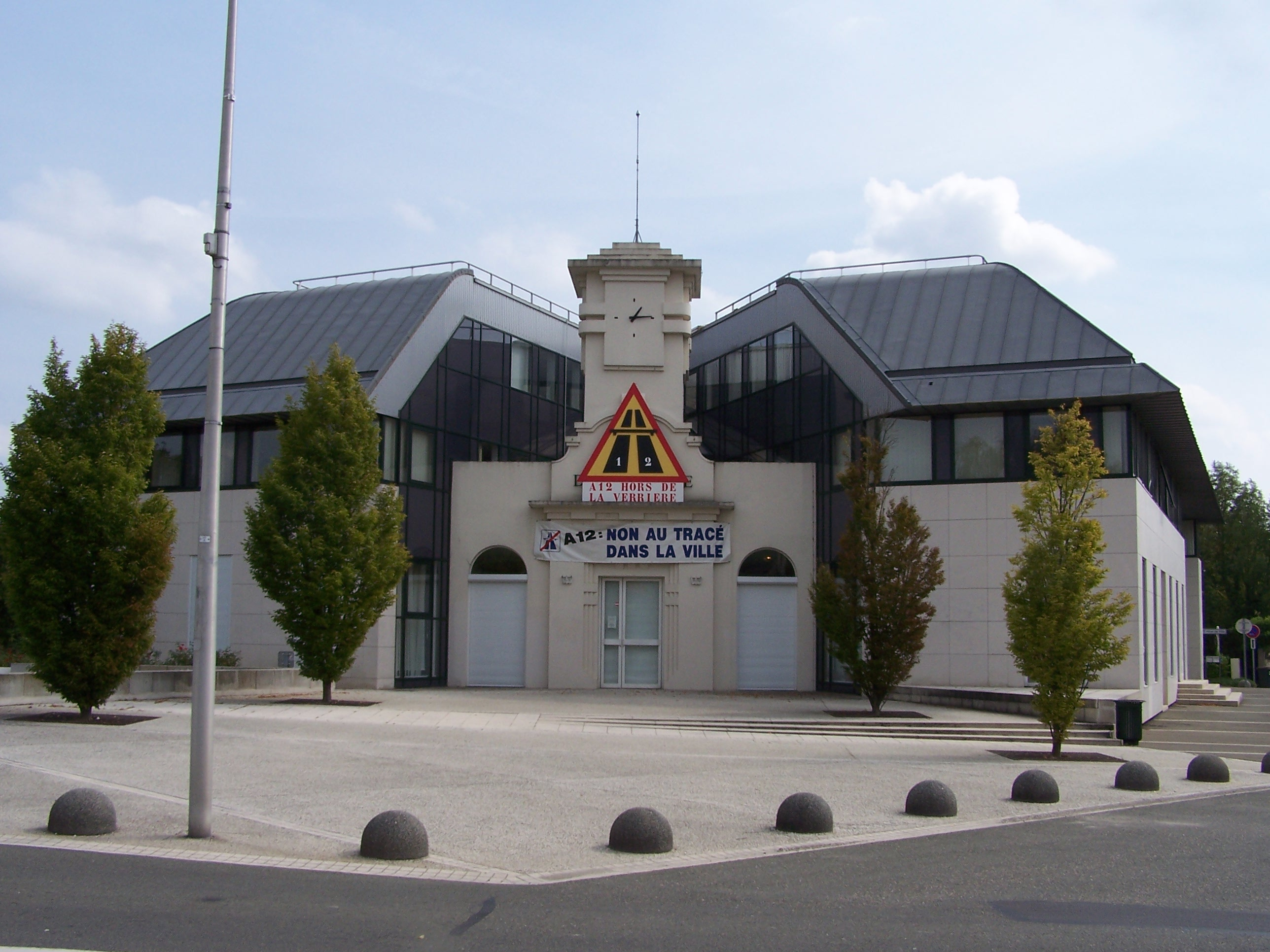
- Town hall

- Coat of arms
- Location of La Verrière
- Location within France Location within Île-de-France (region)
- Coordinates: 48°45′33″N 1°57′47″E
- Country: France
- Region: Île-de-France
- Department: Yvelines
- Arrondissement: Rambouillet
- Canton: Trappes
- Intercommunality: Saint-Quentin-en-Yvelines

Government
  - Mayor (2020–2026): Nicolas Dainville
- Area^{1}: 1.77 km^{2} (0.68 sq mi)
- Elevation: 169 m (554 ft)
- Highest elevation: 175 m (574 ft)
- Lowest elevation: 166 m (545 ft)
- Population (2023): 5,994
  - Density: 3,390/km^{2} (8,770/sq mi)
- Time zone: UTC+01:00 (CET)
  - Summer (DST): UTC+02:00 (CEST)
- INSEE/Postal code: 78644 /78320
- ^{1} French Land Register data, which excludes lakes, ponds, glaciers > 1 km^{2} (0.386 sq mi or 247 acres) and river estuaries.

La Verrière (French pronunciation: [la vɛʁjɛʁ]) is a commune in the Yvelines department in the Île-de-France in north-central France.

== Population ==
Historical population
Year	Pop.	±% p.a.
1968	2,868	—
1975	6,219	+11.69%
1982	6,674	+1.01%
1990	6,187	−0.94%
1999	6,053	−0.24%
2007	6,125	+0.15%
2012	5,962	−0.54%
2017	6,715	+2.41%
2023	5,994	−1.88%
Source: INSEE

== Transport ==
La Verrière station is served by Transilien trains to Paris and Rambouillet.

== Public Housing ==
Built in the 1970s to house employees of the Renault factory in Boulogne-Billancourt, Hauts-de-Seine, the housing project in the Bois de l'Etang district will be partially demolished and completely rehabilitated in the coming years, including the demolition of three social housing blocks.

== Education ==
Preschools and elementary schools in La Verrière:

- École du Parc
- École régionale
- École du Bois de l’Étang

Preschools:

- École des Noës

Collège intercommunal Philippe de Champaigne in Le Mesnil-Saint-Denis serves the junior high school students of La Verrière.

Area senior high schools/sixth form colleges are located in other communes:

- Lycée Dumont d’Urville Elancourt-Maurepas, Maurepas
- Lycée des Sept-Mares, Maurepas
- Lycée de la Plaine de Neauphle, Trappes
- Lycée d’Enseignement Professionnel Industriel Louis Blériot, Trappes

Versailles Saint-Quentin-en-Yvelines University provides tertiary educational services.

== See also ==
- Communes of the Yvelines department
