= Trappes station =

Railway station in Trappes, France

Trappes
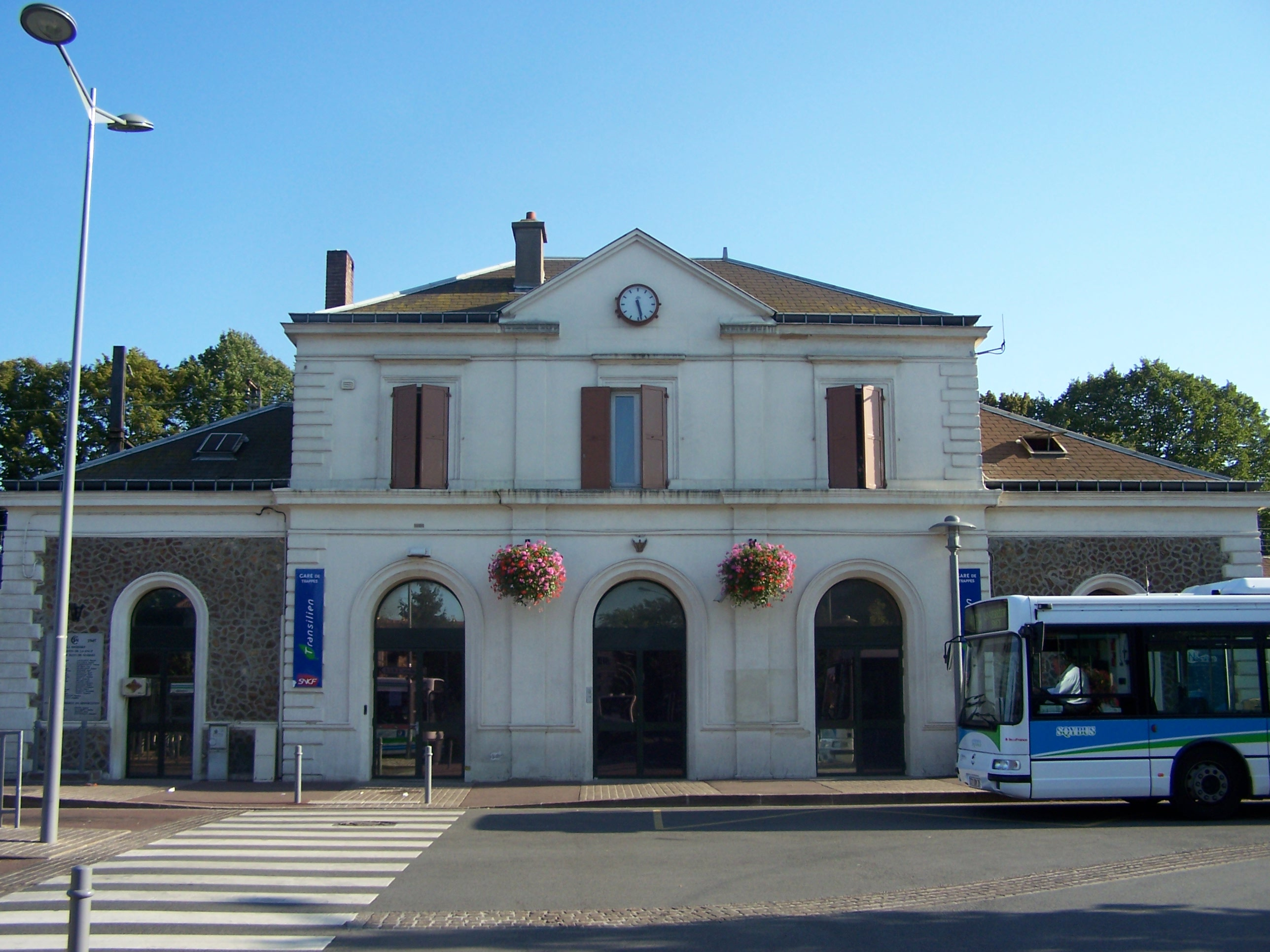

General information
- Location: France
- Coordinates: 48°46′30″N 2°00′24″E
- Operator: Transilien
- Lines: Transilien Line N (Paris-Montparnasse) Transilien Line U

Other information
- Station code: 87393835
- Fare zone: 5

History
- Opened: 12 July 1849

Passengers
- 2024: 4,260,564

Services
Preceding station	Transilien	Following station
La Verrière towards Rambouillet	Line N	Saint-Quentin-en-Yvelines towards Paris–Montparnasse
La Verrière Terminus	Line U	Saint-Quentin-en-Yvelines towards La Défense
Location

Trappes is a station on the Paris–Brest railway. It is served by suburban Transilien Line N and U services. The station opened on 12 July 1849. It is within Trappes.

== See also ==
- List of stations of the Paris RER
