= Donjon de Maurepas =

Ruins of a mediaeval castle in Yvelines, France

Coordinates: 48°46′21.4″N 1°55′14.3″E

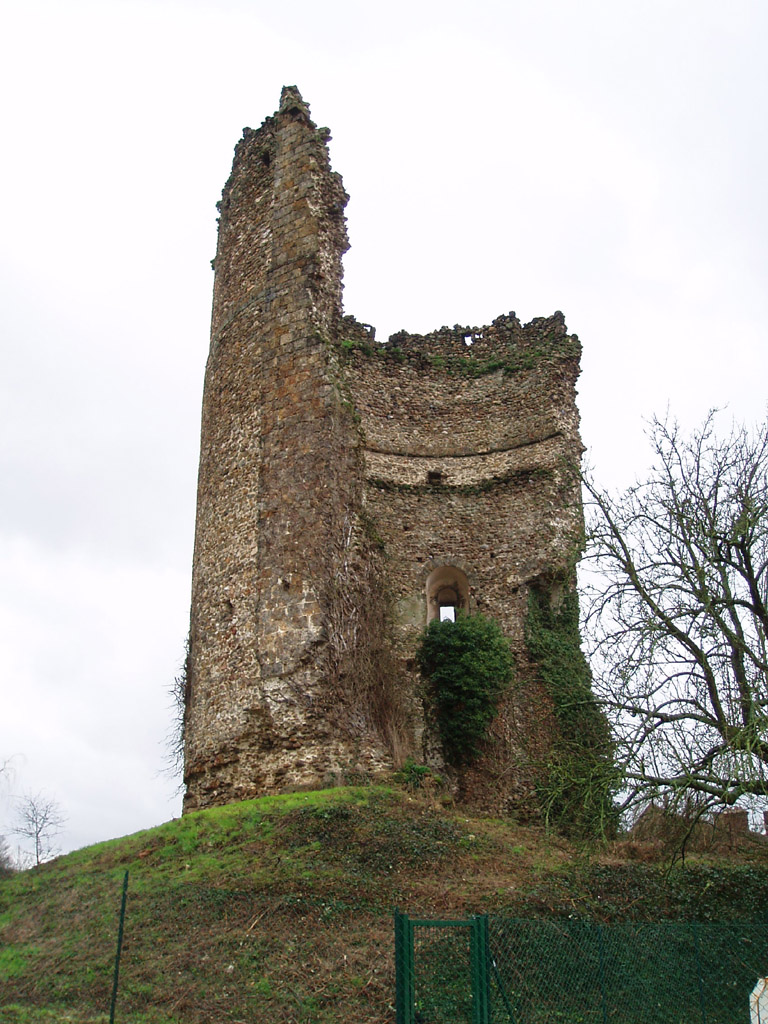
The keep of Maurepas

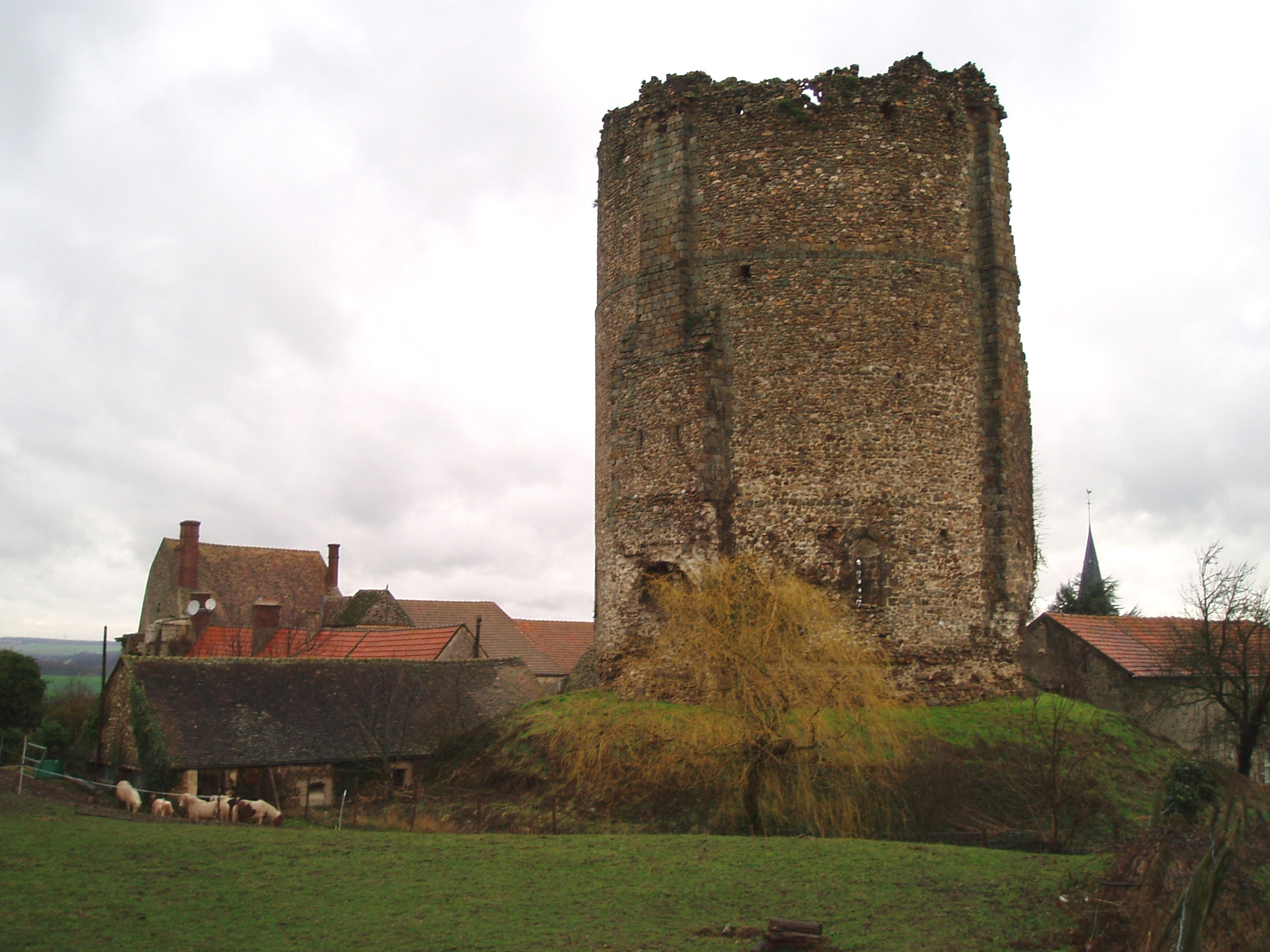
The keep of Maurepas

The Donjon de Maurepas is a ruined medieval castle in the town of Maurepas, in the French département of Yvelines (Île de France).

== History ==
Since the 8th century, the village of Maurepas (formerly spelled Malrepast) belonged to the Abbey of Saint-Denis. Facing the Normans' invasions, they left the domain to the Lords of Chevreuse; the castle was given to the family of Malrepast. A wooden keep was replaced by a stronger castle.

During the Hundred Years' War, the Lords of Malrepast abandoned the castle. It was then used as a haunt by a band of plunderers. In 1425, the English captured and hung all the occupants of the castle.

The castle was then occupied by Aymon de Massy.

In 1432, the English conquered the area and dismantled the castle.

After the war, the domain of Maurepas returned to the family of Chevreuse, but the castle remained a ruin.

Today, only the keep, which is 20 m (66 ft) high, remains on a low motte. A farm leans on the ruins.

The keep has been listed by the French Ministry of Culture as a monument historique since 1926.

== See also ==
- List of castles in France
