= Le Mesnil-Saint-Denis =

- Commune
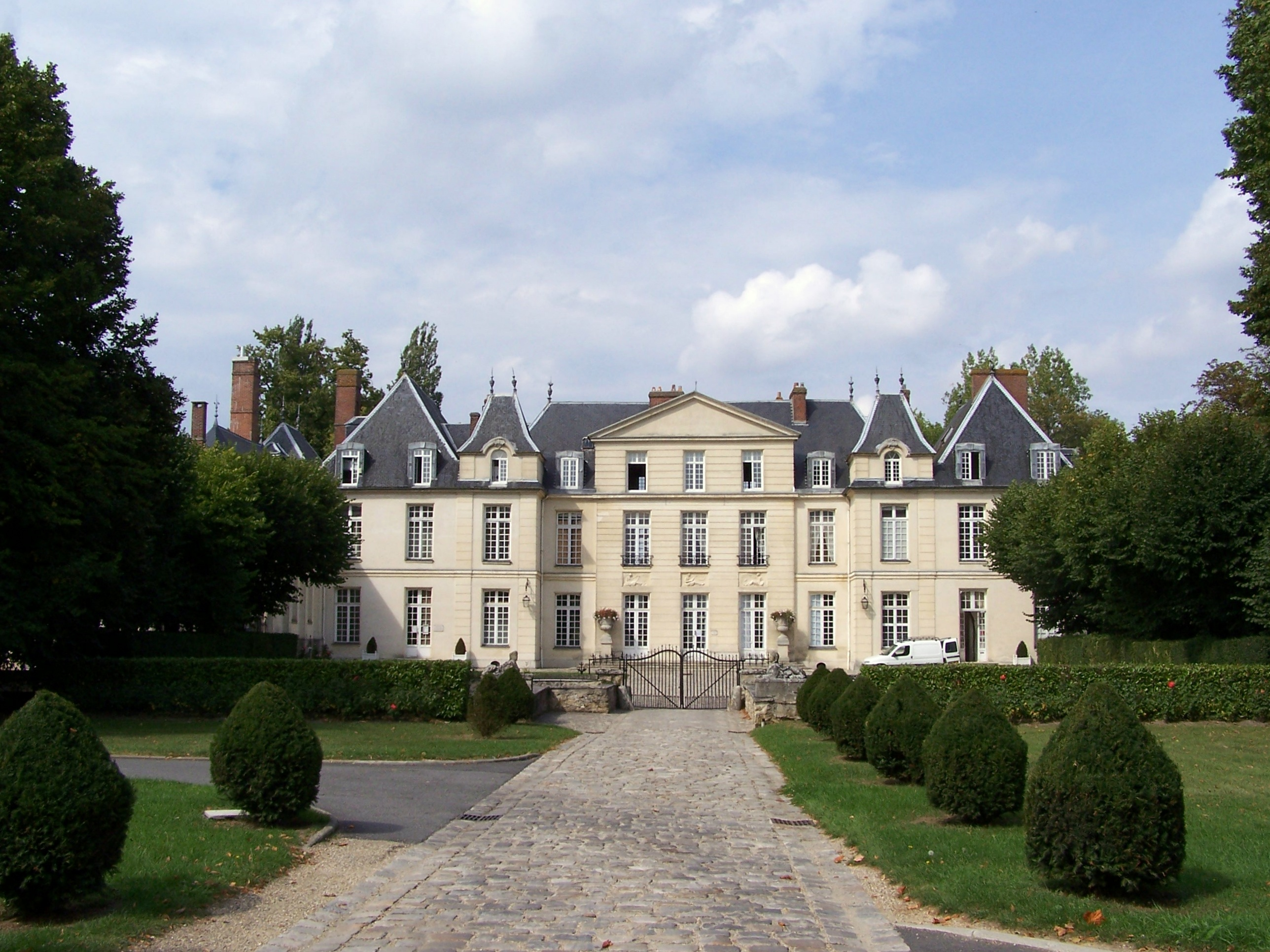
- Town hall

- Coat of arms
- Location of Le Mesnil-Saint-Denis
- Location within France Location within Île-de-France (region)
- Coordinates: 48°44′39″N 1°57′50″E
- Country: France
- Region: Île-de-France
- Department: Yvelines
- Arrondissement: Rambouillet
- Canton: Maurepas

Government
  - Mayor (2020–2026): Christophe Buhot
- Area^{1}: 8.95 km^{2} (3.46 sq mi)
- Elevation: 168 m (551 ft)
- Highest elevation: 177 m (581 ft)
- Lowest elevation: 120 m (390 ft)
- Population (2023): 7,276
  - Density: 813/km^{2} (2,110/sq mi)
- Time zone: UTC+01:00 (CET)
  - Summer (DST): UTC+02:00 (CEST)
- INSEE/Postal code: 78397 /78320
- ^{1} French Land Register data, which excludes lakes, ponds, glaciers > 1 km^{2} (0.386 sq mi or 247 acres) and river estuaries.

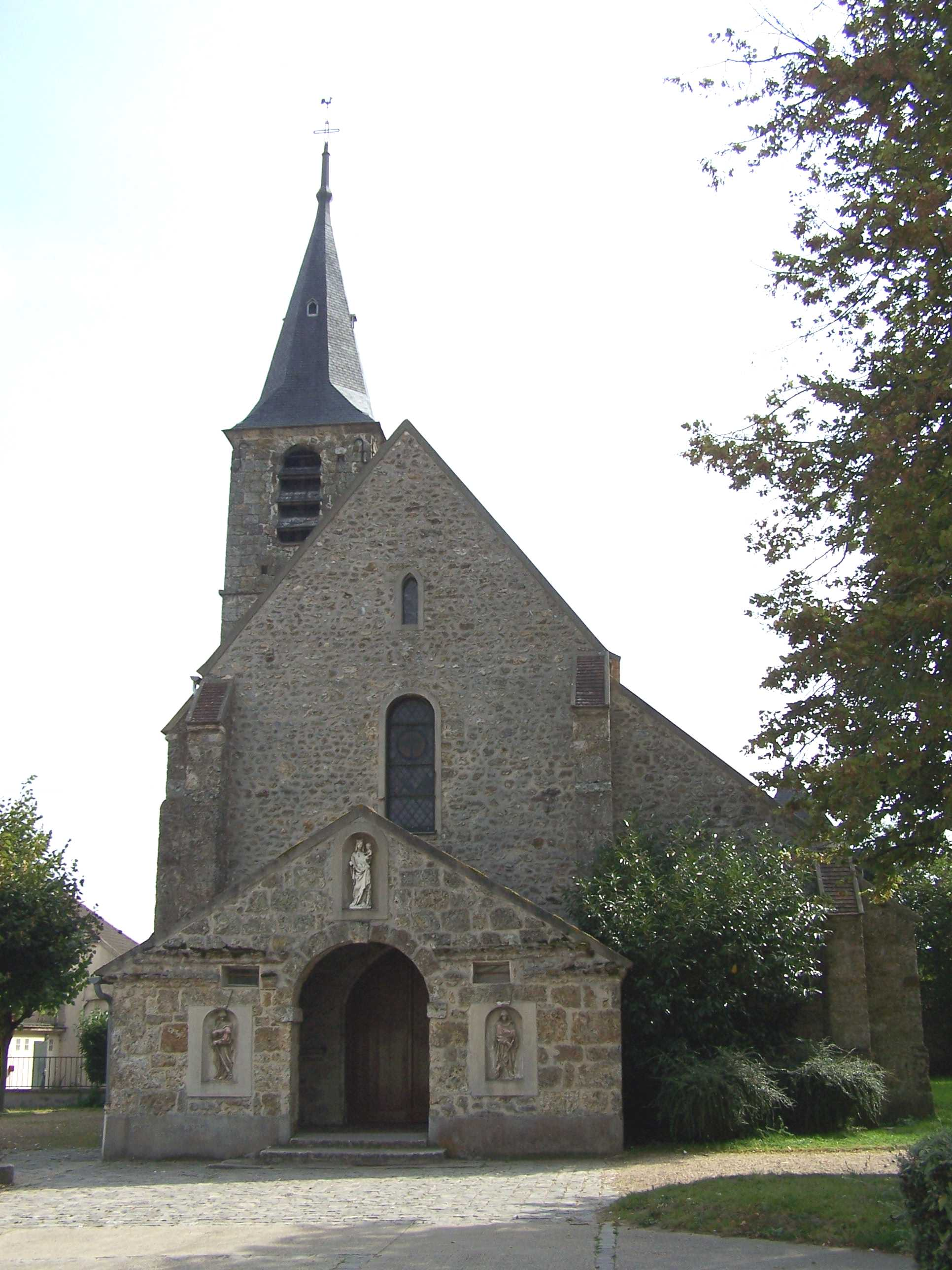
The church

Le Mesnil-Saint-Denis (French pronunciation: [lə menil sɛ̃ dəni]) is a commune in the Yvelines department in the Île-de-France region in north-central France.

== Demographics ==
Historical population

Year	Pop.	±% p.a.
1793	474	—
1821	491	+0.13%
1846	534	+0.34%
1872	498	−0.27%
1901	670	+1.03%
1926	633	−0.23%
1946	1,046	+2.54%
1954	1,161	+1.31%
1962	1,727	+5.09%

Year	Pop.	±% p.a.
1968	4,061	+15.32%
1975	5,381	+4.10%
1982	6,594	+2.95%
1990	6,528	−0.13%
1999	6,518	−0.02%
2007	6,622	+0.20%
2012	6,593	−0.09%
2017	6,789	+0.59%
2023	7,276	+1.16%

Source: EHESS and INSEE (1968-2023)

== Schools ==
The commune has two public preschools, Maternelle de Champmesnil and Maternelle du Bois du Fay, as well as two public elementary schools, Élémentaire de Champmesnil and Élémentaire du Bois du Fay. It also hosts two junior high schools, the public Collège Philippe de Champaigne and the private Collège privé Saint Thérèse. Collège Philippe de Champaigne also serves residents of La Verrière.

== Twin towns ==
- Hankensbüttel, Germany since 1983

== See also ==
- Communes of the Yvelines department
