= Europcar =

French car rental company

- Type: Subsidiary
- ISIN: FR0012789949
- Industry: Car rental
- Founded: Paris, France (1949)
- Founder: Raoul-Louis Mattei
- Headquarters: France
- Area served: Worldwide
- Key people: Sebastian Birkel (Group CEO)
- Revenue: ▲€2.929 billion (2018)
- Operating income: ▲€363 million (2018)
- Net income: ▲€139 million (2018)
- Total assets: ▲€6.495 billion (2018)
- Owner: Green Mobility Holding S.A.
- Number of employees: 8,999 (2018)
- Website: europcar.com europcar-mobility-group.com

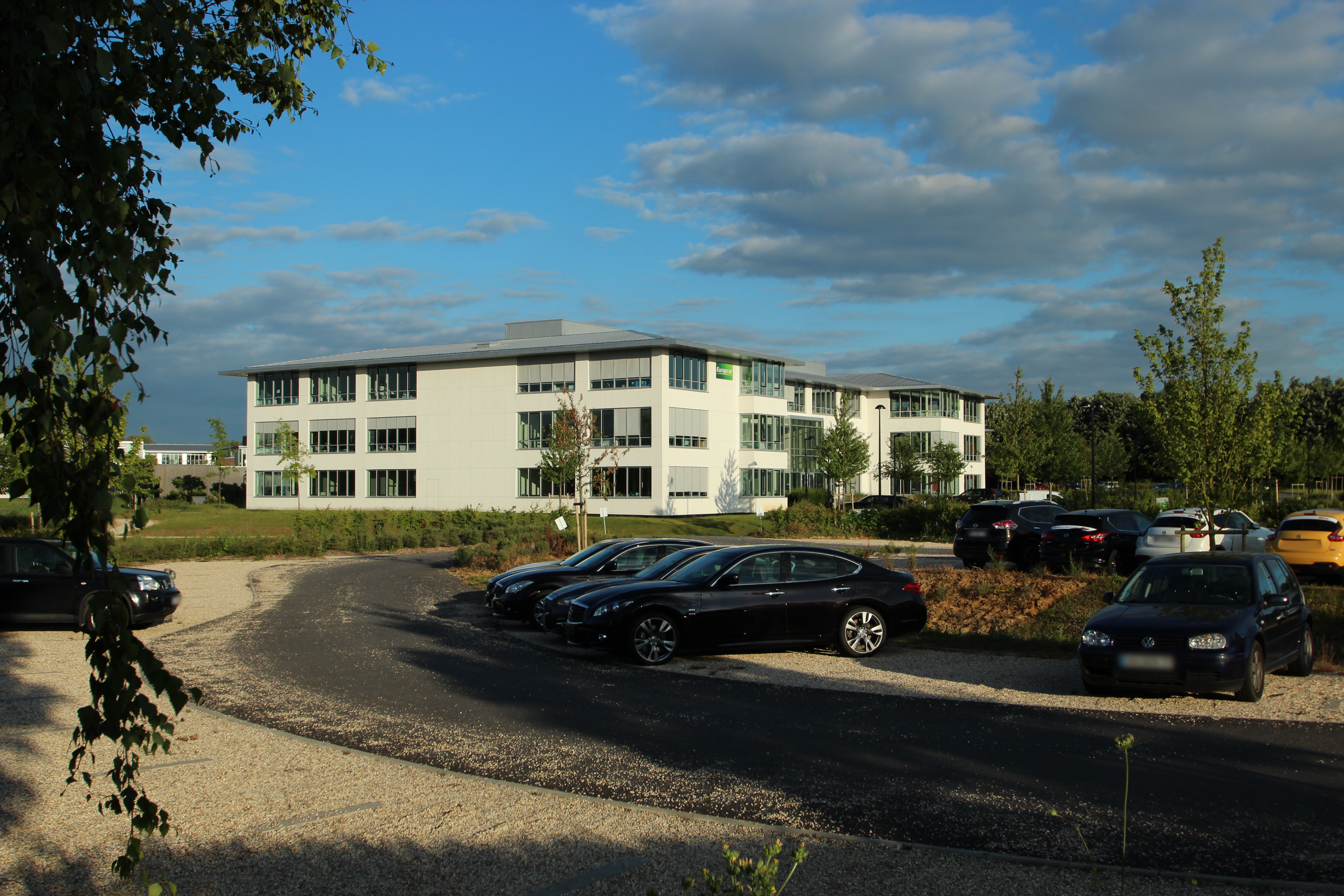
Europcar former head office in Voisins-le-Bretonneux, France, June 2015

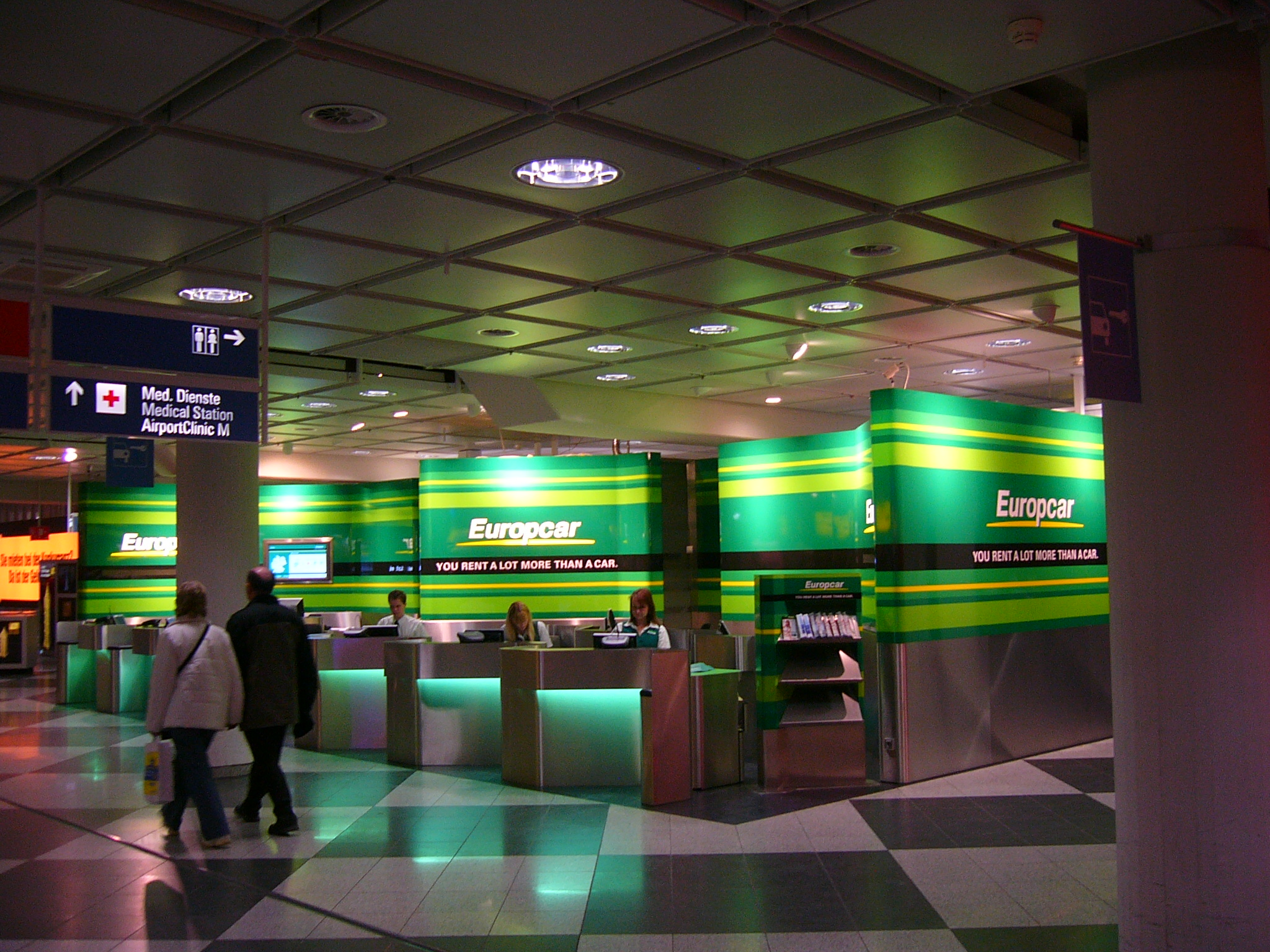
Europcar counters at Munich Airport-Franz Josef Strauß, January 2007

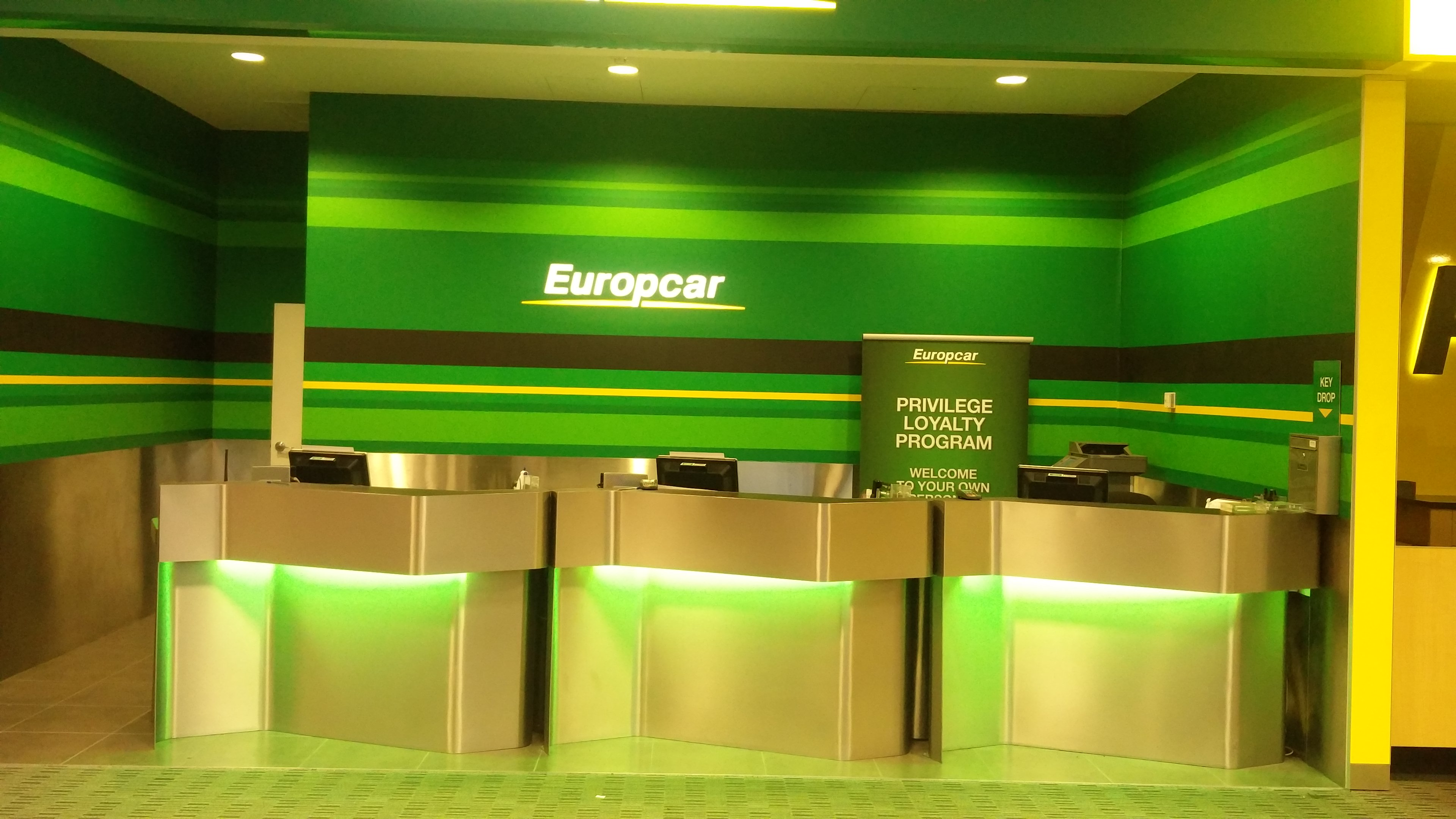
Europcar office in the Christchurch Airport, Christchurch, New Zealand, January 2017

Europcar Mobility Group is a French car rental company founded in 1949 in Paris. The head office of the holding company, Europcar Group S.A., is in the business park of Val Saint-Quentin at Voisins-le-Bretonneux (Saint-Quentin-en-Yvelines), France. Europcar currently operates in 140 countries covering Europe, North America, Western Asia, and Africa. Since July 2022, Europcar has been owned by Green Mobility Holding, S.A., a consortium led by the Volkswagen Group, Attestor, and Pon Holdings. Keddy is the Europcar leisure rental sub-brand.

== History ==
=== Early stages ===
Europcar Mobility Group was founded in 1949 in Paris by Raoul-Louis Mattei under the name of "The Automobile Subscription". The "Europcars" brand was created in 1951. After 20 years of growth the company was owned from 1970 to 1988 by Renault, the Compagnie Internationale des Wagons-Lits, and Accor.

=== Volkswagen subsidiary ===
From 1998, Europcar had progressively been acquired by the Volkswagen Group, until it eventually became a subsidiary 100% owned by the carmaker in 1999.

=== Buy-back by Eurazeo ===
In 2006, Eurazeo, the investment company, bought Europcar from the Volkswagen Group. The amount of the transaction was worth 2.4 times Europcar's turnover in 2005. The chairman of the Board of Eurazeo, Patrick Sayer, said, "We are thrilled by the acquisition of Europcar. With an initial participation of 900 million euros, it is due to become of the most significant investments for Eurazeo."

In 2010, the group partnered with Daimler to launch the Car2Go service in Hamburg, Germany. Philippe Germond, who had been CEO of PMU since 2009, was named CEO of Europcar from October 1, 2015. In January 2015, Europcar acquired Ubeeqo, a startup that specialises in corporate carsharing. In May 2015, Europcar announced its intention to go public.

In early 2017, the company announced a trio of acquisitions: Milan based GuidaMi, Europcar Denmark, and Germany based Buchbinder. In December 2017, the company completed its acquisition of low-cost car rental company, Goldcar, for an enterprise value of €550 million ($616 million).

In April 2018, Europcar acquired Scooty, through Ubeeqo, a Belgian start-up that specialises in electric scooter-sharing in Antwerp and Brussels. In June 2018, Europcar ended its operations of its Israeli franchisee in the occupied West Bank. The American Friends Service Committee said, “After becoming a franchisee of Europcar, Israeli company Albar terminated its businesses in the occupied West Bank. Europcar thus joins other multinationals that have ended operations in illegal Israeli settlements”. According to Israeli research centre Who Profits?, Albar previously had branches in two illegal settlements: Beitar Illit and Modi'in Illit.

In August 2019, Europcar acquired Fox Rent A Car, one of the largest independent players in the US car rental market. In 2020, the company filed for Chapter 15 bankruptcy as part of its restructuring process in France.

=== Recent ===
On 28 July 2021, Green Mobility Holding, which is a consortium led by the Volkswagen Group, Attestor, and Pon Holdings, announced that the consortium would acquire Europcar Mobility Group, and the transaction closed in June 2022.

== Corporate affairs ==
Europcar's head office was formerly in the Immeuble Les Quadrants in Saint-Quentin-en-Yvelines, France.

== Commitments ==
=== Sport sponsorships ===
Europcar began sponsoring sport teams in 1980. The group sponsored a Formula One Renault team and the Paris-Dakar rally. The company was also involved in other sports such as golf, horse racing, and marathons. Europcar has sponsored 2009 ICC Champions Trophy organised by ICC which was held in South Africa, although it was not a major sponsor. Since 2011, Europcar has been sponsoring the French professional road cycling team managed by Jean-René Bernaudeau, names after the brand: Team Europcar. The group received the "Sponsor of the year" title for its involvement in cycling, awarded by Sporsora.

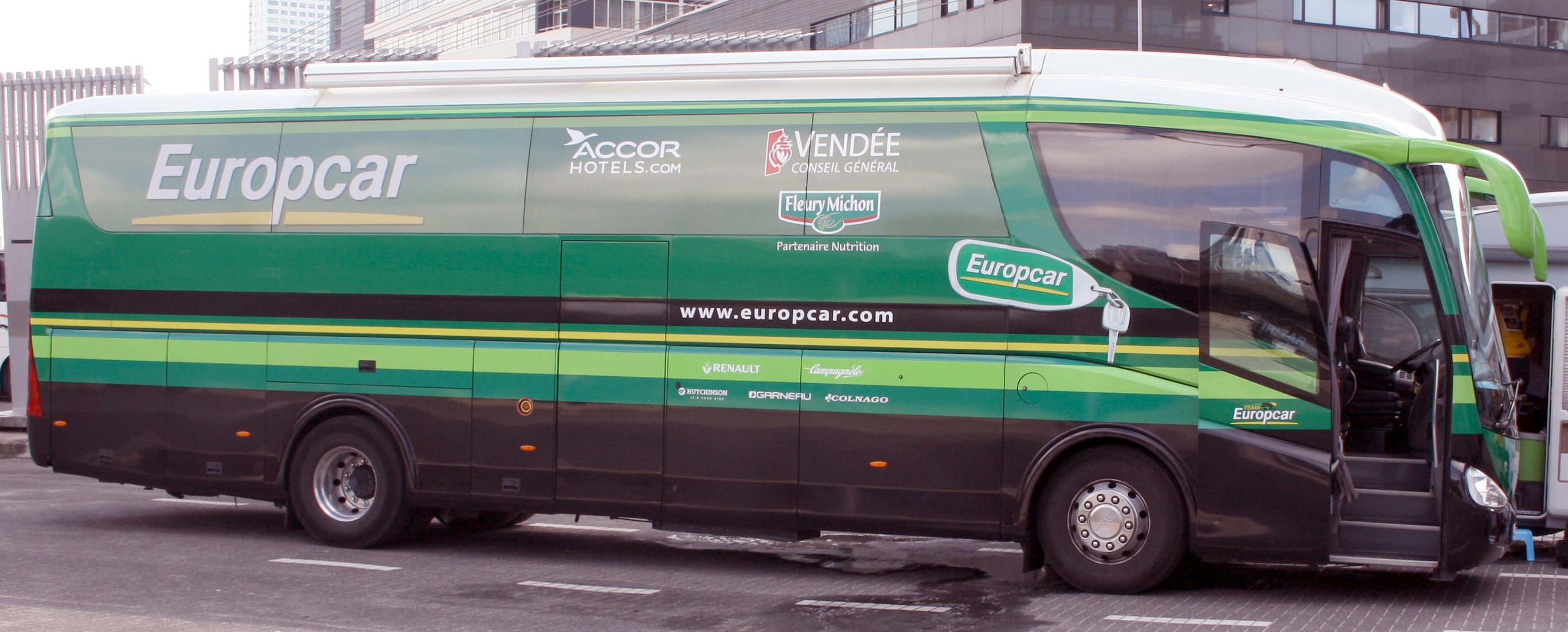
Team Europcar Irizar PB coach at the World Ports Classic, August 2013

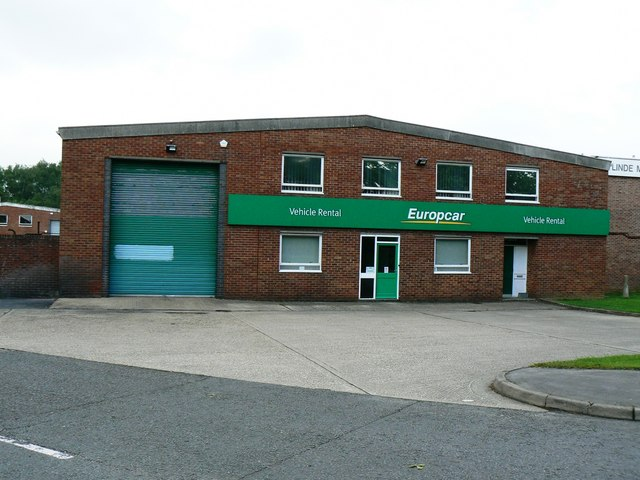
Europcar garage in Hampshire, England, May 2008

In August 2014, Arsenal F.C. announced that Europcar UK had become the club's official car and van rental partner over a three-year deal.

=== Corporate citizenship ===
Europcar joined the United Nations Global Compact in 2005 and adopted the ten fundamental principles of the pact. The company is invested in the "Green Charter" programme, certified by Bureau Veritas and is also a partner of WeForest, an international non-profit organisation whose goal is to foster reforestation.

== Legal issues ==
In June 2014, the Australian Federal Court ruled that a Europcar franchisee (now corporate owned) in Tasmania had "engaged in unconscionable conduct and made false or misleading representations when charging customers for damage to hire vehicles" and fined the former franchisee owner $264,000.

On 23 June 2017 the company's head offices in England were raided by Leicester Trading Standards and a case referred to the Serious Fraud Office due to accusations of overcharging customers for repairing damage to hire vehicles.
