= Hôtel de Ville, Maurepas =

Town hall in Maurepas, France

Hôtel de Ville
- The main frontage of the Hôtel de Ville in 2006

General information
- Type: City hall
- Architectural style: Modern style
- Location: Maurepas, France
- Coordinates: 48.7621°N 1.9454°E
- Completed: c.1973

The Hôtel de Ville (French pronunciation: [otɛl də vil], City Hall) is a municipal building in Maurepas, Yvelines, in the western suburbs of Paris, standing on Place Charles de Gaulle.

== History ==
The old town hall

Following the French Revolution, the new town council initially met in the home of the mayor at the time. This arrangement continued until the late 19th century, when the council led by the mayor, Augustin Jobert, decided to commission a combined town hall and school. The site they selected, on the west side of what is now Rue Paul Drussant, was purchased from the local land owner, Aymeric-Henri de Cardevac d'Havrincourt, Marquis d'Havrincourt. The building was designed in the neoclassical style, built in brick with a cement render finish and was officially opened in August 1895. The design involved a symmetrical main frontage of five bays facing onto the street. The central bay featured a doorway with a cornice on the ground floor, a casement window on the first floor and a pediment with a clock in the tympanum at attic level. The other bays were fenestrated by casement windows on both floors.

In the late 1960s, following significant population growth, the council led by the mayor, Guy Schuler, decided to commission a modern town hall. The site they selected was on the northeastern side of a new town square known as Square du Morvan. The new building was designed in the modern style, as part of a masterplan for the town by Jacques Riboud, built in concrete and glass and was completed in 1973.

The design involved an asymmetrical main frontage of two bays facing onto Square du Morvan. The ground floor was fenestrated by plate glass windows with dark frames. On the first floor, the left-hand bay featured a French door with a concrete surround and a balcony, while the right-hand bay featured an external staircase leading up to a glass doorway with a concrete surround. Both bays were flanked by full-height pink-coloured pilasters supporting an entablature, and were decorated, at second floor level, by mosaic panels created by Dominique Hideux and Medjid Houari. The southeastern elevation (i.e. the right-hand side) of four bays was decorated, at second-floor level, by panels in a similar style, while the northwestern side (i.e. the left-hand side) of four bays was decorated, at first-floor level, by panels with copper sculptures in high-relief by Gérard Ramon. The copper sculptures were intended to depict the development of the town: the rural landscape, civil engineering, municipal construction, and the urban landscape. Internally, the principal room was the Salle du Conseil (council chamber) at the front of the building.

A sculpture cast in shaped copper entitled "La jeune fille mélancolique" (the sad young girl) was also created by Ramon and installed in the square in front of the town hall later. It formed part of a series of sculptures by Ramon known as the "Créations Urbaines Jacques Riboud" (Jacques Ribound Urban Creations).

A major programme of works, involving the refurbishment of the ground floor and the remodelling of the reception area, was initiated at a cost of €650,000 in November 2016, and completed in June 2017.
