= Voisins-le-Bretonneux =

- Commune
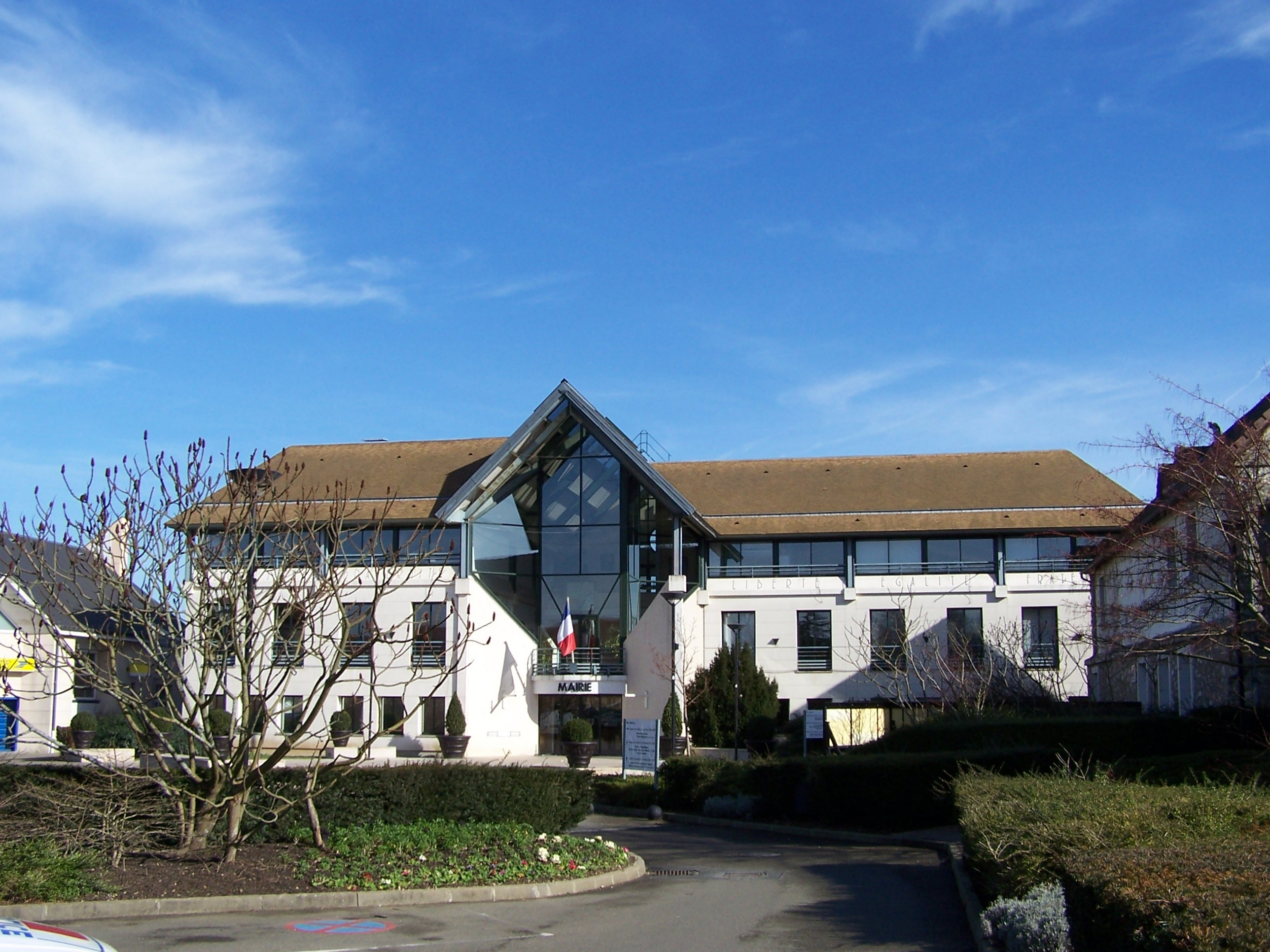
- The town hall in Voisins-le-Bretonneux

- Coat of arms

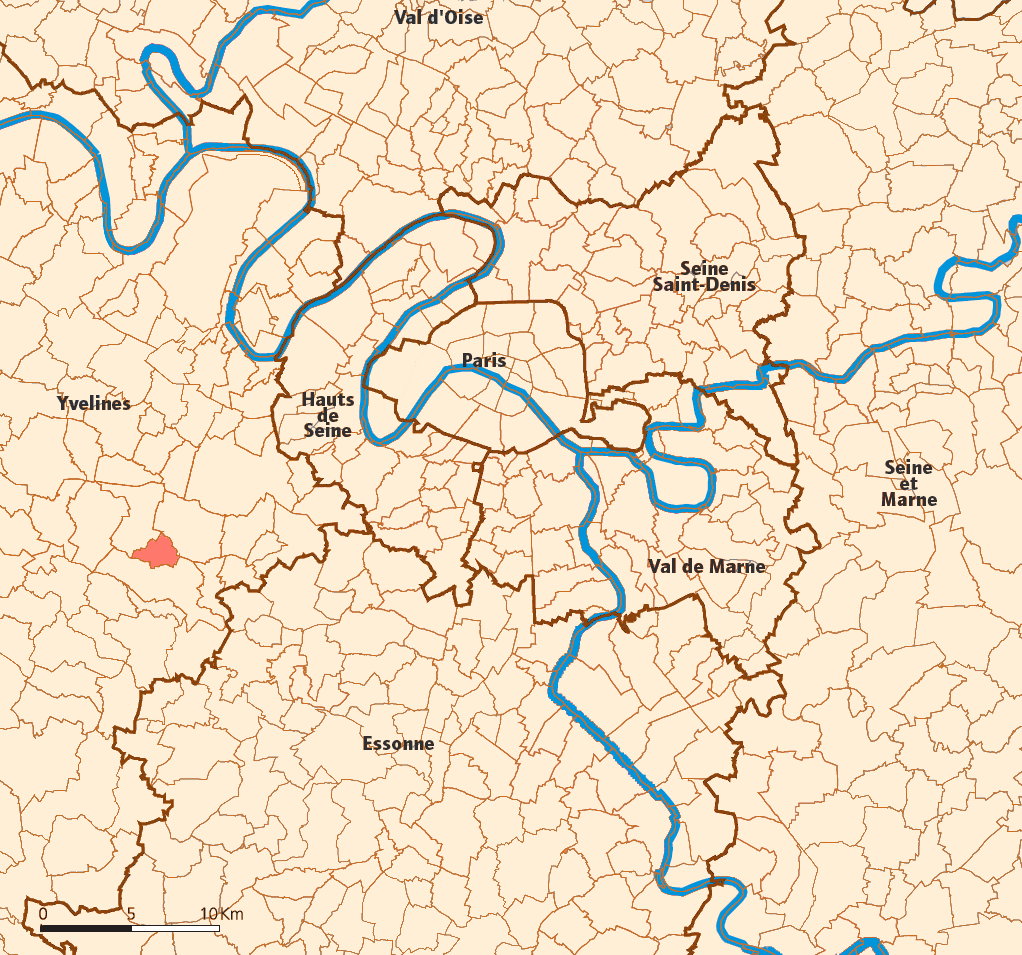
- Location (in red) within Paris inner and outer suburbs
- Location of Voisins-le-Bretonneux
- Location within France Location within Île-de-France (region)
- Coordinates: 48°45′33″N 2°03′06″E
- Country: France
- Region: Île-de-France
- Department: Yvelines
- Arrondissement: Rambouillet
- Canton: Maurepas
- Intercommunality: Saint-Quentin-en-Yvelines

Government
  - Mayor (2020–2026): Alexandra Rosetti
- Area^{1}: 2.38 km^{2} (0.92 sq mi)
- Highest elevation: 169 m (554 ft)
- Lowest elevation: 145 m (476 ft)
- Population (2023): 10,624
  - Density: 4,460/km^{2} (11,600/sq mi)
- Time zone: UTC+01:00 (CET)
  - Summer (DST): UTC+02:00 (CEST)
- INSEE/Postal code: 78688 /78960
- ^{1} French Land Register data, which excludes lakes, ponds, glaciers > 1 km^{2} (0.386 sq mi or 247 acres) and river estuaries.

Voisins-le-Bretonneux (French pronunciation: [vwazɛ̃ lə bʁətɔnø]) is a commune in the Yvelines department in the Île-de-France region in north-central France. It is located in the south-western suburbs of Paris 24.1 km (15.0 mi) from the centre in the new town of Saint-Quentin-en-Yvelines.

== Population ==
Historical population
Year	Pop.	±% p.a.
1968	680	—
1975	2,132	+17.73%
1982	5,229	+13.67%
1990	11,220	+10.01%
1999	12,153	+0.89%
2007	12,153	+0.00%
2012	11,470	−1.15%
2017	11,088	−0.68%
2023	10,624	−0.71%
Source: INSEE

== Transport ==
Voisins-le-Bretonneux has no Paris Métro, RER, or suburban rail station. The closest station to Voisins-le-Bretonneux is Saint-Quentin-en-Yvelines–Montigny-le-Bretonneux station on Paris RER line C, on the Transilien Line U suburban rail line, and on the Transilien Line N suburban rail line. This station is located in the neighboring commune of Montigny-le-Bretonneux, 3.2 km (2.0 mi) from the town centre of Voisins-le-Bretonneux.

== Economy ==
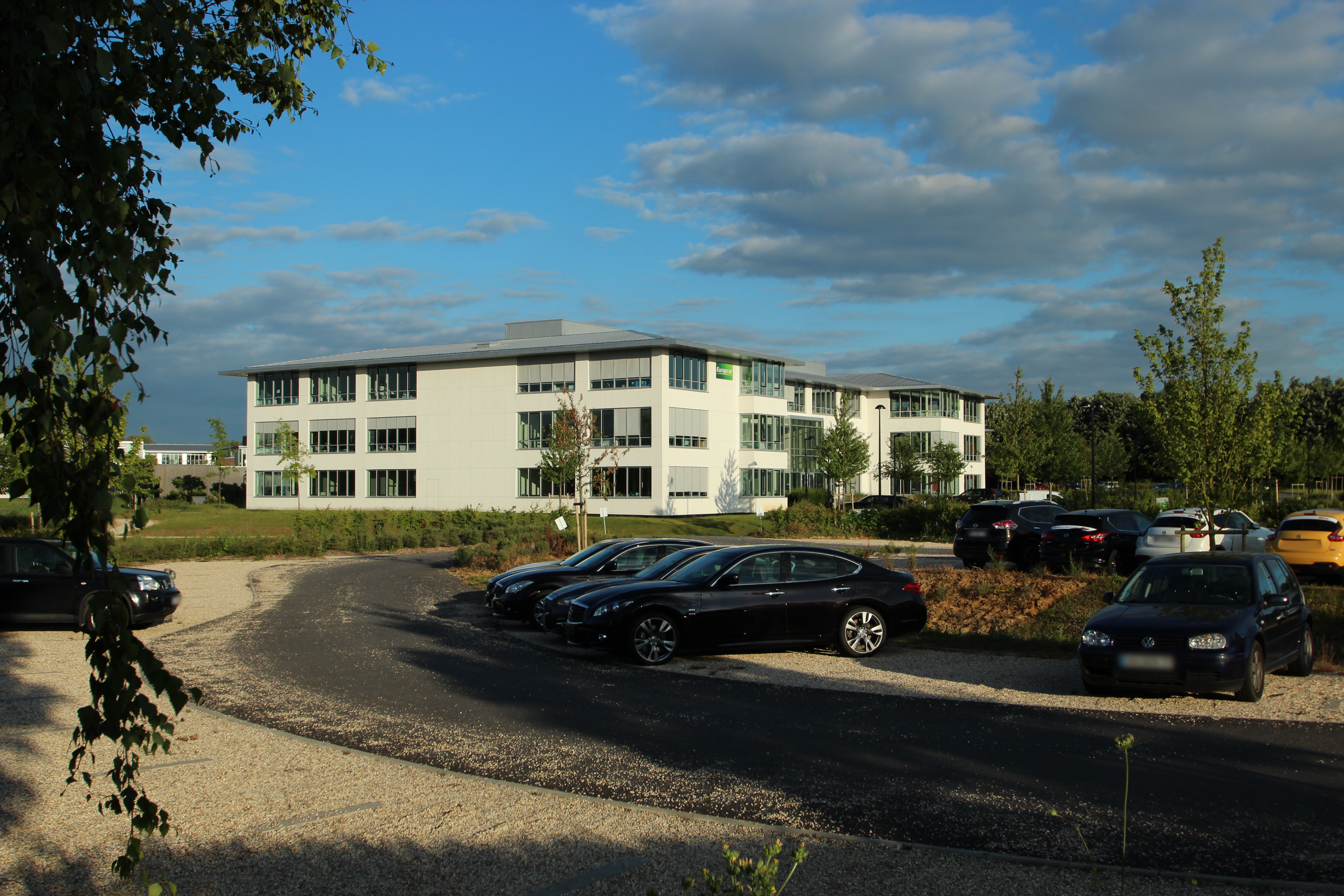
Head office of Europcar

The commune has the head office of Europcar.

In 2010, the median income per household was 60 262 € (=80,148.46 USD 2010), ranking Voisins-le-Bretonneux 37th among the 31,525 communes with more than 39 households in metropolitan France.

== Education ==
As of 2016 the municipality's preschools had 408 students, while the elementary schools had 766 students. The municipality puts these schools into six groups.

- Groupe scolaire Les 40 Arpents
- Groupe scolaire La Grande Île
- Groupe scolaire Les Pépinières
- Groupe scolaire Le Bois de la Garenne
- Groupe scolaire Le Lac
- Groupe scolaire La Sente des Carrières

There is also a private primary school, Les Tilleuls.

== Twin towns – sister cities ==
Voisins-le-Bretonneux is twinned with:

- Irvine, Scotland, United Kingdom
- Łuków, Poland
- Schenefeld, Germany

== See also ==
- Communes of the Yvelines department
