= Milon-la-Chapelle =

- Commune
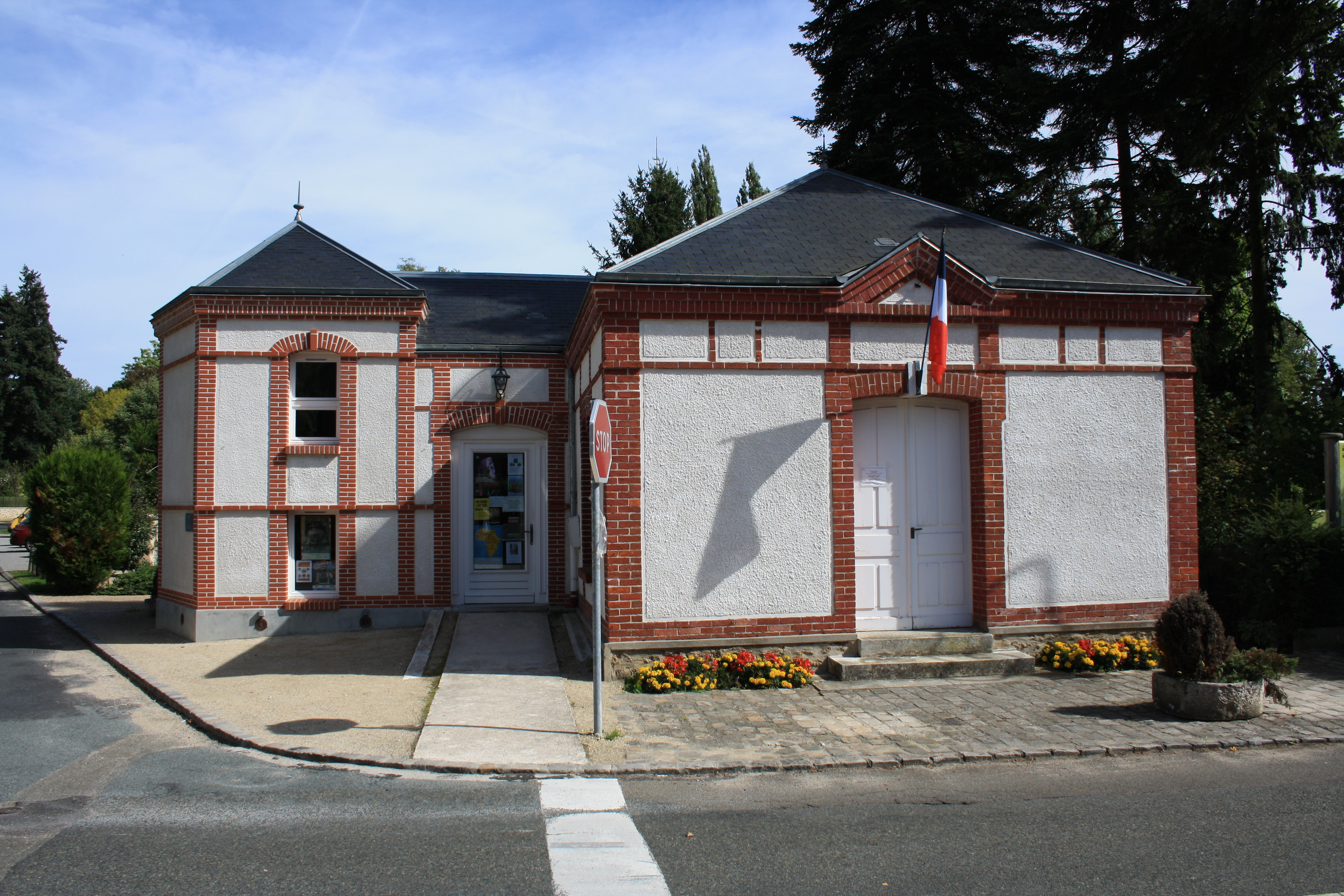
- The town hall in Milon-la-Chapelle
- Location of Milon-la-Chapelle
- Location within France Location within Île-de-France (region)
- Coordinates: 48°43′37″N 2°03′39″E
- Country: France
- Region: Île-de-France
- Department: Yvelines
- Arrondissement: Rambouillet
- Canton: Maurepas

Government
  - Mayor (2020–2026): Pascal Hamon
- Area^{1}: 3.06 km^{2} (1.18 sq mi)
- Elevation: 93 m (305 ft)
- Highest elevation: 164 m (538 ft)
- Lowest elevation: 80 m (260 ft)
- Population (2023): 295
  - Density: 96.4/km^{2} (250/sq mi)
- Time zone: UTC+01:00 (CET)
  - Summer (DST): UTC+02:00 (CEST)
- INSEE/Postal code: 78406 /78470
- ^{1} French Land Register data, which excludes lakes, ponds, glaciers > 1 km^{2} (0.386 sq mi or 247 acres) and river estuaries.

Milon-la-Chapelle (French pronunciation: [milɔ̃ la ʃapɛl]) is a commune in the Yvelines department in the Île-de-France region in north-central France. As of 2020, it is the commune with the third highest median per capita income (€52,650 per year) in France.

== Arts and culture ==
A chapel in the village, the Église de l'Assomption de la très Sainte Vierge, has a bas-relief sculpture by Georges Saupique.

== See also ==
- Communes of Yvelines
