= La Verrière station =

Railway station in La Verrière, France

Coordinates: 48°45′20″N 1°56′37″E

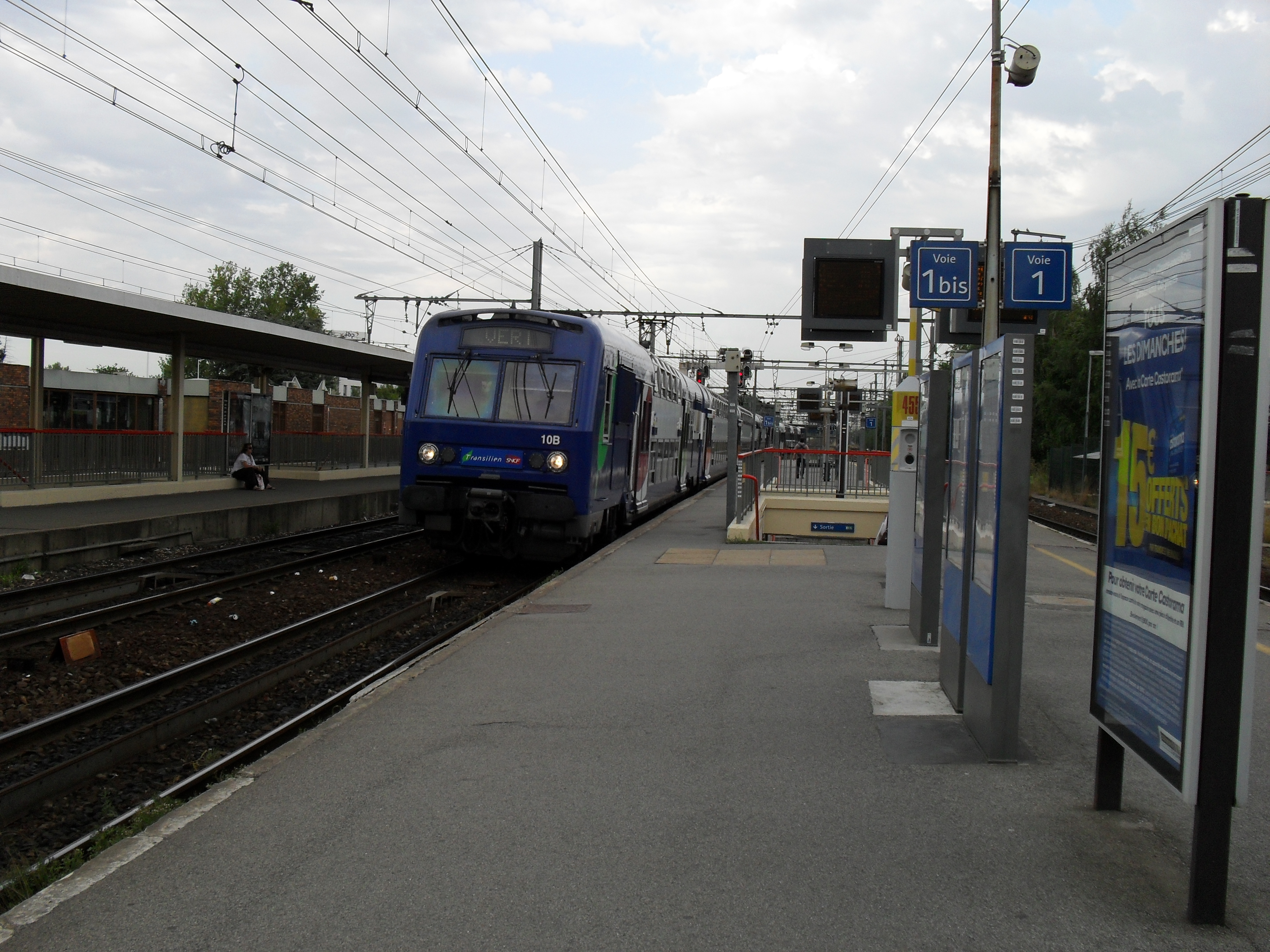
Platforms

La Verrière (French pronunciation: [la vɛʁjɛʁ]) is a railway station serving La Verrière, a western suburb of Paris, France. It is situated on the Paris–Brest railway. It is served by Transilien Line N trains from Paris-Montparnasse to Rambouillet, and it is the terminus of Transilien Line U from La Défense.

Preceding station	Transilien	Following station
Coignières towards Rambouillet	Line N	Trappes towards Paris–Montparnasse
Terminus	Line U	Trappes towards La Défense
