= Lycée Dumont d'Urville (Maurepas, Yvelines) =

Secondary school in Maurepas, Yvelines, France

Coordinates: 43.1169°N 5.9392°E

Lycée Dumont d'Urville (French pronunciation: [lise dymɔ̃ dyʁvil]) is a senior high school/sixth form college in Maurepas, Yvelines, France in the Paris metropolitan area; it serves Maurepas and Élancourt.
