= List of mocking awards =

This is a list of negative or anti-awards and mock prizes.

== Arts and entertainment ==
- Bad Sex in Fiction Award, awarded by the British magazine Literary Review
- Bald Archy Prize, an Australian art prize, parodying the Australian Archibald Prize and mocking Australian celebrities
- Barbara Dex Award, given annually to the "worst dressed" artist in the Eurovision Song Contest
- Bookseller/Diagram Prize for Oddest Title of the Year, given for published books with the most unintentionally bizarre titles
- Bunshun Kiichigo Awards, for the worst Japanese and foreign films
- Bulwer-Lytton Fiction Contest, for the deliberately worst written opening sentence for a (non-existent) novel
- Faux Faulkner contest, for parodying William Faulkner
- Filmfail Awards, for the biggest failures of Bollywood
- Ghanta Awards, recognizing the worst in Bollywood in various categories
- Golden Broom Awards, for the most disappointing Chinese films
- Golden Kela Awards, spotlighting the worst performances in Hindi cinema
- Golden Raspberry Awards, for the worst in American cinema
- Golden Mullet Awards, reviewers' picks for worst video games of the past year
- Joyce Kilmer Memorial Bad Poetry Contest, annual best of the worst poetry contest at Columbia University
- K Foundation art award, presented to the "worst artist of the year"
- Lyttle Lytton Contest, based on the Bulwer-Lytton Fiction Contest, but with restrictions
- Naomi Awards, dedicated to the year's worst music acts
- Stinkers Bad Movie Awards, chosen by a Los Angeles-based group of film buffs and movie critics
- Wąż Award, for the worst in Polish cinema
- Turnip Prize, for deliberately bad modern art

== Language and speaking ==
- Académie de la Carpette anglaise, to "members of the French élite who distinguish themselves by relentlessly promoting the domination of the English language over the French language in France and in European institutions."
- Doublespeak Award, an "ironic tribute to public speakers who have perpetuated language that is grossly deceptive, evasive, euphemistic, confusing, or self-centered"
- Ernie Awards, for comments deemed misogynistic
- Foot in Mouth Award, for "a baffling comment by a public figure"
- Golden Bull Award, for organizations which use confusing and bad English
- Un-word of the year, for a German word or word group deemed to be the year's most offensive new or recently popularized term
- Word of the year, including "most unnecessary", "most outrageous", "most euphemistic", "least likely to succeed"

== Science and pseudoscience ==
- Allergen of the Year
- Bent Spoon Award for paranormal or pseudo-scientific fraud
- Erratic Boulder Award (orig. Bludný Balvan), for the contribution of individuals and societies in misleading the Czech public and the development of a muddy way of thinking
- Goldenes Brett, for the most astonishing pseudo-scientific nuisance of the year in German-speaking countries
- Honorary Academician of VRAL (Russian: Почётный академик ВРАЛ), for outstanding contribution to creation and spread of pseudoscience and antiscience in Russia
- Ig Nobel Prize, started off as an award for questionable scientific achievements, but evolved into an honourable award with the slogan 'honor achievements that first make people laugh, and then make them think'. It still sporadically mocks public figures with no published research.
- Pigasus Award, for paranormal fraud, presented by noted skeptic James Randi
- Snuffed Candle Award for presenting pseudoscience as genuine

== Sports ==
- The Gooker Award, given each year to the worst gimmick, storyline, match or event in professional wrestling in that year.
- Bidone d'oro, for the most disappointing player in Serie A Italian football league
- Douglas Wilkie Medal, presented to those who do the least for Australian rules football
- Mr. Irrelevant, for the last player selected in each year's NFL draft
- Wooden spoon (award), usually given to an individual or team which has come last in a competition, but sometimes also to runners-up

== Other ==
- Big Brother Awards, to recognize "the government and private sector organizations ... which have done the most to threaten personal privacy"
  - Big Brother Awards (Australia)
  - Big Brother Awards (Finland)
  - Big Brother Awards (Italy)
  - Big Brother Awards (United Kingdom)
- Carbuncle Cup, for bad architecture
- Darwin Awards, for removing oneself from the gene pool (i.e. killing oneself) in an unusual fashion
- Fake News Awards, created by Donald Trump to highlight news outlets responsible for misrepresenting him or producing false reports
- Golden Fleece Award, for financial waste within the U.S. government
- Herman Cain Award, for people who have promoted COVID-19 misinformation and later died of COVID-19
- Pwnie Awards, recognizing both excellence and incompetence in the field of information security
- Roger Award, for the worst transnational corporation operating in New Zealand
- Salt Lick Award, given to Canadian manufacturers of foods that have high sodium levels
- Shafta Awards (journalism), British awards given annually for "the very worst in tabloid journalism"
- Sir Hugh Casson Award, for the worst new building of the year
- Stella Awards, now defunct, for frivolous lawsuits
- Wet Gunpowder Award, Iranian award given to "someone who is against the Islamic Revolution" and who "against their own wishes, performs a service to the revolution."

== See also ==
- Lists of awards
