= Blockades of the Tolbiac center of University of Paris 1 Pantheon-Sorbonne =

Protest technique of shutting down part of the University of Paris

The Pierre Mendès-France (a.k.a. Tolbiac) centre of University of Paris 1 Pantheon-Sorbonne, which hosts undergraduate lectures, is regularly blocked by students in order to protest reforms of the government. Lectures are then cancelled, up to several months.

== 1995 blockades ==
There were blockades in 1995.

== 1997 blockades ==
Tolbiac center has been occupied by 200 protesters for one month after a reform in 1997.

== 2006 blockades ==
After some small fights, lectures have been cancelled and Tolbiac occupied in 2006.

== 2007-09 blockades ==
During the 2007–09 university protests in France, Tolbiac center of Paris 1 has been multiple times occupied by 75 to 200 far-left or left activist and courses have been cancelled to prevent further occupations. Violence been spotted: some doors of the university have been cut with jig-saws, people have been pressed against grids and slapped, those wearing kippas insulted for being Jew.

== 2010 blockades ==
Tolbiac has been blocked in 2010, after a reform and to pay tribute to students who have blocked Tolbiac in 1995 and 2006.

== 2018 blockades ==
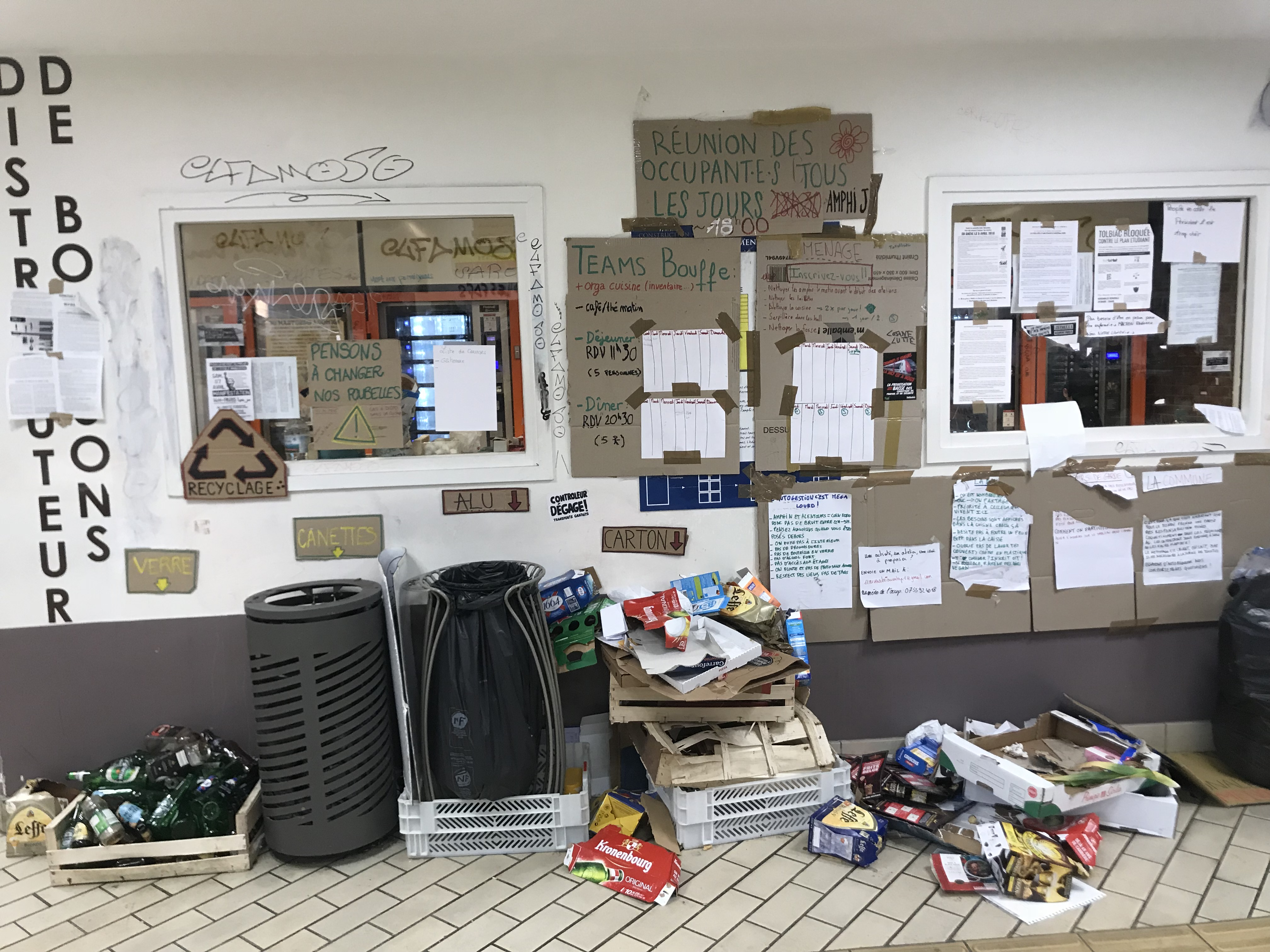

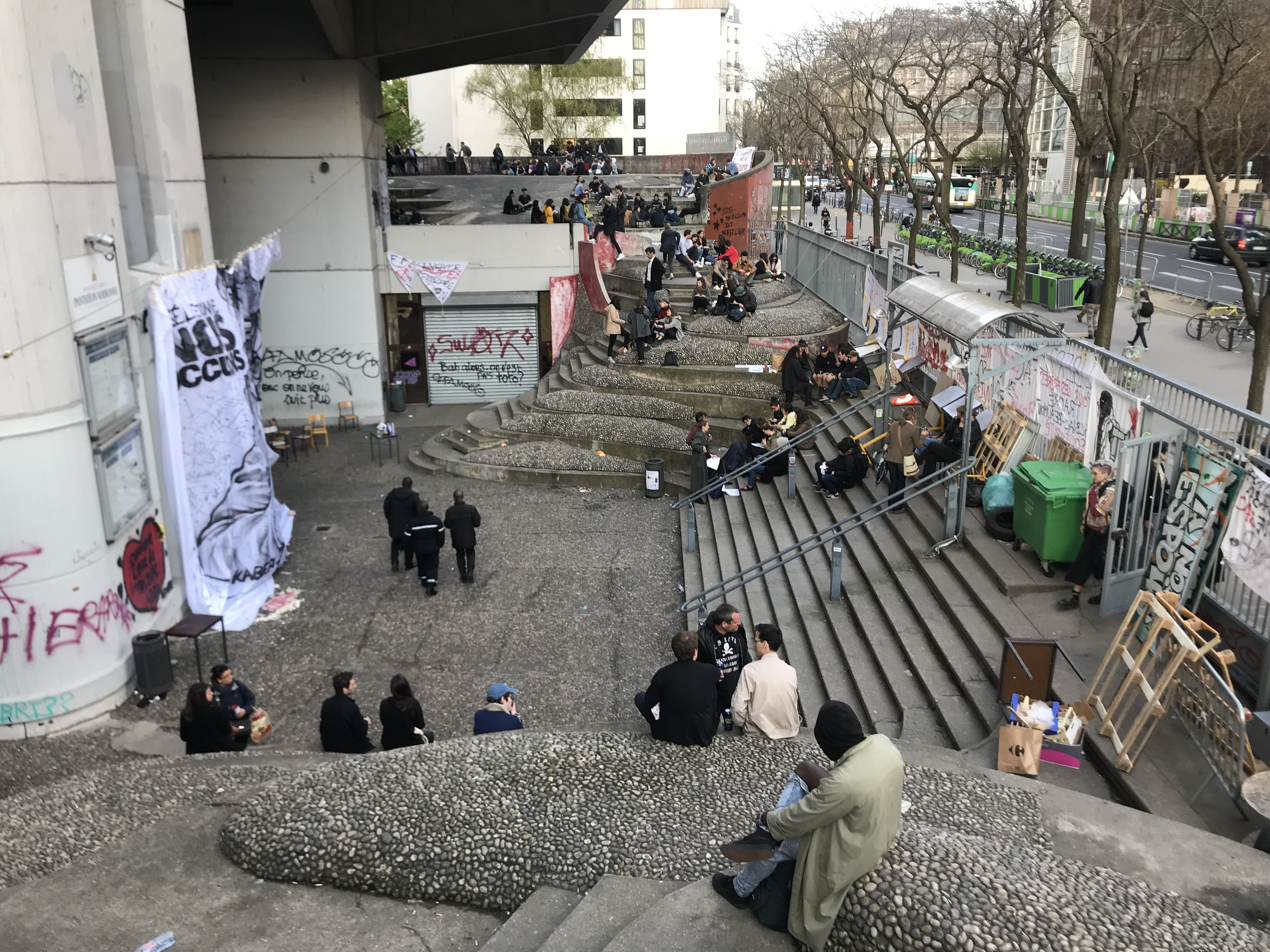

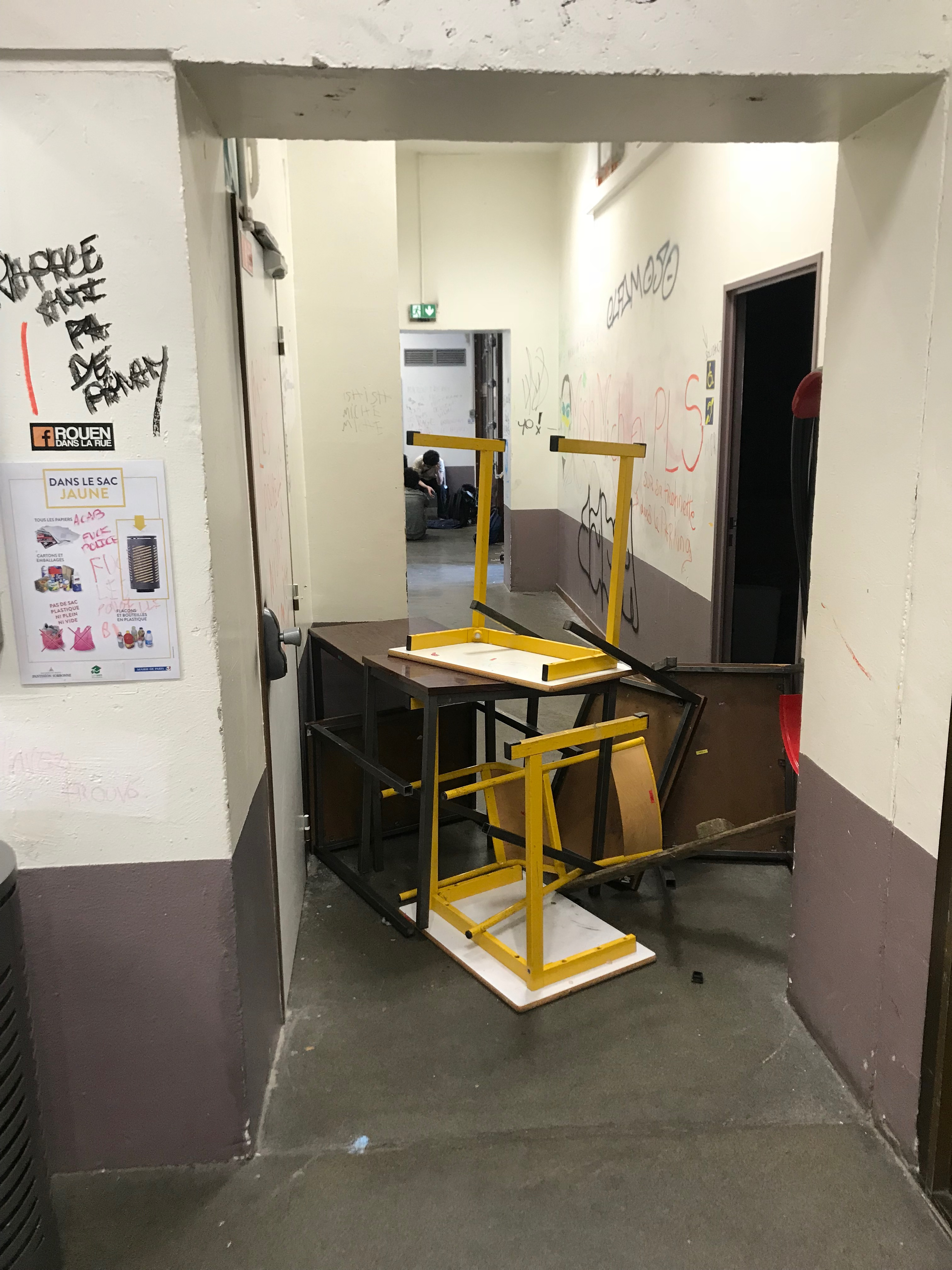

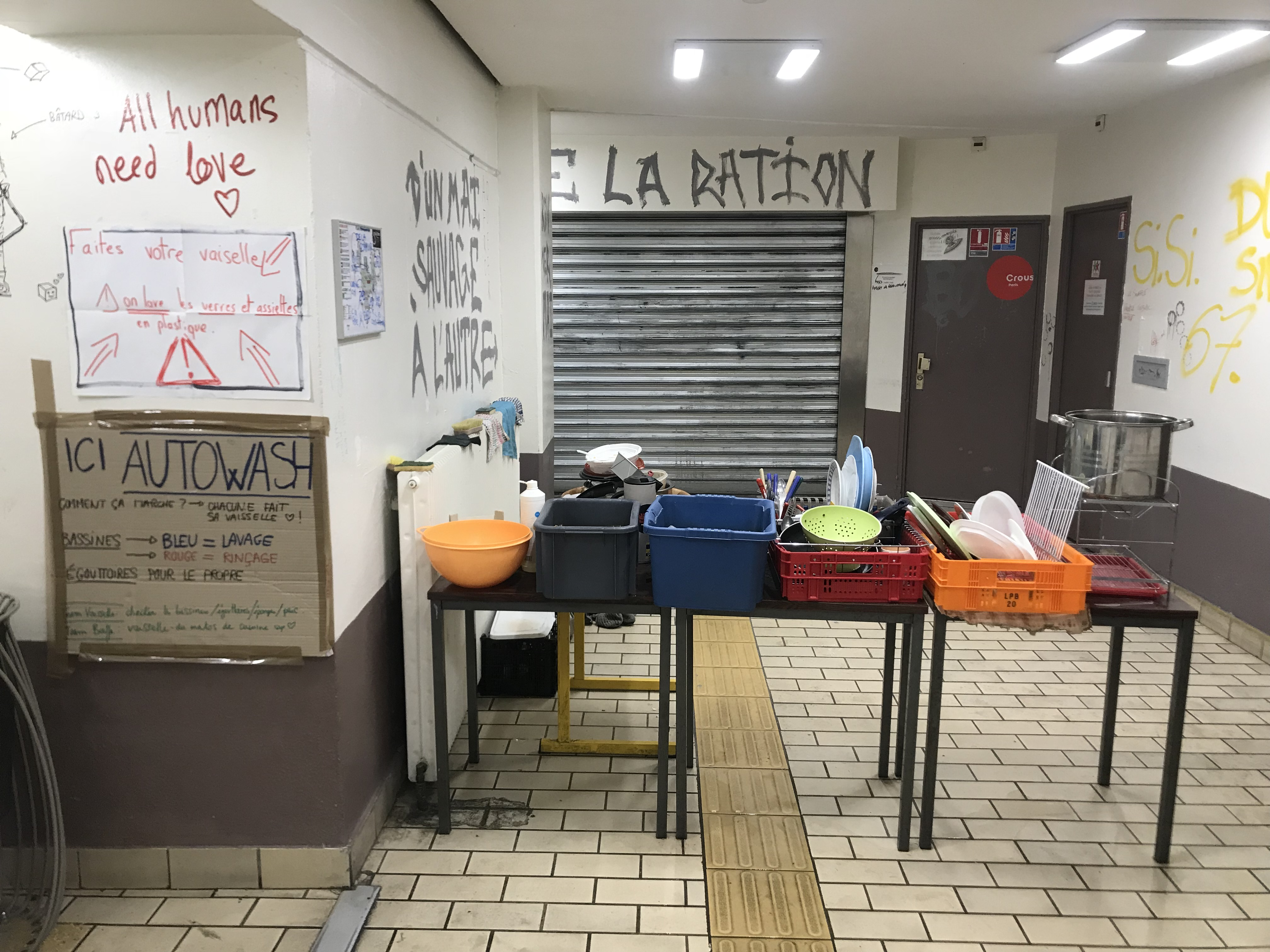

In 2018, Tolbiac centre was occupied for one month. Among some students' many demands were:

1. the revocation of the Plan Etudiants , or its non-application by Panthéon-Sorbonne. The Plan Etudiants is a vast reform of French public education aiming to increase selectiveness and inter-university competition. The most controversial aspects of it were the weakening of the right to a higher education guaranteed to all high-schoolers upon completion of secondary education, the biased criteria of selection (geographical discrimination, students with handicaps not taken into account etc.), the incentives to privatize some aspects of public universities, or the increased possibility for universities to control their students' scholarships (scholarships are based on social criteria and controlled by the state in France)
2. the resignation of the president of France Emmanuel Macron;
3. the Republic's recognition of Kurdistan's statehood;
4. an automatic pass mark for all students of Pantheon-Sorbonne.

Violent militants were spotted and Molotov cocktails found. An MP came to Tolbiac to discuss with the occupants but toilet paper and tomato juice were thrown on him by the occupants. Some occupants gave a press conference from inside the building, with a dog on the press table and with a setting which was mocked over the internet. A parodic Twitter account of the dog speaker was set out and received nearly 30 000 followers; it was called a "satire of (leftist) militantism".

Some professors of history and other social sciences of Pantheon-Sorbonne approved of the occupation. However, the president of the university Georges Haddad denounced a capharnaum of violence, drug, sex and rave parties in the occupied Tolbiac center and asked the police to remove the occupants. The police first refused to do it and Macron explained that decision in a TV interview by referring to the topography of the Tolbiac centre. The police finally broke in during the early morning, while the occupants were sleeping. The police found new Molotov cocktails. The students had heavily vandalized the recently refurbished center; the cost of the damages was declared to be 800,000 euros (approximately 0.38% of the university's yearly budget). Haddad decided to file a criminal complaint.

Tolbiac center was briefly blocked in October 2018, one student having been injured.

== 2020 ==
In March 2020, a group of students tried to block the center and a general vote led to clashes.

== 2023 ==
For several weeks, students from the University blocked the Pierre Mendès France centre, taking part in a national mobilization against the highly controversial pension reform in France. <ref>

== 2024 ==
In November 2024, students blocked the Tolbiac campus of the University for several weeks in support of the Palestinian people. Every day of mobilization, General Assemblies are organized to collectively decide on the next steps in the mobilization. The main demand of the movement is the suspension of the university’s partnerships with Israeli universities and companies, which it considers complicit in the genocide in Gaza.
