= Golden Fleece Award =

Tongue-in-cheek award issued by US Senator William Proxmire

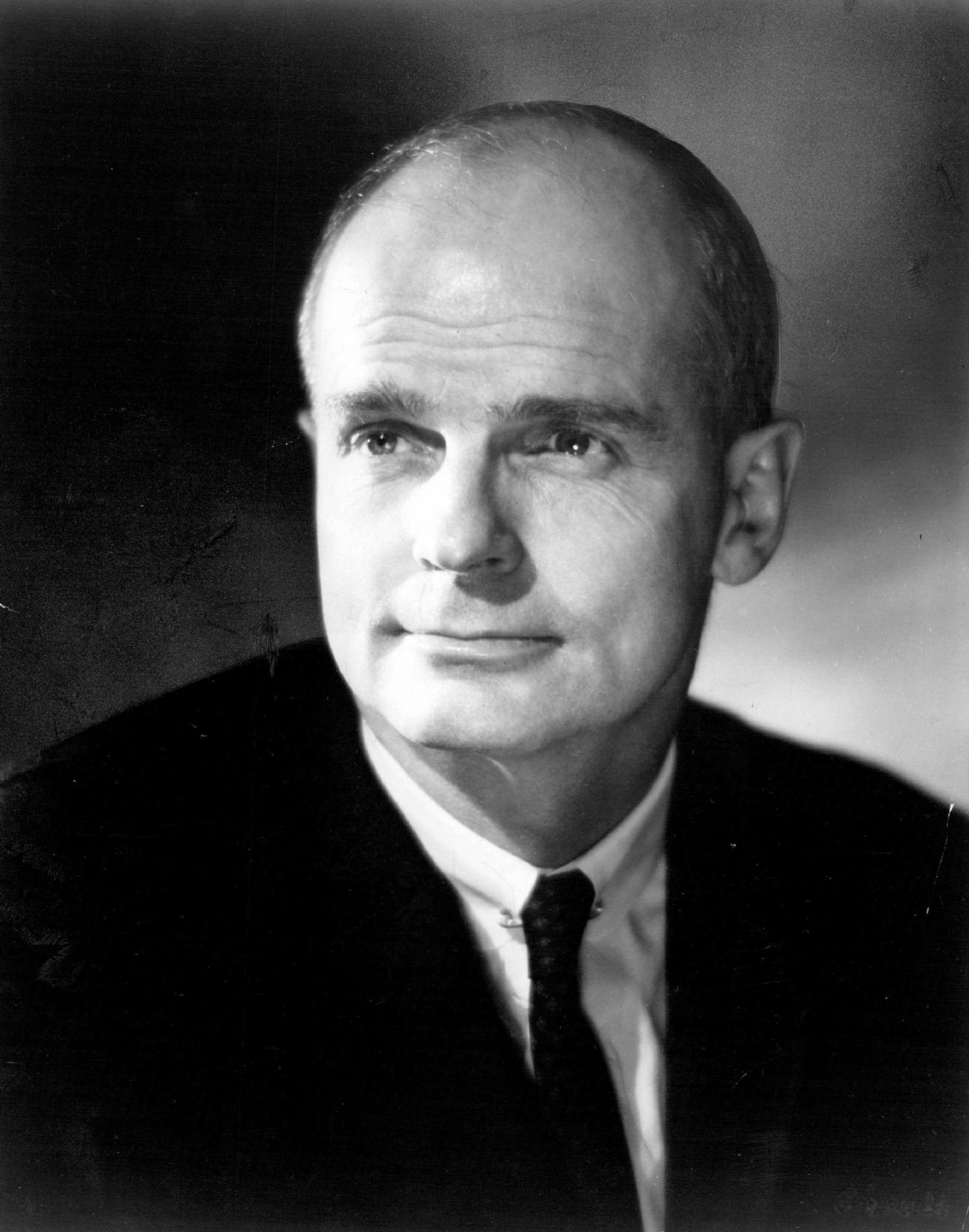
William Proxmire issued the Golden Fleece 168 times for what he deemed wasteful spending

The Golden Fleece Award (1975–1988) was a tongue-in-cheek award given to public officials in the United States for squandering public money. Its name is sardonically taken from the actual Order of the Golden Fleece, a prestigious chivalric award created in the late 15th century. It is a play on the transitive verb fleece, or charging excessively for goods or services.

United States Senator William Proxmire, Democrat from Wisconsin, began to issue the Golden Fleece Award in 1975 in monthly press releases. In 1988, The Washington Post referred to the award as "the most successful public relations device in politics today". Senator Robert Byrd of West Virginia referred to the award as being "as much a part of the Senate as quorum calls and filibusters".

== Award ==
William Proxmire, a United States Senator who represented the Democratic Party from Wisconsin, issued the award monthly from 1975 until 1988. He issued 168 Golden Fleece Awards. Though some members of the United States House of Representatives asked Proxmire's permission to continue the award, he declined, saying he might continue to issue them as a private citizen. Other organizations patterned their own "Golden Fleece Awards" after Proxmire's. Taxpayers for Common Sense, a nonpartisan federal budget watchdog organization, gave Proxmire their lifetime achievement award in 1999, and revived the Golden Fleece Award in 2000. Proxmire served as an honorary chairman of the organization.

== Reception ==
One "winner", behavioral scientist Ronald Hutchinson, sued Proxmire for $8 million in damages in 1976. Proxmire claimed that his statements about Hutchinson's research were protected by the Speech or Debate Clause of the United States Constitution. The Supreme Court of the United States ruled, in Hutchinson v. Proxmire, that the protection of speech and debate of lawmakers in the Constitution did not shield Proxmire from liability for defamatory statements made outside of formal congressional proceedings. The case was later settled out of court. Proxmire continued to present the award following the suit.

In 2012 several organizations created the Golden Goose Award, celebrating federally funded scientists doing basic research with benefits to society or humanity.

In his 2014 book Creativity, Inc., Pixar President Ed Catmull wrote of the "chilling effect on research" the Golden Fleece Award exerted. He argued that when thousands of research projects are funded, some have measurable, positive impacts and others don't. It is not possible to predict what the results of every research project will be or whether they will have value. Catmull further argued that failure in research is essential and that fear of failure would distort the way researchers choose projects, which would ultimately impede progress.

== Award winners ==
Winners of the Golden Fleece Award included governmental organizations like the United States Department of Defense, Bureau of Land Management, and National Park Service; research projects have been particularly well represented. Many of the projects have been characterized as junk science that "lack substance" and were "marginal or useless scientific research".

The National Science Foundation (NSF) won the first Golden Fleece Award for spending $84,000 on a study on love. Proxmire reasoned that:

I object to this not only because no one—not even the National Science Foundation—can argue that falling in love is a science; not only because I'm sure that even if they spend $84 million or $84 billion they wouldn't get an answer that anyone would believe. I'm also against it because I don't want the answer. I believe that 200 million other Americans want to leave some things in life a mystery, and right on top of the things we don't want to know is why a man falls in love with a woman and vice versa.

The Federal Aviation Administration was named for spending $57,800 on a study of the physical measurements of 432 airline stewardesses, including "distance from knee to knee while sitting", and "the politeal [sic] length of the buttocks."

Proxmire gave the award to the National Aeronautics and Space Administration (NASA) for their search for extraterrestrial intelligence (SETI) program, supporting the scientific search for extraterrestrial civilizations. Proxmire later withdrew his opposition to the SETI program.

It is widely believed that Proxmire gave the award to a study of the sex life of the screwworm fly, the results of which led scientists to create sterile screwworms, which were released into the wild and eliminated this major cattle parasite from North and Central America, and reduced the cost of beef and dairy products across the globe. However, there is no evidence for this claim in the archives of the award held by the Wisconsin Historical Society. Furthermore, the United States Department of Agriculture (USDA)-funded research on the sex life of the screwworm fly took place in the 1930s through 1950s, long before the Golden Fleece era of the 1970s and 80s, when Proxmire largely targeted contemporary research. The erroneous claim seems to stem from a speech by a former director of the National Science Foundation, who stated that Proxmire gave the award to an NSF grant titled "The Sexual Behavior of the Screwworm Fly," and later "freely admitted that the study of the sex life of the screwworm fly had been of major significance to progress in this important field."

Other award winners included:

- Paul Ekman's research that led to the development of the controversial Facial Action Coding System.
- National Institute on Drug Abuse (NIDA) funded project by psychologist Harris Rubin for $121,000, on developing "some objective evidence concerning marijuana's effect on sexual arousal by exposing groups of male pot-smokers to pornographic films and measuring their responses by means of sensors attached to their penises".
- National Science Foundation for spending $103,000 to compare aggressiveness in sun fish that drink tequila as opposed to gin.
- National Institute for Mental Health for spending $97,000 to study, among other things, what went on in a Peruvian brothel; the researchers said they made repeated visits in the interests of accuracy.
- Office of Education for spending $219,592 in a "curriculum package" to teach college students how to watch television.
- United States Department of the Army for a $6,000 study on how to buy Worcestershire sauce in 1981.
- United States Department of Commerce (Economic Development Administration) for spending $20,000 to build a 10-story replica of the Great Wall of China in Bedford, Indiana. Begun in 1979, the money proved insufficient and the site is currently abandoned.
- United States Department of Defense for a $3,000 study to determine if people in the military should carry umbrellas in the rain.
- United States Department of Justice for conducting a study on why prisoners want to escape.
- United States Postal Service for spending over $4 million on an advertisement campaign to make Americans write more letters to one another.
- Executive Office of the President of the United States, for spending $611,623 to restore a room in the Old Executive Office Building with gold trim.
- Ronald Reagan's 1985 inaugural committee, for spending $15.5 million of taxpayer money on the planned second inauguration of Reagan. (Most of the events could not be held outdoors due to extreme cold.) The outdoor events were cancelled in the interest of safety because the noon temperature was 7 °F (−14 °C) with −25 °F (−32 °C) wind chills, making it the coldest inauguration on record. Frostbite can occur in as little as 30 minutes in these conditions.

== See also ==
- Ig Nobel Prize
- List of mocking awards
- National Science Foundation: Under the Microscope
- Pork barrel
