= National Science Foundation =

Independent United States government agency

United States National Science Foundation
- Logo used since 2009

Agency overview
- Formed: May 10, 1950; 76 years ago
- Headquarters: Randolph Building, 401 Dulany Street, Alexandria, Virginia, U.S.
- Motto: Where Discoveries Begin
- Employees: 1532 (as of 2025)
- Annual budget: $8.75 billion for 2026
- Agency executives: Vacant, Director; Vacant, Deputy Director; Karen A. Marrongelle, Chief Science Officer; Brian Stone, Chief of Staff; Linnea Avallone, Chief Officer of Research Facilities; Vacant, Chief Information Officer (CIO)
- Website: nsf.gov

The United States National Science Foundation (NSF) is an independent agency of the United States federal government that supports fundamental research and education in all the non-medical fields of science and engineering. Its medical counterpart is the National Institutes of Health. With an annual budget of about $8.75 billion (fiscal year 2026), the NSF funds approximately 25% of all federally supported basic research conducted by the United States' colleges and universities. In some fields, such as mathematics, computer science, economics, and the social sciences, the NSF is the major source of federal backing.

NSF's director and deputy director are appointed by the president of the United States and confirmed by the United States Senate, whereas the 24 president-appointed members of the National Science Board (NSB) do not require U.S. Senate confirmation. The director and deputy director are responsible for administration, planning, budgeting and day-to-day operations of the foundation, while the NSB meets six times a year to establish its overall policies.

== History ==
=== Founding ===
Logo used from 1999 to 2009

The U.S. National Science Foundation (NSF) was established by the National Science Foundation Act of 1950. Its stated mission is "to promote the progress of science, to advance the national health, prosperity, and welfare, and to secure the national defense". The NSF's scope has expanded over the years to include many areas that were not in its initial portfolio, including the social and behavioral sciences, engineering, and science and mathematics education. The NSF is the only U.S. federal agency with a mandate to support all non-medical fields of research.

=== Budget and performance history ===
Since the technology boom of the 1980s, the U.S. Congress has generally embraced the premise that government-funded basic research is essential for the nation's economic health and global competitiveness, and for national defense. This support has manifested in an expanding National Science Foundation budget from $1 billion in 1983 to $8.28 billion in 2020.

NSF has published annual reports since 1950, and since the new millennium has added an annual "Performance Report". More recently, the NSF has focused on obtaining high return on investment from their spending on scientific research.

Various bills have sought to direct funds within the NSF. In 1981, the Office of Management and Budget (OMB) introduced a proposal to reduce the NSF social sciences directorate's budget by 75%. Economist Robert A. Moffit suggests a connection between this proposal and Democratic senator William Proxmire's Golden Fleece Award series criticizing "frivolous" government spending — Proxmire's first Golden Fleece had been awarded to the NSF in 1975 for granting $84,000 to a social science project investigating why people fall in love. Ultimately, the OMB's 75% reduction proposal failed, but the NSF Economics Program budget did fall 40%. In 2012, political science research was barred from NSF funding by the passage of the Flake Amendment, breaking the precedent of granting the NSF autonomy to determine its own priorities.

=== Funding profile ===
In fiscal year 2020, NSF received 42,400 proposals and awarded 12,100, for a funding rate of 28%. In FY 2021, the estimates are 43,200 and 11,500 respectively, giving a funding rate of 26.6%. According to FY 2020 numbers, the median annualized award size is $153,800 and the average duration of an award is 2.9 years.

In 2022 the NSF has started funding open source software as part of their Pathways to Enable Open-Source Ecosystems (POSE) program.

=== Timeline ===
==== Pre–World War II ====
Although the federal government had established nearly 40 scientific organizations between 1910 and 1940, the US relied upon a primarily laissez-faire approach to scientific research and development. Academic research in science and engineering occasionally received federal funding. Within University laboratories, almost all support came from private contributions and charitable foundations. In industrial laboratories, the concentration of workers and funding (some through military and government programs as a result of Roosevelt's New Deal) would eventually raise concern during the wartime period. In particular, concerns were raised that industry laboratories were largely allowed full patent rights of technologies developed with federal funds. These concerns, in part, led to efforts like Senator Harley M. Kilgore's "Science Mobilization Act".

==== 1940–1949 ====
Amidst growing awareness that US military capability depended on strength in science and engineering, Congress considered several proposals to support research in these fields. Separately, President Franklin D. Roosevelt sponsored creation of organizations to coordinate federal funding of science for war, including the National Defense Research Committee and the Office of Scientific Research and Development (OSRD) both from 1941 to 1947. Despite broad agreement over the principle of federal support for science, working out a consensus on how to organize and manage it required five years. The five-year political debate over the creation of a national scientific agency has been a topic for academic study, understood from a variety of perspectives. Themes include disagreements over administrative structure, patents and inclusion of social sciences, a populist-versus-scientist dispute, as well as the roles of political parties, Congress, and President Harry S. Truman.

Commonly, this debate is characterized by the conflict between New Deal senator Harley M. Kilgore and OSRD head Vannevar Bush. Narratives about the National Science Foundation prior to the 1970s typically concentrated on Vannevar Bush and his 1945 publication Science, The Endless Frontier. In this report, Vannevar Bush, then head of the Office of Scientific Research and Development which began the Manhattan Project, addressed plans for the postwar years to further foster government commitment to science and technology. Issued to President Harry S. Truman in July 1945, the report made a strong case for federally-funded scientific research, arguing that the nation would reap rich dividends in the form of better health care, a more vigorous economy, and a stronger national defense. It proposed creating a new federal agency, the National Research Foundation.

The NSF first appeared as a comprehensive New Deal Policy proposed by Sen. Harley Kilgore of West Virginia. In 1942, Senator Kilgore introduced the "Science Mobilization Act" (S. 1297), which did not pass. Perceiving organizational chaos, elitism, over-concentration of funds in elite universities, and lack of incentives for socially applicable research, Kilgore envisioned a comprehensive and centralized research body supporting basic and applied research which would be controlled by members of the public and civil servants rather than scientific experts. The public would own the rights to all patents funded by public monies and research monies would be equitably spread across universities. Kilgore's supporters included non-elite universities, small businesses, and the Budget Bureau. His proposals received mixed support.

Vannevar Bush opposed Kilgore, preferring science policy driven by experts and scientists rather than public and civil servants. Bush was concerned that public interests would politicize science, and believed that scientists would be the best judges of the direction and needs of their field. While Bush and Kilgore both agreed on the need for a national science policy, Bush maintained that scientists should continue to own the research results and patents, wanted project selection limited to scientists, and focused support on basic research, not the social sciences, leaving the market to support applied projects.

Sociologist Daniel Kleinman divides the debate into three broad legislative attempts. The first attempt consisted of the 1945 Magnuson bill (S. 1285), the 1945 Science and Technology Mobilization Bill, a 1945 compromise bill (S. 1720), a 1946 compromise bill (S. 1850), and the Mills Bill (H.B. 6448). The Magnuson bill was sponsored by Senator Warren Magnuson and drafted by the OSRD, headed by Vannevar Bush. The Science and Technology Mobilization bill was promoted by Harley Kilgore. The bills called for the creation of a centralized science agency, but differed in governance and research supported. The second attempt, in 1947, included Senator H. Alexander Smith's bill S. 526, and Senator Elbert Thomas's bill S. 525. The Smith bill reflected ideas of Vannevar Bush, while the Thomas bill was identical to the previous year's compromise bill (S. 1850).

After amendments, the Smith bill made it to President Truman's desk, but it was vetoed. Truman wrote that regrettably, the proposed agency would have been "divorced from control by the people to an extent that implies a distinct lack of faith in the democratic process". The third attempt began with the introduction of S. 2385 in 1948. This was a compromise bill cosponsored by Smith and Kilgore, and Bush aide John Teeter had contributed in the drafting process. In 1949, S. 247 was introduced by the same group of senators behind S. 2385, marking the fourth and final effort to establish a national science agency. Essentially identical to S. 2385, S. 247 passed the Senate and the House with a few amendments. It was signed by President Truman on May 10, 1950. Kleinman points out that the final NSF bill closely resembles Vannevar Bush's proposals.

Kilgore and Bush Proposals differed on five issues which were central to the larger debate (Chart reproduced)
	Populist Proposal (Harley Kilgore)	Scientist/Business Proposal (Vannevar Bush)	National Science Foundation Act 1950
Coordination/Planning	Strong Mandate	Vague Mandate	Vague Mandate
Control/Administration	Non-scientist members of the public: Business, labor, farmers, consumers	Scientists and other experts	Scientists and other experts
Research Supported	Basic and applied	Basic	Basic
Patent Policy	Nonexclusive licensing	No nonexclusive licensing	No nonexclusive licensing
Social Science Support	Yes	No	No

==== 1950–1959 ====
In 1950, Harry S. Truman signed Public Law 507, or 42 U.S.C. 16 creating the National Science Foundation. which provided for a National Science Board of twenty-four part-time members. In 1951, Truman nominated Alan T. Waterman, chief scientist at the Office of Naval Research, to become the first Director.

With the Korean War underway, the agency's initial budget was just $151,000 for 9 months. After moving its administrative offices twice, NSF began its first full year of operations with an appropriation from Congress of $3.5 million, far less the almost $33.5 million requested with which 28 research grants were awarded.

After the 1957, Soviet Union orbited Sputnik 1, the first ever human-made satellite, national self-appraisal questioned American education, scientific, technical and industrial strength and Congress increased the NSF appropriation for 1958 to $40 million.

In 1958, the NSF selected Kitt Peak, near Tucson, Arizona, as the site of the first national observatory, that would give any astronomer unprecedented access to state-of-the-art telescopes; previously major research telescopes were privately funded, available only to astronomers who taught at the universities that ran them. The idea expanded to encompass the National Optical Astronomy Observatory, the National Radio Astronomy Observatory, the National Solar Observatory, the Gemini Observatory and the Arecibo Observatory, all of which are funded in whole or in part by NSF. The NSF's astronomy program forged a close working relationship with NASA, also founded in 1958, in that the NSF provides virtually all the U.S. federal support for ground-based astronomy, while NASA's responsibility is the U.S. effort in space-based astronomy.

In 1959, the U.S. and other nations concluded the Antarctic Treaty reserving Antarctica for peaceful and scientific research, and a presidential directive gave the NSF responsibility for virtually all U.S. Antarctic operations and research in form of the United States Antarctic Program.

==== 1960–1969 ====
In 1963, President John F. Kennedy appointed Leland John Haworth as the second director of the NSF. During the 1960s, the impact of the Sputnik Crisis spurred international competition in science and technology and accelerated NSF growth. The NSF initiated a number of programs that support institution-wide research during this decade including the Graduate Science Facilities program (started in 1960), Institutional Grants for Science (started in 1961), and Science Development Grants, better known as Centers of Excellence program (started in 1964). Notable projects conducted during this decade include creation of the National Center for Atmospheric Research (1960), creation of the Division of Environmental Sciences (1965), deep sea exploration endeavors Project Mohole (1961) and the Deep Sea Drilling Project (1968–1983), the Ecosystems Analysis Program (1969), and ownership of the Arecibo Observatory (1969). In 1969, Franklin Long was tentatively selected to take over directorship of the NSF. His nomination caused some controversy due to his opposition to the current administration's antiballistic missile program and was ultimately rejected by President Richard Nixon. William D. McElroy instead took over as the third director of the NSF in 1969. By 1968, the NSF budget had reached nearly $500 million.

==== 1970–1979 ====
In 1972 the NSF took over management of twelve interdisciplinary materials research laboratories from the Defense Department's Advanced Research Projects Agency (DARPA). These university-based laboratories had taken a more integrated approach than did most academic departments at the time, encouraging physicists, chemists, engineers, and metallurgists to cross departmental boundaries and use systems approaches to attack complex problems of materials synthesis or processing. The NSF expanded these laboratories into a nationwide network of Materials Research Science and Engineering Centers. In 1972 the NSF launched the biennial "Science & Engineering Indicators" report to the US president and Congress, as required by the NSF Act of 1950. In 1977 the first interconnection of unrelated public data networks was developed, run by DARPA.

==== 1980–1989 ====
During this decade, increasing NSF involvement lead to a three-tiered system of internetworks managed by a mix of universities, nonprofit organizations, and government agencies. By the mid-1980s, primary financial support for the growing project was assumed by the NSF. In 1983, NSF budget topped $1 billion for the first time. Major increases in the nation's research budget were proposed as "the country recognizes the importance of research in science and technology, and education". The U.S. Antarctic Program was taken out of the NSF appropriation now requiring a separate appropriation. The NSF received more than 27,000 proposals and funded more than 12,000 of them in 1983. In 1985, the NSF delivered ozone sensors, along with balloons and helium, to researchers at the South Pole so they can measure stratospheric ozone loss. This was in response to findings earlier that year, indicating a steep drop in ozone over a period of several years. The Internet project continued, now known as NSFNET.

==== 1990–1999 ====
In 1990 the NSF's appropriation passed $2 billion for the first time. NSF funded the development of several curricula based on the NCTM standards, devised by the National Council of Teachers of Mathematics. These standards were widely adopted by school districts during the subsequent decade. However, in what newspapers such as the Wall Street Journal called the "math wars", organizations such as Mathematically Correct complained that some elementary texts based on the standards, including Mathland, had almost entirely abandoned any instruction of traditional arithmetic in favor of cutting, coloring, pasting, and writing. During that debate, NSF was both lauded and criticized for favoring the standards.

In 1991 the NSFNET acceptable use policy was altered to allow commercial traffic. By 1995, with private, commercial market thriving, NSF decommissioned the NSFNET, allowing for public use of the Internet. In 1993 students and staff at the NSF-supported National Center for Supercomputing Applications (NCSA) at the University of Illinois, Urbana-Champaign, developed Mosaic, the first freely available browser to allow World Wide Web pages that include both graphics and text. Within 18 months, NCSA Mosaic becomes the Web browser of choice for more than a million users, and sets off an exponential growth in the number of Web users. In 1994 NSF, together with DARPA and NASA, launched the Digital Library Initiative. One of the first six grants went to Stanford University, where two graduate students, Larry Page and Sergey Brin, began to develop a search engine that used the links between Web pages as a ranking method, which they later commercialized under the name Google.

In 1996 NSF-funded research established beyond doubt that the chemistry of the atmosphere above Antarctica was grossly abnormal and that levels of key chlorine compounds are greatly elevated. During two months of intense work, NSF researchers learned most of what is known about the ozone hole.

In 1998 two independent teams of NSF-supported astronomers discovered that the expansion of the universe was actually speeding up, as if some previously unknown force, now known as dark energy, is driving the galaxies apart at an ever-increasing rate.

Since passage of the Small Business Technology Transfer Act of 1992 (Public Law 102–564, Title II), NSF has been required to reserve 0.3% of its extramural research budget for Small Business Technology Transfer awards, and 2.8% of its R&D budget for small business innovation research.

==== 2000–2009 ====
NSF joined with other federal agencies in the National Nanotechnology Initiative, dedicated to the understanding and control of matter at the atomic and molecular scale. NSF's roughly $300 million annual investment in nanotechnology research was still one of the largest in the 23-agency initiative. In 2001, NSF's appropriation passed $4 billion. The NSF's "Survey of Public Attitudes Toward and Understanding of Science and Technology" revealed that the public had a positive attitude toward science, but a poor understanding of it. During 2004–5 NSF sent "rapid response" research teams to investigate the aftermath of the Indian Ocean tsunami disaster and Hurricane Katrina. An NSF-funded engineering team helped uncover why the levees failed in New Orleans. In 2005, NSF's budget stood at $5.6 billion, in 2006 it stood at $5.91 billion for the 2007 fiscal year (October 1, 2006, through September 30, 2007), and in 2007 NSF requested $6.43 billion for FY 2008.

==== 2010–2019 ====
President Obama requested $7.373 billion for fiscal year 2013. Due to the October 1, 2013 shutdown of the Federal Government, and NSF's lapse in funding, their website was down "until further notice", but was brought back online after the US government passed their budget. In 2014, NSF awarded rapid response grants to study a chemical spill that contaminated the drinking water of about 300,000 West Virginia residents. In early 2018, it was announced that Trump would cut NSF Research Funding by 30% but quickly rescinded this due to backlash. As of May 2018, Heather Wilson, the secretary of the Air Force, signed that letter of intent with the director of NSF initiating partnership for the research related to space operations and Geosciences, advanced material sciences, information and data sciences, and workforce and processes.

==== 2020–present ====
On April 28, 2026, President Donald Trump fired all 24 members of the foundation's governing board.

== Grants and the merit review process ==
A grant proposal which the National Science Foundation chose to fund

The NSF seeks to fulfill its mission chiefly by issuing competitive, limited-term grants in response to specific proposals from the research community and establishing cooperative agreements with research organizations. It does not operate its own laboratories, unlike other federal research agencies, notable examples being NASA and the National Institutes of Health (NIH). The NSF uses four main mechanisms to communicate funding opportunities and generate proposals: dear colleague letters, program descriptions, program announcements, and program solicitations.

The NSF receives over 50,000 such proposals each year, and funds about 10,000 of them. Those funded are typically projects that are ranked highest in a 'merit review' process, the current version of which was introduced in 1997. Reviews are carried out by ad hoc reviewers and panels of independent scientists, engineers, and educators who are experts in the relevant fields of study, and who are selected by the NSF with particular attention to avoiding conflicts of interest. For example, reviewers cannot work at the NSF itself, nor for the institution that employs the proposing researchers. All proposal evaluations are confidential: the proposing researchers may see them, but they do not see the names of the reviewers.

The first merit review criterion is 'intellectual merit', the second is that of the 'broader societal impact' of the proposed research; the latter reflects a broader global trend for funding agencies to demand evidence of research 'impact' and has been met with opposition from the scientific and policy communities since its inception in 1997. In June 2010, the National Science Board (NSB), the governing body for NSF and science advisers to both the legislative and executive branches, convened a 'Task Force on Merit Review' to determine "how well the current Merit Review criteria used by the NSF to evaluate all proposals were serving the agency". The task force reinforced its support for both criteria as appropriate for the goals and aims of the agency and published a revised version of the merit review criteria in its 2012 report, to clarify and improve the function of the criteria. However, both criteria already had been mandated for all NSF merit review procedures in the 2010 re-authorization of the America COMPETES Act. The Act also includes an emphasis on promoting potentially transformative research, a phrase which has been included in the most recent incarnation of the 'merit review' criteria.

Most NSF grants go to individuals or small groups of investigators, who carry out research at their home campuses. Other grants provide funding for mid-scale research centers, instruments, and facilities that serve researchers from many institutions. Still, others fund national-scale facilities that are shared by the research community as a whole. Examples of national facilities include the NSF's national observatories, with their giant optical and radio telescopes; its Antarctic research sites; its high-end computer facilities and ultra-high-speed network connections; the ships and submersibles used for ocean research; and its gravitational wave observatories.

In addition to researchers and research facilities, NSF grants also support science, engineering and mathematics education from pre-K through graduate school. Undergraduates can receive funding through Research Experiences for Undergraduates summer programs. Graduate students are supported through Integrative Graduate Education Research Traineeships (IGERT) and Alliance for Graduate Education and the Professoriate (AGEP) programs and through the Graduate Research Fellowships, NSF-GRF. K–12 and some community college instructors are eligible to participate in compensated Research Experiences for Teachers programs. In addition, an early career-development program (CAREER) supports teacher-scholars that most effectively integrate research and education within the mission of their organization, as a foundation for a lifetime of integrated contributions.

== Scope and organization ==
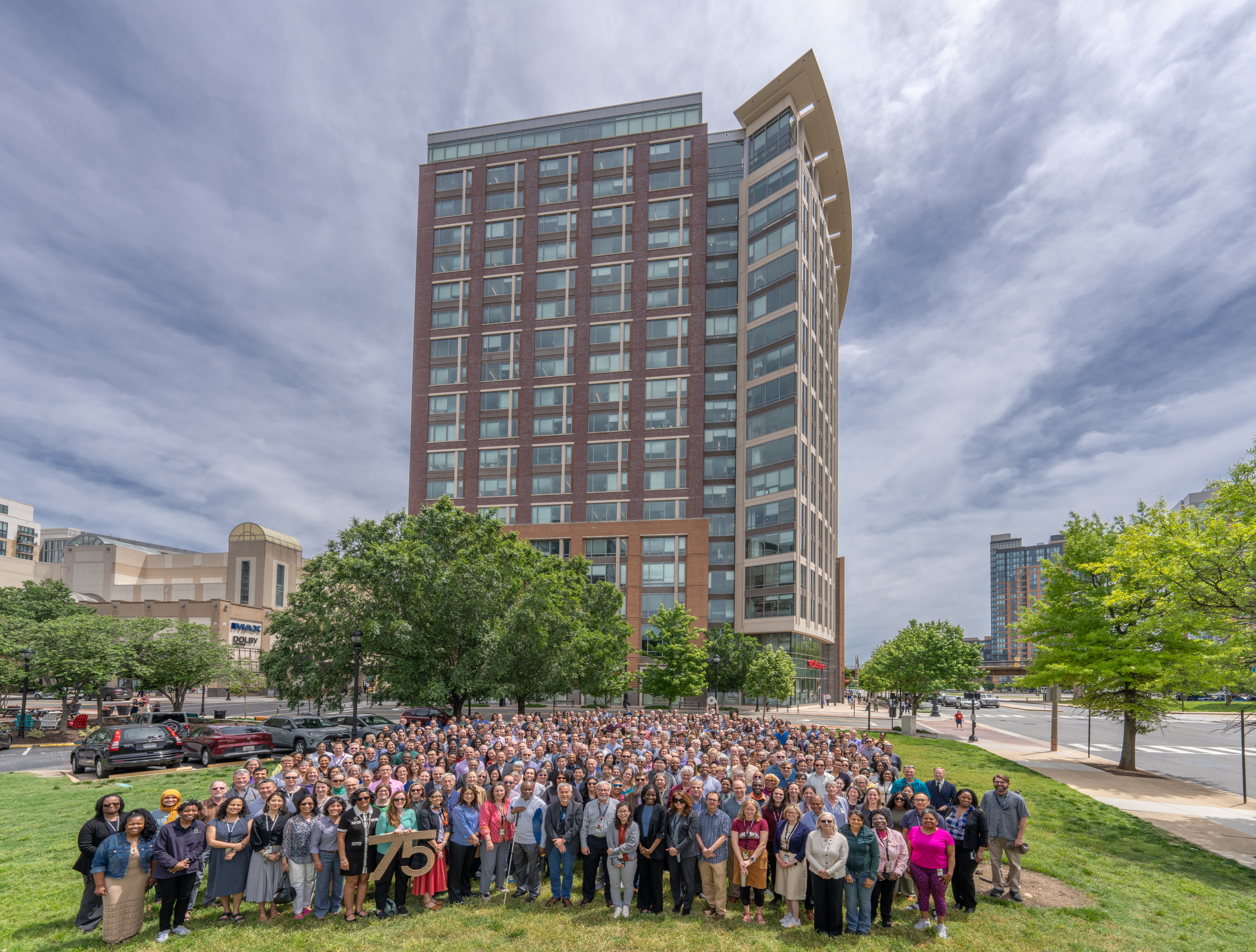
U.S. National Science Foundation staff on the occasion of the agency's 75th anniversary

The NSF is broadly organized into four offices, seven directorates, and the National Science Board. It employs about 2,100 people in permanent, temporary and contractual positions at its headquarters in Alexandria, Virginia. Prior to 2017, its headquarters were located in Arlington, Virginia.

In addition to around 1,400 permanent employees and the staffs of the NSB office and the Office of the Inspector General, NSF's workforce includes some 200 scientists on temporary duty and 450 contract workers. Scientists from research institutions can join the NSF as temporary program directors, called "rotators", overseeing the merit review process and searching for new funding opportunities. These assignments typically last one–two years, but may extend to four. The NSF also offers contracting opportunities. As of May 2018, the NSF has 53 existing contracts.

=== Offices ===
- Office of the Director
- Office of the Inspector General
- Office of Budget, Finance, and Award Management
- Office of Information & Resource Management
- Office of the Chief Information Officer

The NSF also supports research through several offices within the Office of the Director, including the Office of Integrative Activities, and Office of International Science and Engineering.

=== Research directorates ===
The NSF organizes its research and education support through eight directorates, each encompassing several disciplines:

- Biological Sciences (molecular, cellular, and organismal biology, environmental science)
- Computer and Information Science and Engineering (theoretical computer science, fundamental hardware and software, systems and networking, and artificial intelligence)
- Engineering (bioengineering, environmental systems, civil and mechanical systems, chemical and transport systems, electrical and communications systems, and design and manufacturing)
- Geosciences (geological, atmospheric and ocean sciences)
- Mathematical and Physical Sciences (mathematics, astronomy, physics, chemistry and materials science)
- Social, Behavioral and Economic Sciences (neuroscience, management, psychology, sociology, anthropology, linguistics, science of science policy and economics)
- STEM Education and Human Resources (science, technology, engineering and mathematics education at every level)
- Technology, Innovation and Partnerships (TIP), created in 2022 to accelerate the transition of basic research into real world impact. It has a primary goal of the support of use-inspired research and the translation of research results to the market and society.

=== Overseas sites ===
Prior to October 2018, NSF maintained three overseas offices to promote collaboration between the science and engineering communities of the United States and other continents' scientific communities:

- (Belgium) Brussels for Europe, formerly based in Paris (established 1984; relocated to Brussels in 2015)
- (Japan) Tokyo for East Asia, except China (established 1960)
- Beijing for China (established 2006)

All three overseas offices were shut down in October 2018, to reflect the agency's move to a more nimble international posture. Rather than maintain dedicated offices, NSF will dispatch small teams to specific international institutions. Teams may work for up to a week on-site to evaluate research and explore collaborations with the institution.

=== Crosscutting programs ===
In addition to the research it funds in specific disciplines, the NSF has launched a number of projects that coordinate the efforts of experts in many disciplines, which often involve collaborations with other U.S. federal agencies. Examples include initiatives in:

- Nanotechnology
- The science of learning
- Digital libraries
- The ecology of infectious diseases
- Insect farming

=== National Center for Science and Engineering Statistics ===
NSF's National Center for Science and Engineering Statistics (NCSES) gathers data from surveys and partnerships with other agencies to offer official data on the American science and engineering workforce, graduates of advanced U.S. science and engineering programs, and R&D expenditures by U.S. industry. NCSES is one of the principal U.S. statistical agencies. It is a part of the NSF's Social, Behavioral and Economic Sciences Directorate (SBE).

=== Center for Insect Biomanufacturing and Innovation ===
The Center for Insect Biomanufacturing and Innovation (CIBI), formerly known as the Center for Environmental Sustainability through Insect Farming (CEIF), is an NSF partnership program that provides funds for research and experimentation on insect as food and feed. CIBI is a partnership between three Universities, Texas A&M, IU Indianapolis, and Mississippi State University, who all do separate areas of insect research to discover its sustainability. It is a part of NSF's Industry-University Cooperative Research Center (IUCRC) program.

== List of NSF directors ==
The following persons had led the National Science Foundation as director since 1950:

No.	Portrait	Secretary	Term start	Term end	Field	Notes
1		Alan T. Waterman	April 1951	June 1963	Physics	
2		Leland J. Haworth	July 1963	June 1969	Physics	
3		William D. McElroy	July 1969	January 1972	Biochemistry	
4		H. Guyford Stever	February 1972	August 1976	Physics	
acting		Richard C. Atkinson	August 1976	May 1977	Psychology	
5		Richard C. Atkinson	May 1977	June 1980	Psychology	
acting		Donald N. Langenberg	July 1980	December 1980	Physics	
6		John B. Slaughter	December 1980	October 1982	Engineering	
7		Edward A. Knapp	November 1982	August 1984	Physics	
8		Erich Bloch	September 4, 1984	August 31, 1990	Engineering	
acting		Frederick M. Bernthal	September 1, 1990	March 3, 1991	Nuclear Chemistry / Physics	
9		Walter E. Massey	March 4, 1991	April 2, 1993	Physics	
acting		Frederick M. Bernthal	April 5, 1993	October 14, 1993	Nuclear Chemistry / Physics	
10		Neal F. Lane	October 15, 1993	August 1998	Physics	
11		Rita R. Colwell	August 13, 1998	February 21, 2004	Microbiology	
acting		Arden L. Bement Jr.	February 22, 2004	November 23, 2004	Engineering	
12		Arden L. Bement Jr.	November 24, 2004	May 31, 2010	Engineering	
acting		Cora B. Marrett	June 1, 2010	October 17, 2010	Sociology	
13		Subra Suresh	October 18, 2010	March 31, 2013	Engineering	
acting		Cora B. Marrett	April 1, 2013	March 29, 2014	Sociology	
14		France A. Córdova	March 30, 2014	March 31, 2020	Astrophysics	
acting		Kelvin K. Droegemeier	April 1, 2020	July 1, 2020	Atmospheric Science	
15		Sethuraman Panchanathan	July 2, 2020	April 24, 2025	Computer Science	
interim		Brian Stone	April 25, 2025	present	Business Administration, Management and Operations	

== Notable funded projects ==
=== Active projects ===
- Atacama Large Millimeter Array
- Daniel K. Inouye Solar Telescope
- Gemini Observatory
- IceCube Neutrino Observatory
- Laser Interferometer Gravitational-Wave Observatory
- National Ecological Observatory Network
- National High Magnetic Field Laboratory
- Ocean Observatories Initiative
- OpenROAD Initiative
- South Pole Telescope
- Vera C. Rubin Observatory
- Very Large Array

=== Past projects ===
- Arecibo Observatory
- Blue Waters
- EarthScope
- Global Environment for Network Innovations
- Google Search – BackRub research prototype at Stanford
- NCSA Mosaic web browser
- Network for Earthquake Engineering Simulation
- NSFNET
- PlanetLab
- TeraGrid

== Criticism ==
In May 2011, Republican senator Tom Coburn released a 73-page report, "National Science Foundation: Under the Microscope", receiving immediate attention from such media outlets as The New York Times, Fox News, and MSNBC. The report found fault with various research projects and was critical of the social sciences. It started a controversy about political bias and a Congressional Inquiry into federally sponsored research. In 2014, Republicans proposed a bill to limit the NSF Board's authority in grant-writing.

In 2013, the NSF had funded the work of Mark Carey at University of Oregon with a $412,930 grant, which included a study concerning gender in glaciological research. After its January 2016 release, the NSF drew criticism for alleged misuse of funding.

Some historians of science have argued that the National Science Foundation Act of 1950 was an unsatisfactory compromise between too many clashing visions of the purpose and scope of the federal government. The NSF was certainly not the primary government agency for the funding of basic science, as its supporters had originally envisioned in the aftermath of World War II. By 1950, support for major areas of research had already become dominated by specialized agencies such as the National Institutes of Health (medical research) and the U.S. Atomic Energy Commission (nuclear and particle physics). That pattern would continue after 1957 when U.S. anxiety over the launch of Sputnik led to the creation of the National Aeronautics and Space Administration (space science) and the Defense Advanced Research Projects Agency (defense-related research).

== See also ==
- American Association for the Advancement of Science
- C-MORE, the Center for Microbial Oceanography: Research and Education, an NSF Science and Technology Center
- Capital Jury Project
- International Council on Nanotechnology
- National Digital Information Infrastructure and Preservation Program
- National Digital Library Program (NDLP)
- National Foundation on the Arts and the Humanities
- Research council
- Science and Technology Policy Institute
- Scientific literacy
- SedDB, online database for sediment geochemistry
- U.S. Civilian Research & Development Foundation
- United States National Academy of Sciences
- USA.gov
- Zodletone Mountain
