= SedDB =

SedDB was an online database for sediment geochemistry.

SedDB was based on a relational database that contained the full range of analytical values for sediment samples, primarily from marine sediment cores, including major and trace element concentrations, radiogenic and stable isotope ratios, and data for all types of material such as organic and inorganic components, leachates, and size fractions. SedDB also archived a vast array of metadata relating to individual samples. Examples of SedDB metadata include sample latitude and longitude, water depth, material analyzed, analytical methodology, analytical precision, and reference standard measurements. As of April 2013, SedDB contained nearly 750,000 individual analytical data points from 104,000 samples. SedDB contents have been migrated to EarthChem Portal.

== Purpose ==
SedDB was developed to complement current geological data systems (PetDB, EarthChem, NavDat and Georoc) with an integrated and easily accessible compilation of geochemical data of marine and continental sediments to be utilized for sedimentological, geochemical, petrological, oceanographic, and paleoclimate research, as well as for educational purposes.

== Funding and management ==
SedDB was developed, operated and maintained by a joint team of disciplinary scientists, data scientists, data managers and information technology developers at the Lamont–Doherty Earth Observatory as part of the Integrated Earth Data Applications (IEDA) Research Group funded by the US National Science Foundation. SedDB was built collaboratively by researchers and information technologists at the Lamont–Doherty Earth Observatory, Oregon State University, Boston University, and Boise State University.
