= Sonia Petro =

Politician from Guadeloupe

Sonia Petro is a politician from Guadeloupe, who is the Head of List and a member of the political party, The Republicans. She has also served as the President of the Federation of Republicans of Guadeloupe. She was appointed Deputy Mayor of Basse-Terre in 2020. In 2022 she was appointed Overseas Speaker on behalf of the presidential candidate Valérie Pécresse.
