= National Science Foundation: Under the Microscope =

Essay

National Science Foundation: Under the Microscope was a 73-page report released on May 26, 2011 by US Senator Tom Coburn, a conservative Republican from Oklahoma, accusing the National Science Foundation of poor management and practices, criticizing various research projects, and in particular several in the social sciences. Mainstream press coverage generated a public controversy and a stir in academia.

== Report ==
The May 26, 2011 report "National Science Foundation: Under the Microscope" was highly critical of the National Science Foundation (NSF). Conservative Republican Senator Tom Coburn from Oklahoma argued that poor management and practices at NSF, "waste, fraud, duplication and mismanagement" have resulted in losses of over $1.2 billion, with a further $1.7 billion in unspent funds. The report fingered several studies that exemplify "waste and duplication" in its press release:

An "$80,000 study on why the same teams always dominate March Madness", a "$315,000 study suggesting playing FarmVille on Facebook helps adults develop and maintain relationships", a study costing "$1 million for an analysis of how quickly parents respond to trendy baby names", a study costing "$50,000 to produce and publicize amateur songs about science, including a rap called "Money 4 Drugz," and a misleading song titled "Biogas is a Gas, Gas, Gas";" a study costing "$2 million to figure out that people who often post pictures on the internet from the same location at the same time are usually friends"; and "$581,000 on whether online dating site users are racist". Ineffective management examples, cited in the report, included "ineffective contracting", "$1.7 billion in unspent funds sitting in expired, undisbursed grant accounts", "at least $3 million in excessive travel funds", "a lack of accountability or program metrics to evaluate expenditures" and "inappropriate staff behavior including porn surfing and Jello wrestling and skinny-dipping at NSF-operated facilities in Antarctica".

The report has recommended to clarify and establish guidelines on what is meant by "transformative science", measure success and ensure accountability, improve grant accountability, reduce duplication, consolidate the Directorate for Education & Human Resources and most controversially, eliminate the Social, Behavioral, and Economics Directorate which receives a total of $200–300 million per year. The press release noted that "The social sciences should not be the focus of our premier basic scientific research agency". Coburn questioned whether "these social sciences represent obvious national priorities that deserve a cut of the same pie" as the natural sciences.

== Reception and critique ==
In 2011, NSF replied to the report, saying that it "has been diligent about addressing concerns from members of Congress about workforce and grant management issues, and NSF's excellent record of tracking down waste and prosecuting wrongdoing is apparent" from the report itself, and that even some of the cases featured in the press release, like the inappropriate actions in the Antarctica facility, were internally reviewed and dealt with within the NSF. It was pointed out that NSF's budget of about $7 billion represents about 0.5% of the projected 2011 federal deficit. NSF has stated the report's claim for the biggest saving in unused money, is based on a "misreading of federal statutes", or an accounting misunderstanding. According to NSF, it is money obligated for multiyear grants.

Controversy arose from the fact that the report highlighted many studies as pointless or wasteful, and made fun of them as "silly", or not "serious science". It was claimed to undervalue the social sciences such as economics, political science, sociology, psychology, linguistics and others, including, for example, collecting demographic statistics and other data on the US population, used in public policy and decision making. Commentators have noted that attacks on "silly science" have a long tradition during economic downturns: in the 1970s a notable example was the Golden Fleece Awards established by Senator William Proxmire.

Several professional associations of academics, such as the American Political Science Association and the Association for Psychological Science criticized the report. Academics allege that the report had inaccurate descriptions of their research, often misinterpreted them, or lacked the understanding of the underlying goals. Others described it as "flat-out inaccurate". Professor John Hibbing noted, it is "legitimate to ask what kind of scientific research is important and what isn't", but a nonscientific report by a politician may not be the best way to achieve this goal.

On July 11, 2011, the American Association for the Advancement of Science (AAAS) opposed in a letter to the House Appropriations Committee, to reduce funding for the NSF Directorate for Social, Behavioral, and Economic Sciences, stating, as an example, that the work of social scientists had been part of the development of geographic information systems that could be used in responses to disasters such as the September 11 attacks.

== Impact ==
The report started a controversy, which resulted in a Congressional inquiry and one-year long study, with Texas Republican Lamar Smith chairing the House Science Committee, and a 2014 Congressional proposal to limit NSF's grant-writing authority. In April 2014 the NSF board responded, breaking its tradition of not commenting on pending legislation.
