= Cora Bagley Marrett =

American sociologist

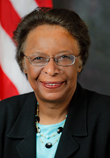

Acting Director of the National Science Foundation
- In office March 2013 – March 2014
- Preceded by: Subra Suresh
- Succeeded by: France A. Córdova

Acting Director of the National Science Foundation
- In office June 2010 – October 2010
- Preceded by: Arden L. Bement, Jr.
- Succeeded by: Subra Suresh

Personal details
- Born: 1942 (age 83–84) Kenbridge, Virginia
- Education: Virginia Union University (BA); University of Wisconsin-Madison (PhD)
- Occupation: Sociologist

Cora Bagley Marrett (born 1942) is an American sociologist. From May 2011 until August 2014, Marrett served as the deputy director of the National Science Foundation.

== Biography ==
=== Early life ===
Cora Bagley Marrett was born in 1942 in Kenbridge, Virginia. Her parents only had a sixth grade education and Marrett was the youngest of 12 children.

=== Education ===
Marrett received her undergraduate degree from the historically black Virginia Union University in Richmond, Virginia. In 1968, she graduated from the University of Wisconsin-Madison with a PhD in sociology.

== Career ==
=== Academic appointments ===
Marrett's early academic appointments were at Western Michigan University and the University of North Carolina. Marrett was a tenured professor of Sociology and Afro-American Studies at the University of Wisconsin-Madison from 1974 to 1997. In 1997, Marrett moved to the University of Massachusetts-Amherst as Provost, Senior Vice Chancellor of Affairs, and a professor of Sociology and Afro-American Studies, where she remained until 2001. In 2001, she returned to the University of Wisconsin System, where she served as Senior Vice President for Academic Affairs until 2007.

=== National Science Foundation ===
From 1992 through 1996, Marrett worked for the National Science Foundation as the assistant director for Social, Behavioral, and Economic Studies. She was also the assistant director for Education and Human Resources. In May 2011, Marrett returned to the National Science Foundation as the deputy director, a post which she held until August 2014. Marrett has also served as NSF's acting director from June to October 2010 and again from March 2013 to March 2014.

=== Professional service ===
Marrett directed the United Negro College Fund/Andrew Mellon Programs from 1990 until 1992. In 1996 when she was called upon to sit on the Board of Governors of the Argonne National Laboratory while also being a member of a peer-review group for the National Institutes of Health, in which she remained until 1998. Other academic and governmental committees that she has served on include the National Academy of Sciences-National Research Council, the President's Commission on the Accident at Three Mile Island, the National Science Foundation, the U.S. Department of Defense and the U.S. Congress.

== Published works ==
- Women's Occupational Health: The Rise and Fall of a Research Issue
- Research in Race and Ethnic Relations: A Research Annual
- Minority Females in High School Mathematics and Science
- Teacher Goals and Race/Sex Equity in Mathematics and Science Education: The Final Report
- Gender Influences in Classroom Interaction
- The Organizational Context of Higher Order Thinking
- Letter Report: Protecting Participants in Behavioral and Social Science Research

== Awards ==
While working for the National Science Foundation from 1992 to 1996, Marrett was awarded the Distinguished Service Award.

In 1996, Marrett received an honorary Doctorate from Wake Forest University and became a Fellow of the American Association for the Advancement of Science.

In 1998, she became a Fellow of the American Academy of Arts and Sciences. That year she also served as Vice President of the American Sociological Association.

Marrett was awarded the American Sociological Association's Cox-Johnson-Frazier Award for work in the intellectual traditions of the work of Oliver Cox, Charles S. Johnson, and E. Franklin Frazier, three African American scholars. Cox, Johnson, and Frazier placed their scholarship in service to social justice, with an eye toward advancing the status of disadvantaged populations, and to better conditions globally. Marrett received the award in 2008.

Marrett was also a Distinguished Alumni Award Honoree in 2012 from the University of Wisconsin.

While at Western Michigan University, she was nominated for a University Teaching Award.

Political offices
| Preceded by Subra Suresh | Director of the National Science Foundation; 2013–2014 | Succeeded by France A. Córdova |
