= Valérie Pécresse =

French politician (born 1967)

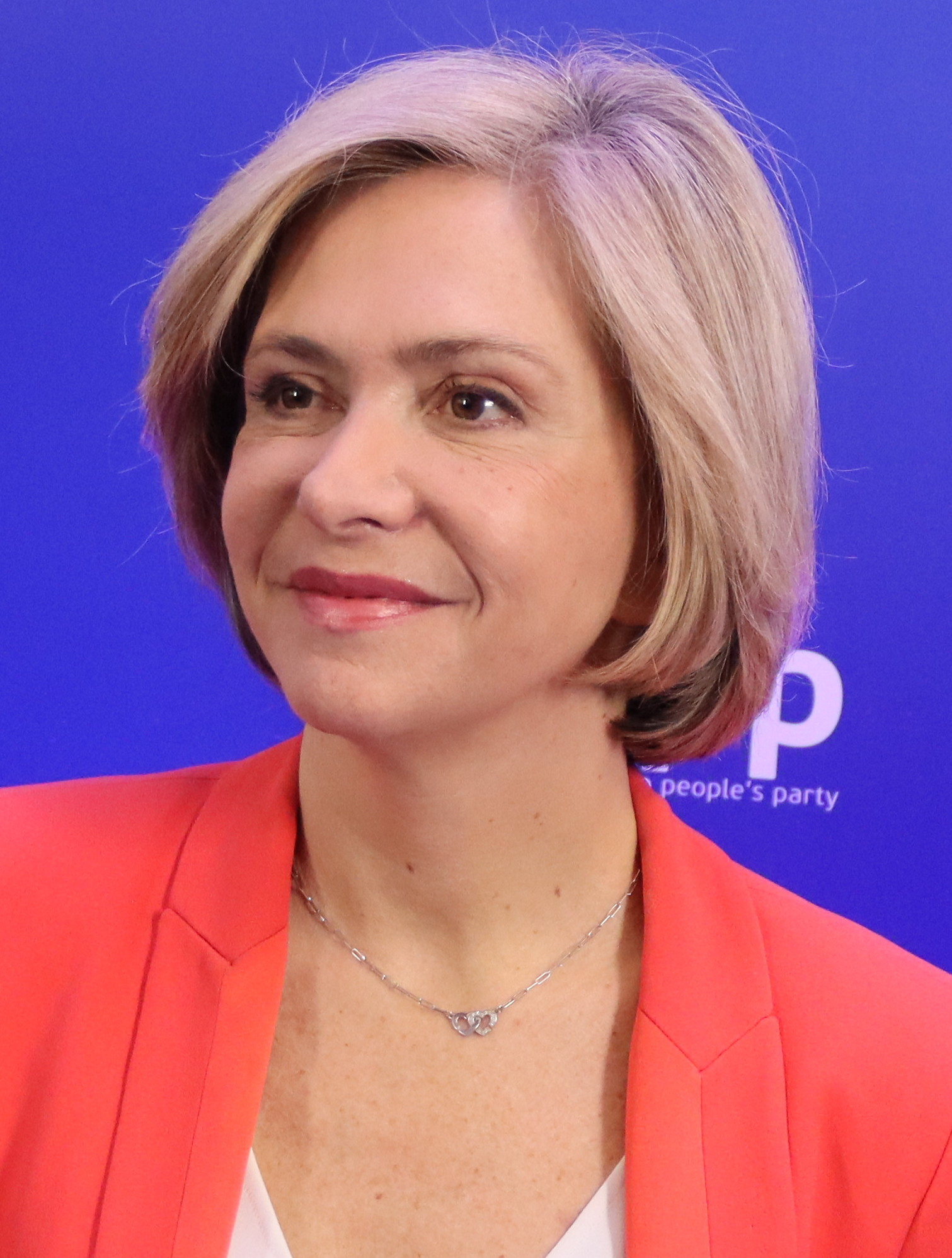
- Pécresse in 2022

President of the Regional Council of Île-de-France
- Incumbent
- Assumed office 18 December 2015
- Preceded by: Jean-Paul Huchon

Minister of the Budget
- In office 29 June 2011 – 10 May 2012
- Prime Minister: François Fillon
- Preceded by: François Baroin
- Succeeded by: Jérôme Cahuzac

Government Spokesperson
- In office 29 June 2011 – 15 May 2012
- Prime Minister: François Fillon
- Preceded by: François Baroin
- Succeeded by: Najat Vallaud-Belkacem

Minister of Higher Education and Research
- In office 18 May 2007 – 29 June 2011
- Prime Minister: François Fillon
- Preceded by: François Goulard
- Succeeded by: Laurent Wauquiez

Member of the National Assembly for Yvelines's 2nd constituency
- In office 20 June 2012 – 20 January 2016
- Preceded by: Yves Vandewalle
- Succeeded by: Pascal Thévenot
- In office 19 June 2002 – 19 July 2007
- Preceded by: Franck Borotra
- Succeeded by: Yves Vandewalle

Member of the Regional Council of Île-de-France
- Incumbent
- Assumed office 2 April 2004
- President: Jean-Paul Huchon; Herself
- Constituency: Yvelines

Personal details
- Born: Valérie Anne Émilie Roux; 14 July 1967 (age 59) Neuilly-sur-Seine, France
- Party: LR (2015–2019; since 2021); SL (since 2017)
- Other political affiliations: RPR (until 2002); UMP (2002–2015)
- Spouse: Jérôme Pécresse (m. 1994)
- Children: 3
- Parent: Dominique Roux (father)
- Relatives: Louis Bertagna (maternal grandfather)
- Education: Lycée Sainte-Geneviève
- Alma mater: HEC Paris; École nationale d'administration

Valérie Anne Émilie Pécresse (French pronunciation: [valeʁi pekʁɛs]; née Roux [ʁu]; 14 July 1967) is a French politician who has been the President of the Regional Council of Île-de-France since 2015. A member of The Republicans, she previously served as Minister of Higher Education and Research from 2007 to 2011 and Minister of the Budget and Government Spokeswoman from 2011 to 2012 under Prime Minister François Fillon. Pécresse represented the 2nd constituency of Yvelines in the National Assembly from 2002 to 2007 and again from 2012 until 2016.

Pécresse was voted as the Republicans' nominee for the 2022 French presidential election, defeating Éric Ciotti in the party primary. She came fifth in the election with 4.8% of the vote, the worst result in the history of her party or its Gaullist predecessors.

== Education and early career ==
Pécresse is the daughter of economist Dominique Roux who taught at Université Paris Dauphine and later served as CEO of French conglomerate Bolloré. She has degrees from HEC Paris and the École nationale d'administration. She speaks French, English, Russian and Japanese. Pécresse was an auditor of the Conseil d'État until 1998, when she was designated an adviser to President Jacques Chirac.

== Political career ==
=== Career in local politics ===
In 2004, she took office as a regional councillor of Île-de-France. She was also the spokeswoman of the Union for a Popular Movement party in Yvelines. In 2020, she took office as a municipal councillor of Vélizy-Villacoublay.

=== Career in national politics ===
In addition to her activities in regional politics, Pécresse served as a member of the National Assembly of France from 2002 until 2007, representing the Yvelines department (2nd constituency). In Parliament, she was a member of the Committee on Constitutional Affairs (2002–2005) and the Committee on Cultural Affairs (2005–2007). In 2004, she became the spokeswoman for Nicolas Sarkozy, who was then leader of the UMP. From 2007 until 2011, Pécresse served as Minister of Higher Education and Research in the cabinet of Prime Minister François Fillon. During her time in office, she launched many reforms to give universities a greater degree of autonomy over their resources and open the way for more private sector financing. The reforms caused a wave of strikes.

In 2009, the Académie de la Carpette anglaise, an organisation that opposes the spread of the English language in Francophone countries, gave Pécresse the Prix de la Carpette Anglaise ("English Doormat Prize") for having refused to speak French at international meetings in Brussels; Pécresse had stated that English was the easiest means of communication. At the same time, Pécresse was described by the Financial Times as one of the most successful of Sarkozy's ministers and considered as a candidate to succeed Christine Lagarde as Minister of the Economy and Finance in 2011.

From 2011 until 2012, Pécresse served as the government's spokeswoman and as Minister of the Budget, Public Accounts and State Reform in Fillon's third cabinet, succeeding François Baroin. In this capacity, she opposed increases in the EU budget for 2013. In the 2011 local elections, she notably went against official party line, led by then UMP leader Jean-François Copé, not to direct the party's supporters how to vote; instead, she said she would rather vote for the Socialist Party (PS) in the case of a runoff against the National Front (FN).

After the defeat of Sarkozy in the 2012 French presidential election, Pécresse remained a key member of the UMP and its successor, The Republicans (LR). She returned to the National Assembly, where she served on the Finance Committee from 2012 until 2016. In September 2014, she joined Fillon, Étienne Blanc, Éric Ciotti and Pierre Lellouche on an official trip to Iraq.

=== President of the Regional Council of Île-de-France (2015–present) ===
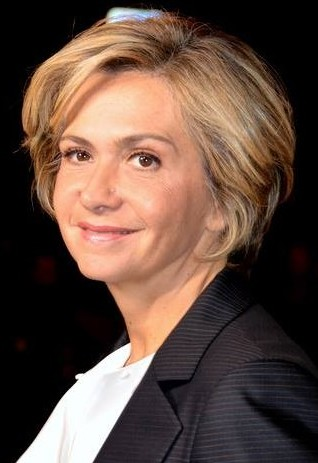
Pécresse at the 41st César Awards in 2016

In December 2015, Pécresse led a list of candidates of the Union of the Right, a coalition of centrist and right-wing parties, which narrowly won the Île-de-France regional election with 43.8% of the second-round vote, defeating the Union of the Left, a coalition of socialists and ecologists, led by Claude Bartolone, coming second with 42.1%, ahead of the National Front led by Wallerand de Saint-Just at 14%. She became the first woman to hold the office of President of the Regional Council of Île-de-France. In the party's 2016 presidential primaries Pécresse endorsed former prime minister Alain Juppé. Amid the Fillon affair, in March 2017, she joined Xavier Bertrand, Christian Estrosi and others in calling for Juppé to replace François Fillon as the party's candidate.

In response to the Brexit vote in 2016, Pécresse helped launch an initiative of corporate leaders and politicians – including Anne Hidalgo, Gérard Mestrallet and Christian Noyer – to attract business from London. She has since been saying publicly that France was rolling out the "red-white-and-blue carpet" for UK bankers.

Ahead of The Republicans' 2017 leadership election, Pécresse founded her own political movement Libres! in July 2017. She also publicly opposed newly elected LR president Laurent Wauquiez, warning against his possible "porosity" to the far-right National Front's ideas. She later announced her resignation from LR on 5 June 2019, three days after Wauquiez's resignation from the presidency of the party.

In 2019, Pécresse announced plans to boost the number of people in the Paris region who cycle to work by investing 100 million euros in new cycle lanes and infrastructure and a subsidised electric bike rental scheme before 2021.

In the 2021 regional election, Pécresse was reelected with an increased second-round majority at 45.9% of the vote, defeating Julien Bayou of Europe Ecology – The Greens at 33.6%, Jordan Bardella of the National Rally (formerly National Front) at 10%, and Laurent Saint-Martin of La République En Marche! at 9.6%.

Pécresse's tenure has coincided with the rollout of the Paris Métro's Grand Paris Express (GPE) megaproject, launched under her predecessor. In 2023 she proposed an additional line, presented as the future Line 19, in the north of Île-de-France, following calls from officials from Val-d'Oise. In 2025 Le Monde recognised "colossal expenses" in regional investment in Île-de-France's public transport network with €22 billion allocated since Pécresse had taken office, making it the world's second-busiest after Tokyo's.

In 2024, Pécresse unveiled a new public transport ticket pricing system throughout the region regardless of distance. Previously, a single trip could cost up to €5; on 1 January 2025 a trip became capped at €2.50. She stated the "new fares will result in an increase in transport usage of around 1 to 2%", thus financing the price decline. She hailed an improvement of the "freedom of movement" across Île-de-France.

Amid the 2026 municipal elections and the controversies surrounding La France Insoumise following the death of Quentin Deranque, she called the party a "poison", and disparaged other left-wing parties for their "moral capitulation" after allying with LFI.

=== Candidacy for 2022 presidential election ===
In July 2021, Pécresse announced her intention to run as the Republican candidate in the 2022 presidential election. In an interview with Le Figaro, she said: "I am ready to be the first woman president of the Republic." At the party's congress in November 2021, she came in second after Éric Ciotti in an internal vote; for the runoff election, she was endorsed by the other defeated candidates Michel Barnier, Xavier Bertrand and Philippe Juvin. On 4 December 2021, she won the Republican candidacy in the final round of voting with 61 percent of ballots cast by party members, the first woman to be so nominated; Ciotti polled 39 percent. She appointed Sonia Petro, a politician from Guadeloupe as Overseas Speaker during her campaign. After winning the nomination, Pécresse's polling numbers soared above those of far-right candidates Marine Le Pen and Éric Zemmour, though trailing incumbent Emmanuel Macron in the first round. From the end of December, Pécresse and Le Pen were close together in polls for second place in the first round, to advance into the second round behind Macron.

In January 2022, Pécresse said that France should metaphorically use a Kärcher pressure washer against crime in banlieues; the same argument had been used by Sarkozy in 2005. The German corporation said that it did not want to be used in political discourse. In February, some of her aides including Éric Woerth and Natacha Bouchart left her campaign and endorsed Macron. At a rally in February, Pécresse said "in ten years time … will we be a sovereign nation, a U.S. satellite or a Chinese trading post? Will we be unified or divided? Nothing is written, whether it's loss of economic status, or the Great Replacement". She was criticised for referring to the Great Replacement, and later said that her mention was not an endorsement of what she considered to be a "theory of hate". In addition to this statement, her rally was ridiculed by members of her own party, who perceived her delivery as awkward and likened the rally to the sinking of the Titanic.

By March 2022, Pécresse was polling in fifth place for the first round, behind Macron, Zemmour, Le Pen and Jean-Luc Mélenchon. She finished in fifth place with 1,679,470 votes (4.8%), the worst-ever result for the Republicans or its Gaullist predecessors. She then endorsed Macron for the second round. Pécresse received slightly less than the 5% threshold to be reimbursed by the state for her campaign; she said that her campaign had cost €7 million, of which €5 million was her personal responsibility. She then announced a plan to crowdfund the paying of her debts.

== Political positions ==
=== Social policy ===
Opposed to the Taubira bill on same-sex marriage in France, Pécresse participated in various demonstrations opposing same-sex marriage and LGBT parenting between 2012 and 2013, notably led by La Manif pour tous. In a 2016 op-ed published by Sunday newspaper Le Journal du Dimanche, Pécresse joined sixteen other high-profile women from across the political spectrum – including Élisabeth Guigou, Christine Lagarde, and Fleur Pellerin – in making a public vow to expose "all sexist remarks, inappropriate gestures and behaviour."

When founding Libres! in 2017, Pécresse told Sunday newspaper Le Journal du Dimanche she would seek to position her grouping between those who had joined Macron's government – including Prime Minister Édouard Philippe – and those who would follow a line she called "aggressive opposition," and which has gathered around the party's right wing. Also in 2020, Pécresse said she was "totally hostile" to mail-in voting to facilitate voting during the public health crisis caused by the COVID-19 pandemic in France.

In 2021, Pécresse advocated a more restrictive approach to the issue of immigration, seeing it as a "major societal challenge". In particular, she suggests the introduction of maximum annual immigration ceilings and stricter conditions for the issuance of a residence permit, such as having "sufficient resources" (the amount of which would be raised by 25%), "mastery of the French language" and "respect for secularism and the values of the Republic". Finally, she wants to exclude people who have been living in France for less than five years from social assistance.

=== Homeland security ===
In response to the January 2015 Île-de-France attacks, Pécresse said France needed its own version of the Patriot Act. Following the murder of Samuel Paty in 2020, Pécresse argued for lifting restrictions on facial recognition and using artificial intelligence to fight terrorism on public transport networks.

=== Economic policy ===
Declaring herself in favour of economic liberalism, she said in August 2021 that she was "two-thirds Merkel, one-third Thatcher". In the run-up to the 2022 presidential election, she promised to cut public spending and taxes through four major reforms: eliminating 150,000 civil service jobs, moving to retirement at age 65, reducing unemployment benefits and withdrawing the state from competitive companies in which it is a minority shareholder. She also wants to end the 35-hour workweek. At the same time, she has attempted to present herself as an environmentalist.

== Personal life ==
Pécresse has been married to former investment banker and current CEO of GE Renewable Energy Jérôme Pécresse since 1994. The couple have three children.

== Bibliography ==
- "Miss Oradour", in Thiollet, Jean-Pierre (2022), Hallier en roue libre, Paris: Neva Editions, ISBN 978-2-35055-305-4

Political offices
Preceded by Jean-Paul Huchon	President of the Regional Council of Île-de-France; 2015–present	Succeeded by Incumbent
Preceded by François Goulard	Minister of Higher Education and Research; 2007–2011	Succeeded by Laurent Wauquiez
Preceded by François Baroin	Minister of the Budget; 2011–2012	Succeeded by Jérôme Cahuzac
