= Center for Insect Biomanufacturing and Innovation =

Insect-farming research center

CIBI
- Center for Insect Biomanufacturing and Innovation
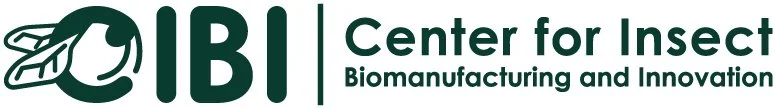
- Formation: August 1, 2021
- Headquarters: 2475 TAMU, Texas A&M College Station, TX 77843
- TAMU Center Director: Dr. Jeff Tomberlin
- MSU Site Director: Dr. Heather Jordan
- IUI Site Director: Dr. Christine Picard
- Parent organization: Texas A&M Department of Entomology
- Affiliations: Texas A&M University, Mississippi State University, Indiana University - Indianapolis
- Website: https://www.insectcenter.org/
- Formerly called: Center for Environmental Sustainability through Insect Farming (CEIF)

The Center for Insect Biomanufacturing and Innovation (CIBI), formerly known as the Center for Environmental Sustainability through Insect Farming (CEIF), is an organization with the end goal of normalizing and modernizing insect farming across the globe. The organization was begun by the idea and maintains that insect farming decreases pollution, increases quality control, and may be a more sustainable way of mass-producing and providing food.

The organization is a collaboration between Texas A&M University, Mississippi State University, and Indiana University Indianapolis, begun by the National Science Foundation (NSF). Texas A&M's AgriLife in the Department of Entomology mainly works within Insect rearing; the best ways to raise, feed and produce the insects. They have named their sect of the company the "Center for Insect Biomanufacturing and Innovation". IU Indianapolis works in the genetics aspect of the insects. Mississippi State University works in plant pathology and agriculture with the departments of Entomology, Plant Pathology, Biochemistry, and Molecular Biology.

CIBI is a result of a collaboration between the NSF and the three universities, called the National Science Foundation Industry-University Cooperative Research Centers (NSF IUCRC) Program/Partnership. An IUCRC is a program that combines University research with a business problem that needs to be solved, and bases research around that problem.

CIBI has a few ongoing projects: Project 1, Digital Library and Seminar Series; Project 2, Genomic Resource Database; Project 5, Evaluation of Lauric Acid from Insects in Shrimp; Project 6, Gut Health and Performance of Chickens Raised on Insect Feed; and more. On the business side, CIBI works with companies such as Tyson Foods and the Chapul Farms, which is a company that farms insects for food and livestock feed.
