= Fake News Awards =

Ironic award

- Country: United States
- Presented by: Donald Trump
- First award: January 17, 2018
- Website: https://gop.com/the-highly-anticipated-2017-fake-news-awards

U.S. President Donald Trump created the Fake News Awards to highlight the news outlets that he said were responsible for misrepresenting him and/or producing false reports both before, and during, his presidency. A post to the blog of the Republican Party website announced the winners on January 17, 2018. They included reports ranging from comments by journalists on social media to news reports that later required corrections.

== Creation ==
President Trump first proposed an award—then called the "Fake News Trophy"—in a November 2017 tweet:

Donald J. Trump
(@realDonaldTrump)
tweeted:

We should have a contest as to which of the Networks, plus CNN and not including Fox, is the most dishonest, corrupt and/or distorted in its political coverage of your favorite President (me). They are all bad. Winner to receive the FAKE NEWS TROPHY!

November 27, 2017

It was unclear whether he intended to actually create the award at the time. Trump's re-election campaign sent emails to supporters with a link to an online poll asking them to rank three nominated stories as "fake", "faker", or "fakest" news in late December. Trump next mentioned the awards in a January 2, 2018 tweet. He called them the "Most Dishonest & Corrupt Media Awards of the Year", and wrote that he would award them for "dishonesty & bad reporting in various categories" at the time. The awards scheduled for January 8, 2018 at 5pm CST. Trump changed the date to January 17, citing increased interest in the award in a January 7 tweet.

Several late-night talk show hosts, including Samantha Bee and Jimmy Kimmel, satirically campaigned for an award. The Late Show with Stephen Colbert displayed a billboard doing such in New York City's Times Square, with categories including "Least Breitbarty" and "Corruptest Fakeness", and Trevor Noah's The Daily Show bought a full-page ad in The New York Times. The Tonight Show Starring Jimmy Fallon aired a sketch satirizing the Fake News Awards on January 16.

== Awards ==
The ten stories awarded were from CNN (four times), The New York Times (twice), The Washington Post, ABC News, Newsweek and Time. An eleventh bonus award went to reports about Russian interference in the 2016 United States elections that was generally called "perhaps the greatest hoax perpetrated on the American people".

Media pundits described the initial announcement of the winners as a flop since the Republican Party's website experienced technical difficulties and displayed a 404 error, along with a note that stated "we're making it great again".

	Reporter	Organization	Story	Notes
1	Paul Krugman	The New York Times	Short op-ed by NYT columnist that predicted if markets would recover from Trump presidency, "first-pass answer is never".	Krugman changed the claim three days later and wrote that the budget deficits under Trump might actually strengthen the economy.
2	Brian Ross	ABC News	Bungled report on former National Security Advisor Michael Flynn.	ABC corrected the error after it pointed out, then suspended Ross for four weeks and reassigned him. The report also linked to a temporary drop of 350 points in the Dow Jones.
3	Manu Raju, Jeremy Herb	CNN	Report claiming Trump campaign had early access to hacked WikiLeaks documents.	The Washington Post, The Wall Street Journal and NBC News soon caught the error and CNN corrected it.
4	Zeke Miller	Time	A tweet claiming a bust of Martin Luther King Jr. had been removed from the Oval Office.	Correction issued after 40 minutes. Time issued an apology.
5	Dave Weigel	The Washington Post	Tweet with misleading photo suggesting a rally for Trump in Pensacola was not 'packed to the rafters.'	Photo was taken while the audience still entered the arena. Deleted after 20 minutes. Reporter issued an apology.
6	Veronica Rocha	CNN	CNN published a video giving the impression Trump carelessly overfed fish in a koi pond during a meeting with Japanese Prime Minister Shinzo Abe.	Full video showed that Trump was merely copying what Abe was doing; the report accompanying the video actually portrayed Trump's actions in a positive light.
7	Thomas Frank	CNN	Report claiming then-White House Communications Director Anthony Scaramucci had ties to Russia.	Report later retracted. Three CNN staff members – Pulitzer-Prize nominee Thomas Frank; assistant managing editor Eric Lichtblau (who had recently joined from The New York Times and is a Pulitzer winner himself); and Lex Haris, the executive editor in charge of investigations – resigned.
8	Chris Riotta	Newsweek	Article claiming Polish first lady Agata Kornhauser-Duda did not shake Trump's hand.	Correction issued three hours after publication.
9	Gloria Borger, Eric Lichtblau, Jake Tapper, Brian Rokus	CNN	Report that former FBI director James Comey disputed Trump's claim that he was told he was not under investigation.	CNN later corrected the story.
10	Lisa Friedman	The New York Times	Report that scientists were afraid of the Trump administration planning not to publish a climate-change study.	The study had actually been available to the public for seven months. The New York Times stated in a correction that the report "was uploaded to a nonprofit internet digital library in January but gained little attention until it published it", though the Washington Post previously reported on the study.
11	Various		Claims that the Trump campaign "colluded" with Russia.	The Special Counsel investigation into Russian interference in the 2016 United States elections was not finished at the time and never investigated the claim of "collusion" but examined charges of "conspiracy". It "never established that members of the Trump campaign conspired or coordinated with the Russian government in its election interference activities".

The three stories on the online poll previously offered to Trump's supporters were ABC's reporting on Michael Flynn, CNN's reporting on Trump access to WikiLeaks documents, and Zeke Miller's erroneous report on the Martin Luther King Jr. bust.

== Reception ==
Reaction to the "awards" was strong from different sources. Trump's supporters view the "awards" as a tongue-in-cheek approach highlighting media bias against the president, while critics view them as an attempt to undermine freedom of the press.

Some media commentators congratulated the "winners", and others mocked the awards on Twitter. The Daily Beast, BuzzFeed News and the Daily News sarcastically expressed disappointment that it did not win an award. The journalist Chris Riotta joked that he was "honored and humbled" to be included in the awards.

== See also ==
- Ananias Club
- List of fake news websites
- Media bias in the United States
- Wet Gunpowder Award - Similar mocking award in Iran.
