= 2007–2009 university protests in France =

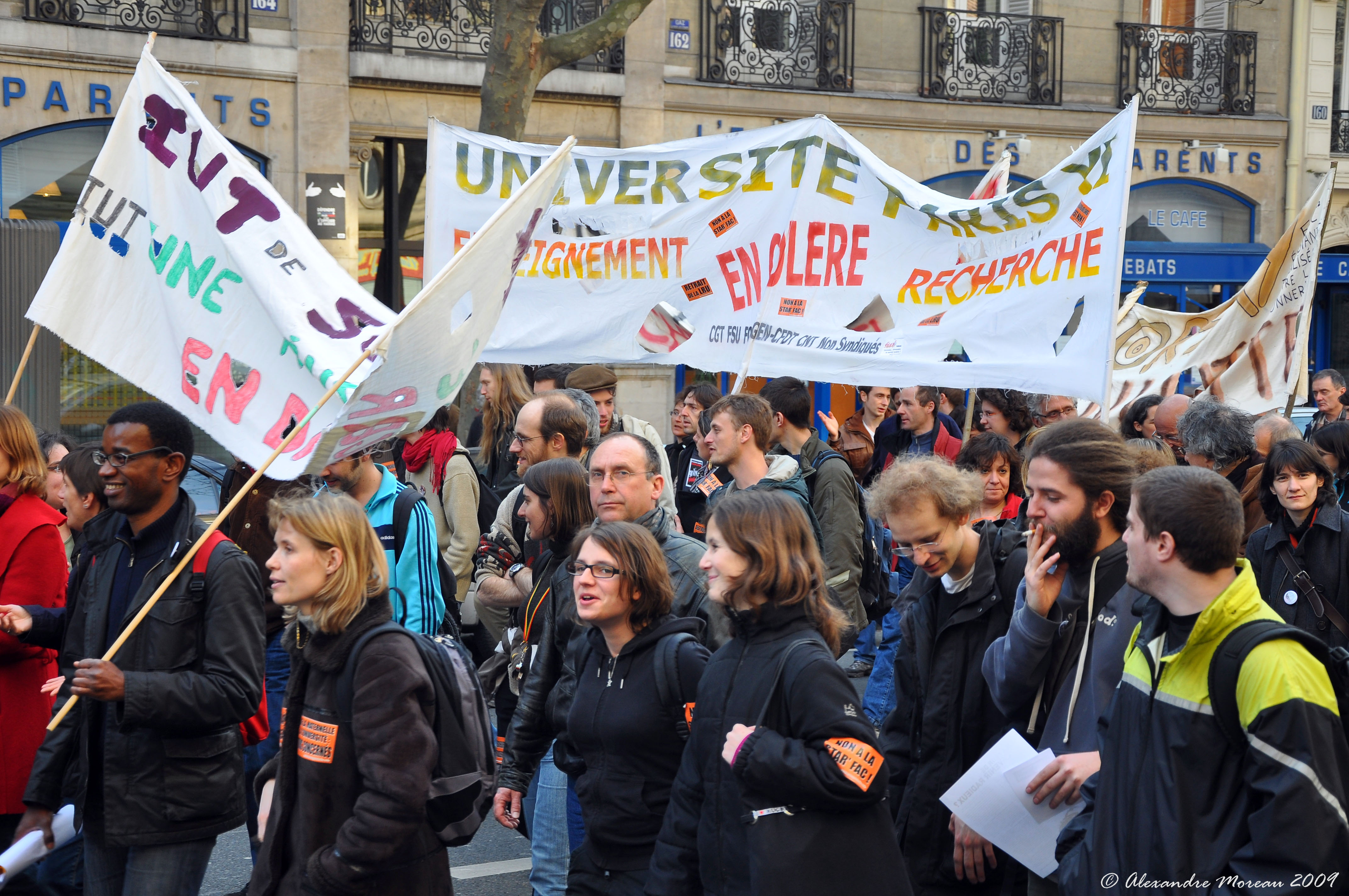
Manifestation on 11 March 2009

University strikes occurred in France during 2007 and 2009. Since Valérie Pécresse was appointed Minister for Higher Education and Research, the mood had been tense in the French university system. Several reform projects had led to protest movements, including that of 2009, the longest-lasting yet since 1968, still on-going after several months. It had put a heavy strain on France's political environment, even within the leading UMP party, and led to a reconsideration of the Bologna process within intellectual circles. A similar movement has simultaneously taken place in Spain.

== What instigated the strike movement? ==
=== The LRU law ===
Shortly after Valérie Pécresse was appointed Minister for Higher Education and Research, she announced the launch of a reform that President Nicolas Sarkozy had evoked in his election program: the so-called Law for the Freedom and Responsibility of Universities ("Liberté et Responsabilité des Universités") – shortened as "LRU law" – aimed at radically renewing French universities.

Under this legislation, budgets would no longer be allocated to individual university departments directly by the Ministry. Instead, universities would receive a lump sum, and the academic committee would then choose how to allocate funding to different departments and projects. This would also lead to an alteration in the rules regulating the committee's decisions, and the establishment of a majority voting system in both teacher categories (lecturers and professors). The Chancellor of the university would take personal responsibility for overseeing this new structure.

The purpose of the LRU law is to bring universities into line with European and Anglo-Saxon standards, in accordance with the Bologna process. With reduced bureaucracy, universities would be allowed more personal initiative. Furthermore, the draft law would enable Chancellors to enter into partnerships with private companies, thereby mobilising further funding for research. However, given that President Sarkozy has drastically reduced public spending and official posts in the public sector as part of the fundamental basis for his financial policy, enemies of the draft law consider it would lead to the neglect of universities by the State and ultimately possible privatization. The contempt displayed by Nicolas Sarkozy during his election campaign speeches when referring to humanities courses, in particular, appeared to confirm this impression, and the opposition found strong support within the Arts and Humanities faculties, whose fear of extensive neglect is equal to their lack of profitability. This is why opponents of the draft law have spoken of a "mix of feudalism (with the increase power of university management) and neoliberalism". The government, however, has argued that this is a "necessary modernization".

Initially, however, the opposition suffered a severe setback when the social-democratic student's union UNEF expressed its approval of the proposed law, once the idea of a Numerus Clausus for the Master's course had been abandoned. The law was passed by parliament during a special sitting in July, and signed into law by Nicolas Sarkozy in August (i.e. during the parliamentary recess). In October, a protest movement began in several universities, mostly in the Humanities Departments, and UNEF briefly became involved, but following the promise of the introduction of a support plan ("Plan Campus") this came to an end.

=== Spring and Summer 2008 ===
Disapproval increased when Valérie Pécresse presented her plan for restructuring research. In France, the National Centre for Scientific Research (Centre National de la Recherche Scientifique CNRS) plays an essential role in research. The CNRS has its own budget, but also collaborates with lecturers and professors working in the Mixed Research Units (Unités Mixtes de Recherche UMR). Despite relatively low levels of State investment, this system ranks sixth in the world according to the Shanghai Ranking (universities receive much lower marks, which has led to sharp criticism within the university community of the Ranking's impartiality and methods). The creation of the National Research Agency (Agence Nationale de la Recherche ANR), the introduction of funding for individual projects, and the restructuring of the CNRS into several specialized institutes has led to suggestions of a potential fragmentation of public means, and all the more so since Minister Valérie Pécresse suggested promoting partnerships with private sector companies, and creating special lecturer and professor posts ("Chaires d'excellence"). Research funding which is not dependent on the ANR would also be included in each university's lump sum allocation, thereby strengthening the power of both Chancellors and the Mandarins. All this generated widespread support for anti-LRU lists at university committee elections held at the beginning of 2008. The defeat of Jean-Robert Pitte, the incumbent Sorbonne-university (Paris IV) Chancellor, thought of as a liberal-conservative, was a symbol of this dissatisfaction. A geography scholar and UMP sympathizer, he was beaten by a left-wing coalition, led by his predecessor, the Romance studies scholar Georges Molinié. In the course of 2008, anti-LRU lists became increasingly successful.

=== Autumn 2008: the reform draft laws on teacher training and the status of doctoral candidates and university lecturers ===
Within the space of a few weeks, three reforms were introduced, all of which helped to spark off a brewing crisis. None of these projects had involved negotiations or discussions with any representatives of the academic community. Education Minister Xavier Darcos, who was already caught in an impasse following the failed introduction of a reform for secondary schools (ultimately shelved), presented a plan in October that would affect the training of primary and secondary school teachers. Until that point, teachers had enjoyed the status of public servants. They first had to successfully pass a national exam with entry quotas (numerus clauses), after which they spent a year in a university teacher training institute (Institut Universitaire de Formation des Maîtres IUFM) with numerous work placements, and finally became fully qualified teachers. There were two such exams: the CAPES (following a bachelor's degree, or more often a Master's) and the Agrégation, following a master's degree and an additional preparatory year. Those who passed the Agrégation had a direct route into Higher Education teaching. Most university lecturers, especially in humanities departments, are former Agrégés who have been awarded a doctorate. Following the reform, they would have to take a master's degree in theory of education (Master Enseignement). Preparation for the exam would then become part of the second year's syllabus, during which there would also be work placements, in order for teachers to access teaching posts immediately after qualifying. However, the technical implementation of this plan has proved to be extremely complex, and opponents have stressed the fact that there would be many more candidates than work placements on offer. Moreover, the training they would receive in their original area of interest would suffer, since the hours of educational theory and exam preparation would leave less time available time for the coursework for the master's degree. Union members denounced the draft law as an attack against teachers' status as public servants and stated that Graduate students who failed the numerus clausus would then become "crowds of precariously employed teachers without any status". The academic community had already begun fighting this proposal, which they saw as threatening the status of French teachers. Meanwhile, Valérie Pécresse unveiled her own proposals.

The Minister for Higher Education's two proposals relate to the status of university lecturers and doctoral candidates. For doctoral candidates, a "general doctoral contract" ("Contrat doctoral unique") would be introduced. Without this, it would become impossible to obtain a doctorate at a French university. It would therefore become much more difficult for secondary school teachers to become university lecturers. Moreover, the draft law also included a possible obligation for doctoral candidates to perform additional duties (mostly administrative tasks), without further gain, while new contracts would facilitate the introduction of trial periods, thereby allowing university chancellors to dismiss doctoral candidates more easily.

The draft law on university lecturers amended the distinction between research and teaching hours. Until now, they had been viewed as equivalent, but following the reform it would become easier for university chancellors to allocate more teaching hours to poorly rated lecturers and less time for research. The evaluation of lecturers' performance would depend on the committee. The reform of teacher training would therefore introduce another level of exclusion for teaching and research.

Added to this was the experience of the few universities who did adopt the LRU-status on 1 January 2009, and suffered cuts in posts and funding which caused them severe problems.

== Nicolas Sarkozy's 22 January 2009 speech & the outbreak of the strike ==
=== The Speech ===
On the 22 January, Nicolas Sarkozy gave a speech in the presence of the youngest Nobel laureate, physics researcher Albert Fert. He referred to him as exceptional in France's scientific landscape, and expressed his disapproval of most researchers, who despite not inconsiderable means, failed to achieve any significant results. He also made several mocking references to researchers. This speech was seen as a provocation, and the refusal of Minister Valérie Pécresse to revise her proposals increased tensions yet further: academic unions and many associations all called for a strike and requested that their colleagues not prepare a syllabus for the master's degree in Theory of Education before a meeting was held with the Ministry on 15 March.

On 2 February, many General Assemblies were held and the decision was made to strike. On 9 February, the date of the start of the summer semester at the Sorbonne, a General Assembly was held. This was unexpectedly successful and led to the opening of three lecture halls for the debates. Ultimately, Chancellors from eight universities made numerous speeches in the famous Richelieu Amphitheatre and called for a strike until the withdrawal of all the proposed changes and the opening of joint negotiations on the future of the universities. In his address, Georges Molinié spoke of the "most dangerous threat to the French educational system since the end of the Vichy-regime".

=== Forms of action ===
Since 10 February, there has been a demonstration day every week. Although the numbers reported by police and union supporters have been very different, journalists have unanimously reported the presence of several tens of thousands of demonstrators. On 29 January and 19 March, researchers, lecturers and students played a massive part in the demonstrations held during both general strikes, that brought over 3 million people into the streets.

Lectures have been severely affected by the strike movement: some teachers hold lectures in public places as a form of demonstration, others are on total strike, while some continue to work normally, apart from those days when demonstrations are held. Here and there, there have been blockades which have occasionally lasted for several weeks. There have been several attempts to occupy premises like the Sorbonne, but these have so far failed, the demonstrators having been surrounded by the Police. Another form of action is the multiplication of festivals, conferences, alternative lessons and public events. A typical form of action was the symbolic burial of research in a symbolic place, the Ecole Normale Supérieure, for instance. This type of action is very prevalent in Parisian universities, especially Paris III and Paris IV (a Sorbonne-Festival took place at the end of March over several days).

The movement's symbol is the novel "The Princess of Cleves" by Madame de La Fayette, a French 17th century novel, considered a masterpiece of gallantry and classicism, and one that Sarkozy has often mocked, saying that this kind of book had nothing to offer a clerk for instance, and that only "sadists and idiots" would recommend this book. On 16 February, teachers and students read the book aloud in turn in front of the Panthéon. The reading lasted for 6 hours.

=== Political developments ===
After a week, several UMP members of parliament, including university chancellor Daniel Fasquelle and Pécresse's predecessor François Goulard, began criticising the ministry's position. They wanted to rewrite the draft law on lecturers' status, in order to bring the strike to an end. Pécesse started by appointing a mediator, and then gave way. But her decision came too late: only a few of the smaller unions took part in the negotiations, were unhappy with the compromise, and confirmed their protest against the other draft laws. In the meantime, the link became clear between the draft laws on the status of lecturers and doctoral candidates and the LRU law, and the strike movement, despite its only moderate power, now demanded the abrogation of the law. No part of the draft law concerning doctoral candidates has been changed to this day.

As far as Xavier Darcos is concerned, he has refused to change his plan. His brusque statements have contributed to the intensification of the opposition, and this led him to delay implementation for a year. The new exams will now only begin in July 2011. But this decision and his other resolutions on the exams or the work placements have only answered problems of a technical nature, while the opposition rejects the principle of a separation between research and the Master's training course, as well as the destruction of the IUFMs.

== Participants of the opposition movement ==
The movement has been led by an assembly of delegates from different universities, the Coordination Nationale des Universités. They constitute a front of two left-wing forces, together with groups from the centre and right-wing. This broad consensus is one strength of the movement. Its major strength is its duration. The supporters of the strike movement are:

- the left-wing public officials' union FSU (Fédération Syndicale Unitaire) and its branches SNESUP (lecturers), SNCS (researchers), SNASUB;
- the liberal-conservative lecturers' union AutonomeSup
- Qualité de la Science Française, a non-partisan association that occasionally appears at elections, and is often described as a centre group.
- the educational branches of the major unions: CGT (Confédération Générale du Travail, left-wing, branch: FERC-CGT), CFDT (Confédération Française et Démocratique du Travail, liberal left-wing, branch : SGEN-CFDT), UNSA (Union Nationale des Syndicats Autonomes, centre), FO (Force Ouvrière, left-wing);
- Associations : Sauvons l'University (Save the Universities, centre), Sauvons la Recherche (Save Research, SLR).
- Nobel laureate Albert Fert or the French academy of Sciences are also part of the government critics.
