= Académie de la Carpette anglaise =

French organization

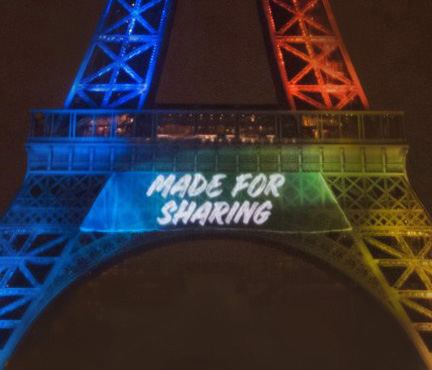
The official name of the Parisian bid for the 2024 Olympics projected onto the Eiffel Tower

The Académie de la Carpette anglaise, which may be translated as the "English Doormat Academy" (the word carpette means both "rug" and "fawner"), is a French organisation that awards an annual prize to "members of the French élite who distinguish themselves by relentlessly promoting the domination of the English language over the French language in France and in European institutions." Whether admired or despised for its tongue-in-cheek rhetoric, the Academy has captured the attention of many in the French-speaking world who genuinely fear that the growing pervasiveness of English will lead to the decline and ultimate demise of French.

The Academy was created in 1999 by a group of four French-language associations. In 2001 a second award was introduced to spotlight "key figures and constituent bodies among the European and international nomenklatura who actively conspire to promote the use of English within European and international institutions". As one member of the Academy put it, its aim is "to reward all those obscure geniuses (...) who are only too ready to say: 'Welcome to our dearly beloved invaders!' as Ceramix proudly proclaimed in the album Asterix and the Big Fight." As with the Ig Nobel Prize and the Golden Raspberry Awards, the English Doormat Award heaps ridicule on its recipients.

== Winners of the English Doormat Award ==
- 1999: Louis Schweitzer, CEO of Renault, for imposing the use of American English in its internal meeting reports. The runner-up was Claude Allègre, French minister of education, for declaring that "French people must stop considering English as a foreign language."
- 2000: Alain Richard, French Minister of Defence, for making it compulsory for French military personnel to speak English within the Eurocorps, which has no English-speaking nations among its members.
- 2001: Jean-Marie Messier, CEO of Vivendi Universal, for his unconditional promotion of English for all internal communication purposes.
- 2002: Jean-Marie Colombani, editor of Le Monde, for publishing a weekly (untranslated) selection from The New York Times, in English.
- 2003: The HEC Group, whose general manager, Bernard Ramanantsoa, declared: "To say that French is an international language of communication is laughable in this day and age."
- 2004: Claude Thélot, president of the Commission for National Debate on the Future of Schools, for declaring that English as a language of international communication should enjoy equal status with French in the school curriculum, and for recommending that undubbed American soaps should be broadcast on French television as an aid to learning English. Another nominee was Claude Simonet, president of the French Football Federation, who adopted the Jackson 5's hit "Can You Feel It" as the anthem of the French team.
- 2005: France Telecom, the telephone company run by Didier Lombard, for putting in place services and products with English descriptions (Business Talk, Live-Zoom, Family Talk...). This entry defeated, by a vote of eight to four, the entry for Yves Daudigny, president of the consul-general for the département of Aisne, for his publicity campaign "L'Aisne, it's Open".
- 2006: The Constitutional Council of France for its "numerous violations of article 2 of the Constitution which establishes French as the language of the French Republic" and for having "confirmed the London Protocol on patents as consistent with the Constitution, allowing a text in English or German to have legal effect in France."
- 2007: Christine Lagarde, Minister of Economy, for having communicated at times with her staff in English, to the point that, Le Canard enchaîné revealed, it allegedly earned her the nickname of "Christine the Guard".
- 2008: Valérie Pécresse, Minister of Higher Education and Research, for saying that the French language was in decline and that the taboo of English in EU institutions, as well as in French universities, had to be broken, to make intensive education in that language compulsory (which notably goes against the Élysée Treaty of 1963).
- 2009: Richard Descoings, director of the Institut d'Études Politiques de Paris, for imposing courses in English only in some programmes offered by the IEPP, and for communicating in English with the Lycée Français de Madrid (French lycée of Madrid).
- 2010: Martine Aubry, first Secretary of the French Socialist Party, for her use of English slogans such as "Care" and "What Would Jaurès Do?"
- 2011: Jean-François Copé, general Secretary of the French party Union for a Popular Movement, for his vigorous promotion of English in schools from kindergarten to universities and his desire to make the Anglicisation of public television a party platform in the 2011 presidential elections.
- 2012: Frédéric Cuvillier, Delegate Minister for Transport, Sea and Fishing for having declared, according to Le Parisien that in the field of transports "English should be the working and drafting language of the standardized official documents".
- 2013: Guillaume Pepy, president of SNCF, for the "Smiles, the TGV Family and other linguistic mediocrities" and the proposal of "English classes only, in his Champagne's trains".
- 2013 (exceptional award): Geneviève Fioraso, minister for Higher Education and Research, because just like Valérie Pécresse ("doormatted" in 2008) and despite several warnings, she rendered legal the article 2 of her bill for English teaching by keeping it.
- 2014: Pierre Moscovici, member of the European Commission, for having sent to Michel Sapin, minister for Finances and Public Accounts, a letter entirely in English.
- 2015: Alexandre de Juniac, CEO of Air-France-KLM, for the advertisement campaign "Air France, France is in the air", replacing the elegant commercial « Faire du ciel le plus bel endroit de la terre » (Making the sky the prettiest place on Earth).
- 2016: Anne-Florence Schmitt, director of the editorial board of Madame Figaro, for the constant abuse of anglicisms and bogus English, in that magazine targeted for a large feminine public.
- 2017: Anne Hidalgo, mayor of Paris, for using English as the main language of communication of the City of Paris.
- 2018: Olivier Schrameck, President of the Conseil supérieur de l'audiovisuel, for refusing to enforce the rules on the use of the French language in radio and television.
- 2019: La Banque postale, for its mobile banking product entitled "Ma French Bank" and the related advertising.
- 2021: Gérald Darmanin, Minister of the Interior, for promoting the new bilingual identity card.
- 2022: Emmanuel Macron, President, for his numerous violations of the Constitution, Article 2 of which provides that “French is the language of the Republic of France”.
- 2023: Agence française de développement, through its chief executive Rémy Rioux, for giving English titles to its events pertaining to French-speaking Africa.
- 2024: Tie between Astrid Woitellier, for removing French language testing from the Puissance Alpha admissions exam but keeping the English language test; and the Bishops' Conference of France, for naming their 2024 Olympic Games associated event "Holy Games."
- 2025: Stéphane Pallez, president of FDJ United for renaming the company from "Française des jeux" to "FDJ United" to symbolize the company's "opening to the international".

== Winners of the special Jury Award ==
- 2001: Lego, the Danish toy company, for showcasing its products in English, in France and all over the world, with slogans such as "Explore being me", "Explore together", "Explore logic" and "Explore imagination."
- 2002: Romano Prodi, president of the European Commission, for defying community rules by never missing an opportunity to promote English as the one and only language for labelling food products and negotiating with other European countries.
- 2003: Pascal Lamy, for his systematic use of English in defiance of community rules, while acting as European commissioner.
- 2004: Jean-Claude Trichet, president of the European Central Bank, for presenting the ECB's policy statements in English at the European Parliament and for declaring "I am not a Frenchman" (in English) when taking office.
- 2005: Josep Borrell, president of the European Parliament, for favouring English at a session of the Euro-Mediterranean parliamentary assembly after having just presided at Rabat in Morocco without having translated the working papers.
- 2006: Ernest-Antoine Seillière, president of the Union of Industrial and Employers' Confederations of Europe, for having delivered a speech to the European Council in Brussels in English in March 2006.
- 2007: The police of Geneva, for an advertisement United Police of Geneva (title in English).
- 2008: Eurostat, the Statistical Service of the European Commission, for giving up German and French to broadcast since April 2008 its publication Statistiques en bref in English only.
- 2009: Jean-Louis Borloo, Minister of State, Minister of Ecology, Energy, Sustainable Development and Sea, for invoking emergency in order to sign the Treaty for International Renewable Energy Agency whose sole working language is English, while five important countries are still withholding signatures.
- 2010: Paul Kagamé, President of Rwanda, for replacing French with English as an official language and as the language of education, and for withdrawing Rwanda from the Organisation internationale de la Francophonie to join the Commonwealth.^{1}
- 2011: Ryanair, for demanding in Spain of women pregnant beyond 28 weeks a medical certificate in English, even for domestic flights.
- 2012: Invest in France Agency and National Institute of Industrial Property, for their campaign "Say oui to France – Say oui to innovation."
- 2013: Tom Enders, then-chief executive of Airbus, for announcing layoffs to his German, Spanish, and French employees in an English-language video.
- 2014: Paula Ovaska-Romano, director of the Department for Languages of the European Commission, for having told a man speaking to her in Italian that it was an "exotic language" in English.
- 2015: Luc Besson, for helping create tax legislation to get financial aid meant for French films to include English-language films shot in France.
- 2016: École normale supérieure, for claiming to be an international school while developing coursework solely in English.
- 2017: Donald Tusk, president of the European Council, for prioritizing speaking English and refusing to speak French.
- 2018: Doug Ford, Premier of Ontario, for cutting funding from the French University of Ontario in Toronto, despite both French and English being recognized state languages.
- 2019: Ursula von der Leyen for having proposed a requirement that European Commission laws be written in English, notably going into effect the day that the United Kingdom left the EU.
- 2021: Ursula von der Leyen, a second prize, for the same proposal.
- 2022: Justin Trudeau for having nominated a monolingual English speaker as the Governor General of Canada.
- 2023: Sven Gatz, Belgian Minister of Finance, for having proposed adding English as the third administrative language of Brussels.
- 2024: France Football, for running their "Ballon d'or" award ceremony in Paris, done entirely in English.
- 2025: The Cantonal Council of Zurich for ending their French language elementary education program, instead starting it in the first year of middle school (6 years after English language education).

^{1}Albeit exaggeratedly, as Rwanda never dropped French as an official language and also never left La Francophonie.

== See also ==
- Sprachpanscher des Jahres
