= Wet Gunpowder Award =

- Venue: Khorramshahr
- Country: Iran
- Presented by: Basij
- First award: 2013
- Final award: 2018

Highlights
- Most wins: Donald Trump (2)
- Most nominations: Benjamin Netanyahu (3)
- Website: barotekhis.ir

The Wet Gunpowder Award (Persian: جایزه باروت خیس) is an Iranian symbolic award that according to organizers, is given to "ridiculous people whose chaffy character is evident to everyone and when this nature of theirs is accompanied with self-belief turns into an indefinite foolishness for them".

The organizers, who have close ties to Basij and Islamic Revolutionary Guards Corps (The award is unveiled by Basij commander Mohammad Reza Naqdi), claim award winner is "someone who is against the Islamic Revolution" and who “against their own wishes, performs a service to the revolution.”

The statue of the award is that of brain with dark glasses and hearing aids with a plaque of the Quranic verse: "Unwilling to hear, unwilling to speak, unwilling to see, then, they will not return to the way."

In 2015, they awarded a parody of Golden Bear.

== Recipients ==
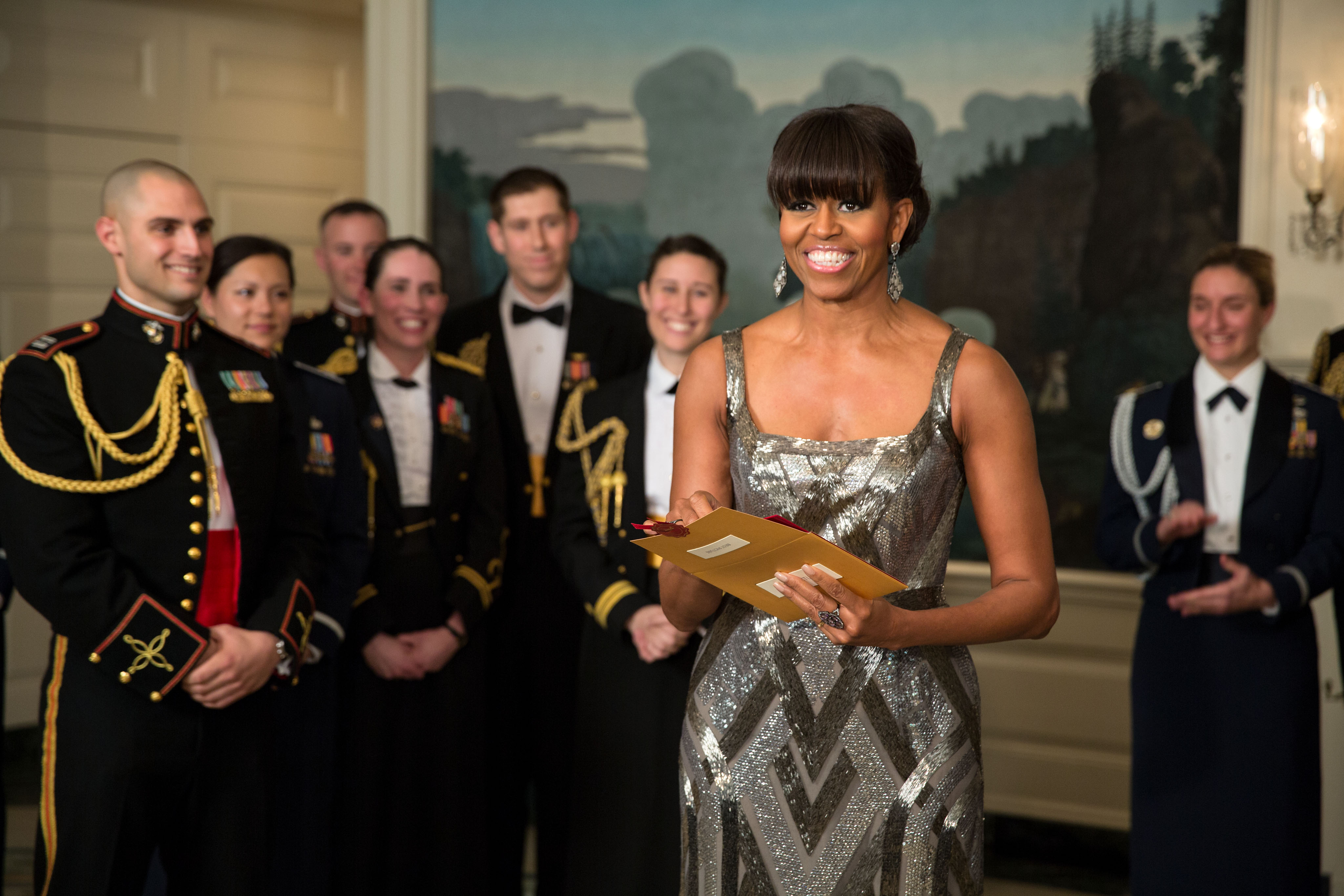
First Lady Michelle Obama, pictured here announcing the winner of 2013 Academy Award for Best Picture, Argo, was inaugural winner. The prize was posted to her via Swiss Embassy in Tehran.

Year	Name	Nat	Org	Office holding	Rationale
2013	Michelle Obama	(United States)		First Lady of the United States	For "showing the truth about the Oscar awards to the world."
2014	Catherine Ashton	(United Kingdom)	(European Union)	High Representative of the Union for Foreign Affairs and Security Policy	For meeting Sattar Beheshti's mother and handing Sakharov Prize to Nasrin Sotoudeh and Jafar Panahi
2014	Tarja Cronberg	(Finland)	(European Union)	Member of the European Parliament	For meeting Sattar Beheshti's mother and handing Sakharov Prize to Nasrin Sotoudeh and Jafar Panahi
2014	Benjamin Netanyahu	(Israel)		Prime Minister of Israel	
2014	Shimon Peres	(Israel)		President of Israel	
2014	Ban Ki-moon	(South Korea)	(United Nations)	Secretary-General of the United Nations	
2014	John Kerry	(United States)		United States Secretary of State	
2014	Barack Obama	(United States)		United States President	
2015	Manuel Valls	(France)		Prime Minister of France	"For disrespecting religious beliefs despite claiming for Free thought in France"
2015	David Cameron	(United Kingdom)		Prime Minister of the United Kingdom	"For disrespecting Iranian President Hassan Rouhani"
2015	Benjamin Netanyahu	(Israel)		Prime Minister of Israel	"For killing 578 children in 51 days despite maintaining peaceful face publicly"
2015	Claudia Roth	(Germany)		Vice-President of the Bundestag	"For publicly showing her ties to Fitna (2009 presidential election protests)"
2015	John McCain	(United States)		United States Senator	"For above board support of Islamic State of Iraq and Levant and opposition to terrorism at the same time"
2016
2016	Cheryl Boone Isaacs	(United States)		President of the Academy of Motion Picture Arts and Sciences	"For deliberately removing Muhammad: The Messenger of God from Foreign Language Film nominates in 88th Academy Awards and showing the anti-Islamic nature of Academy Awards"
2016	Juergen Boos	(Germany)		Director of the Frankfurt Book Fair	"For inviting Salman Rushdie and demonstrating the Zionist and anti-Islamic nature of this festival"
2016	François Hollande	(France)		President of France	"For awarding Legion of Honour to Derayeh Derakhshesh, cultural opposition of Iran"
2016	Piers Handling	(Canada)		Director of the Toronto International Film Festival	"For screening Septembers of Shiraz and demonstrating the anti-Iranian nature of this festival"
2017
2017	Donald Trump	(United States)		President of the United States	"For making America's numerous economic and political crises public, announcing a complaint against the Barack Obama administration for wiretapping conversations and scandals about the poverty and problems of the American people, and also showing the true face of global arrogance."
2017	Adel al-Jubeir	(Saudi Arabia)		Ministry of Foreign Affairs (Saudi Arabia)	"In a statement, he called Iran the biggest sponsor of terrorism, while Saudi Arabia is considered the biggest sponsor of Takfiri and terrorist groups in the world, and they have caused insecurity in the region and the world."
2017	Hillary Clinton	(United States)		2016 United States presidential election candidate	"For Making public the US policy of creating and supporting terrorist and Takfiri groups such as ISIS"
2018
2018	Donald Trump	(United States)		President of the United States	"For recognizing Quds (Jerusalem) as the capital of Israel and continuing to support Zionist crimes, constantly threatening independent countries and trying to create war and chaos in every corner of the world, supporting the crimes of the Saudis in Yemen and participating in the killing of innocent Yemeni people."
2018	Benjamin Netanyahu	(Israel)		Prime Minister of Israel	"For constant military threats against Islamic countries, reaching a record of killing 578 children in 51 days, continuing occupation of the Palestinian state, and daily oppression against Muslims and Christians."
2018	Nikki Haley	(United States)		United States Ambassador to the United Nations	"For supporting the killing of the oppressed people of Yemen by the Saudis and stubbornly supporting Israel's crimes"

=== Special awards ===
Year	Name	Nat	Office holding	Award	Rationale
2015	Dieter Kosslick	(Germany)	Director of the Berlin International Film Festival	"Goldean Bear"	For "devaluation of Arts" with awarding an "anti-Iranian movie" [Taxi by Jafar Panahi]
