= Jardin des Plantes =

Botanical garden in Paris, France

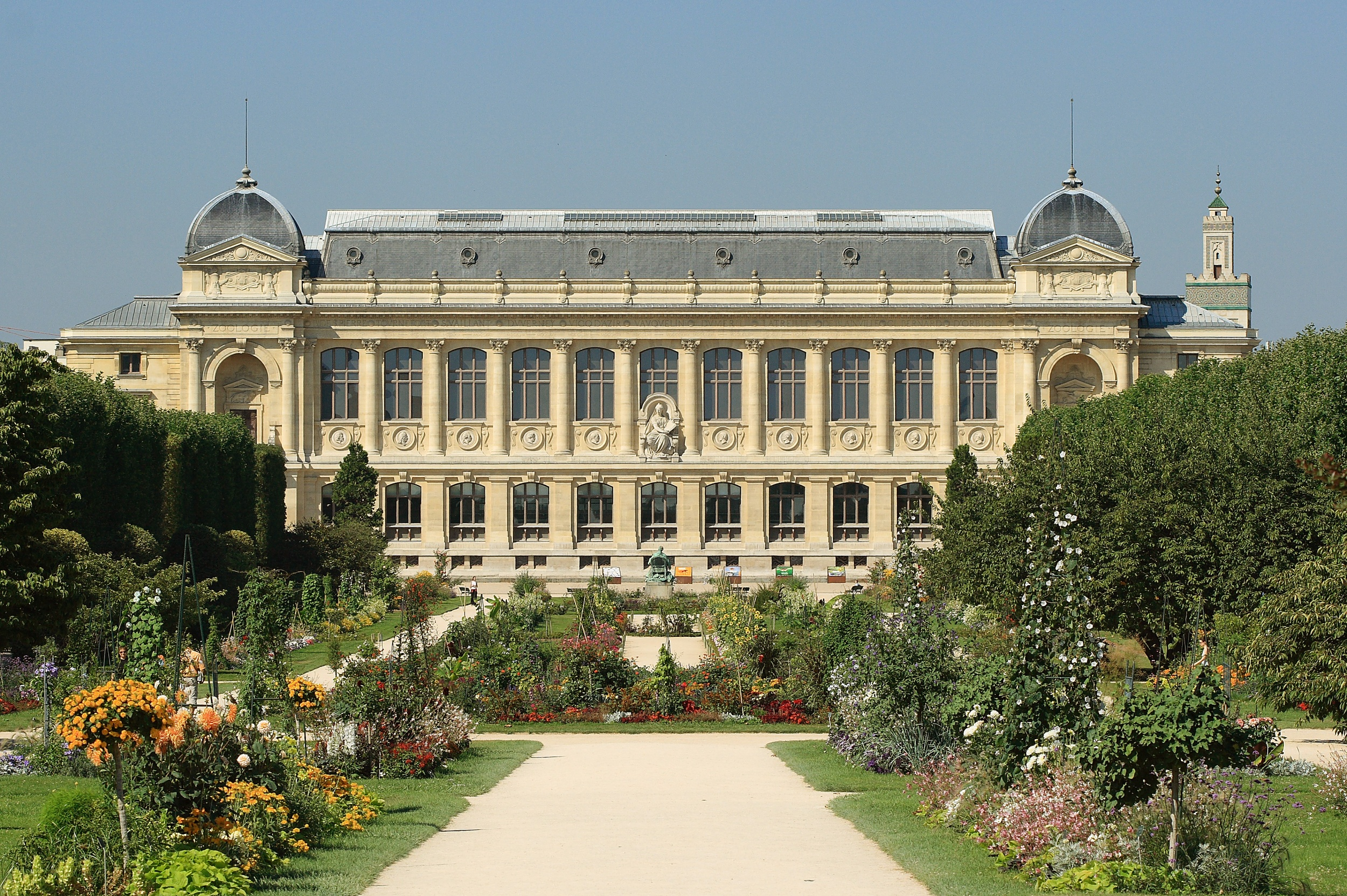
- The exterior of the Grande Galerie de l'Évolution ('Gallery of Evolution'). Drawing plans by architect Louis-Jules André, 1889, when it still was named Galerie de Zoologie ('Gallery of Zoology').

- Location within Paris
- Established: 1635
- Location: Paris, France
- Coordinates: 48.84396°N 2.35960°E
- Type: botanical garden
- Visitors: 1,586,450
- Public transit access: Jussieu; Austerlitz

Muséum national d'histoire naturelle network
- Muséum national d'histoire naturelle; Jardin des Plantes; Musée de l'Homme; Ménagerie du Jardin des Plantes; Brunoy Ecology Research Centre; Chèvreloup Arboretum; Jardin botanique exotique de Menton; Marinarium Concarneau Marine Biology Station; Paris Zoological Park (Vincennes Zoo); Cleres Zoological Park; Research and Education Centre on Coastal Systems; Haute Touche Zoological Park; Jaysinia Alpine Garden; Abri Pataud Prehistoric Museum; L’Harmas de Fabre

The Jardin des Plantes (French pronunciation: [ʒaʁdɛ̃ de plɑ̃t], lit. 'Garden of the Plants'), known as the Jardin des Plantes de Paris (French: [- də paʁi]) when distinguished from those in other cities, and formerly as the Jardin du Roi, is the main botanical garden in France. Jardin des Plantes is the official name, shortened from Jardin Royal des Plantes Médicinales, as the original purpose of the garden in the 17th century was to grow medicinal plants.

Headquarters of the Muséum National d'Histoire Naturelle (National Museum of Natural History, part of Sorbonne University), the Jardin des Plantes covers 28 hectares of the 5th arrondissement of Paris, on the left bank of the river Seine. The entire garden and its contained buildings, archives, libraries, greenhouses, ménagerie (a zoo), works of art, and specimens' collection are a national historical landmark (monument historique).

== Garden plan ==
The grounds of the Jardin des Plantes include four buildings containing exhibited specimens. These buildings are officially museums (musée de France) but the French Museum of Natural History calls them galeries:

- The Grande Galerie de l'Évolution ('Gallery of Evolution') was inaugurated in 1889 as the Galerie de Zoologie ('Gallery of Zoology'). In 1994, the gallery was renamed Grande Galerie de l'Évolution, and its exhibited specimens were completely reorganised so that the visitor is oriented by the common thread of evolution as the major subject treated by the gallery.
- The Galerie de Minéralogie et de Géologie ('Gallery of Mineralogy and Geology'), a mineralogy museum, built as of 1833, inaugurated in 1837.
- The Galerie de Paléontologie et d'Anatomie Comparée ('Gallery of Paleontology and Comparative Anatomy'), a comparative anatomy museum in the ground floor and a paleontology museum in the first and second floors. The building was inaugurated in 1898.
- The Galerie de Botanique ('Gallery of Botany'), inaugurated in 1935 thanks to funds provided by the Rockefeller Foundation, contains botany laboratories and the French Muséum's National Herbarium (the biggest in the world with a collection of almost 8 million samples of plants). The building also contains a small permanent exhibition about botany.

Jardin des plantes de Paris

The botanical garden grows more than 10,000 species. It includes tropical greenhouses, a rose garden, a winter garden, as well as an Alpine garden. In addition to the gardens and the galleries, there is also a small zoo, the Ménagerie du Jardin des Plantes, founded in 1795 by Bernardin de Saint-Pierre from animals of the Ménagerie Royale de Versailles, the menagerie at Versailles, which was dismantled during the French Revolution.

== History ==
=== The Royal Garden of Medicinal Plants ===
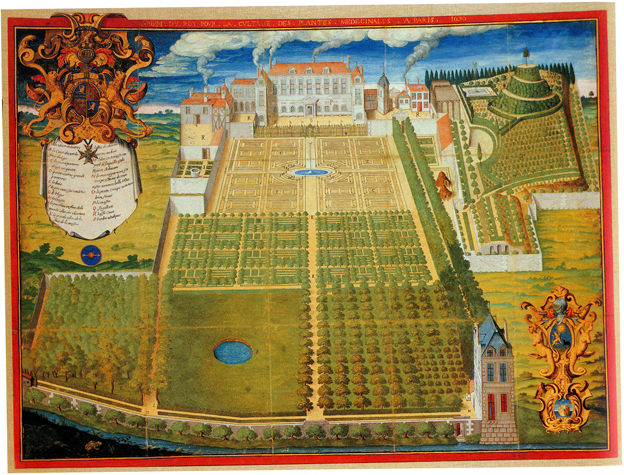
The garden in 1636

The garden was formally founded in 1635 as the Royal Garden of Medicinal Plants by an edict of King Louis XIII. The garden was put under the authority of the Physician of the king, Guy de la Brosse. It was staffed by a group of "demonstrateurs", who lectured visitors, particularly future physicians and pharmacists, on botany, chemistry, and geology, illustrated by the garden collections.

In 1673, under Louis XIV, and his new royal physician and director of the Garden, Guy-Crescent Fagon, great-nephew of Guy de la Brosse, the garden was given a new amphitheater, where dissections and other medical courses were conducted. The lecturers included the celebrated physician and anatomist Claude Perrault, equally famous as the architect who designed the facade of the Louvre Palace.

In the early 18th century, the chateau was given an additional floor to house the royal botanist's medicinal plant collection. This section was gradually turned into galleries to display the royal collection of minerals. At the same time, the greenhouses on the west and south were enlarged, to hold the plants brought back to France by numerous scientific expeditions around the world. New plants were studied, dried, and cataloged. A group of artists made herbals, books with detailed illustrations of each new plant, and the plants of the collection were carefully studied for their possible medical or culinary uses. One example was the group of coffee plants brought from Java to Paris, which were raised and studied by Antoine de Jussieu for their possible medical and commercial use. His studies led to the plantation of coffee in the French colonies of North America.

=== The Buffon period (1739–1788) ===
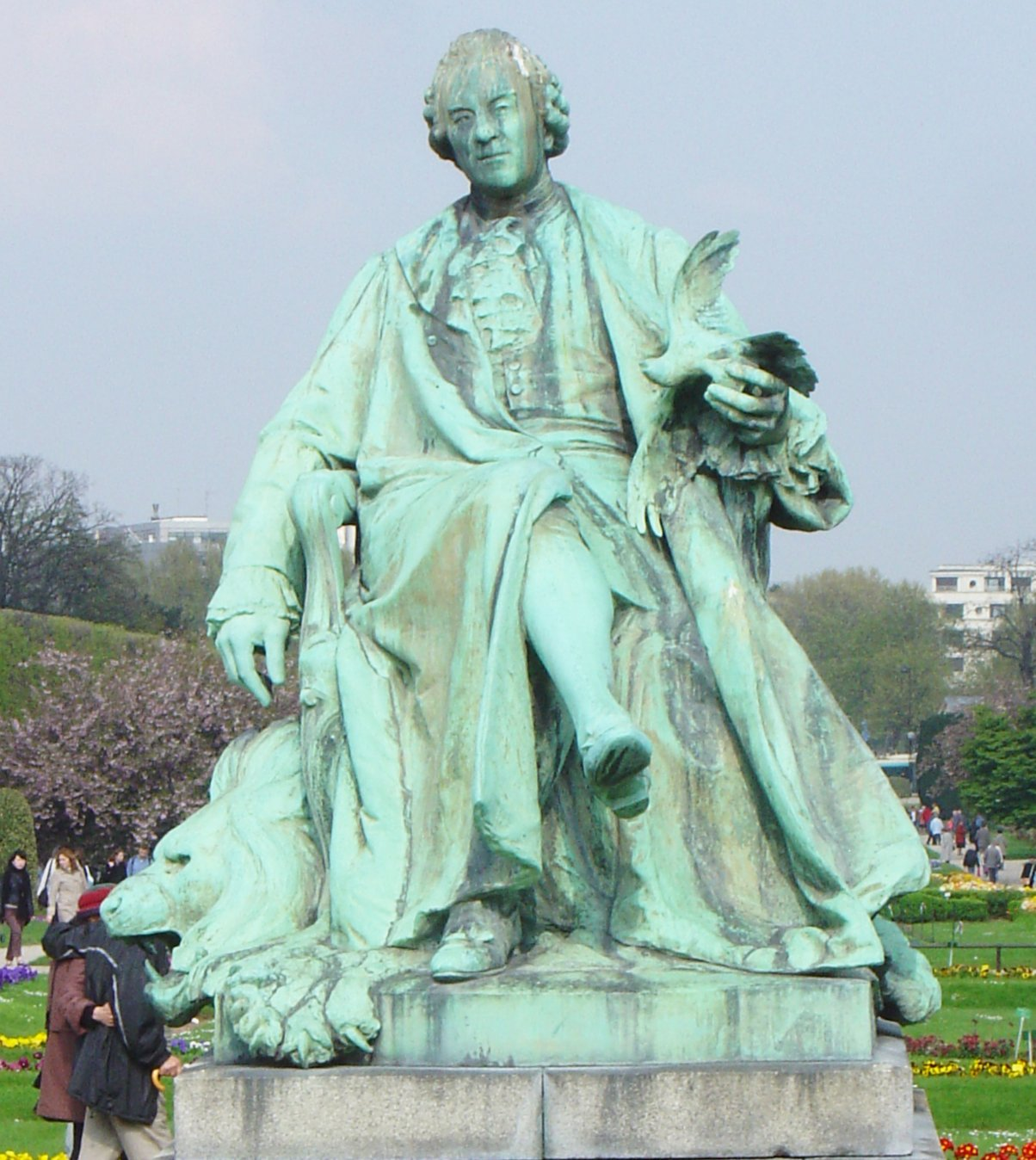
Statue of Georges-Louis Leclerc, Comte de Buffon in the formal garden

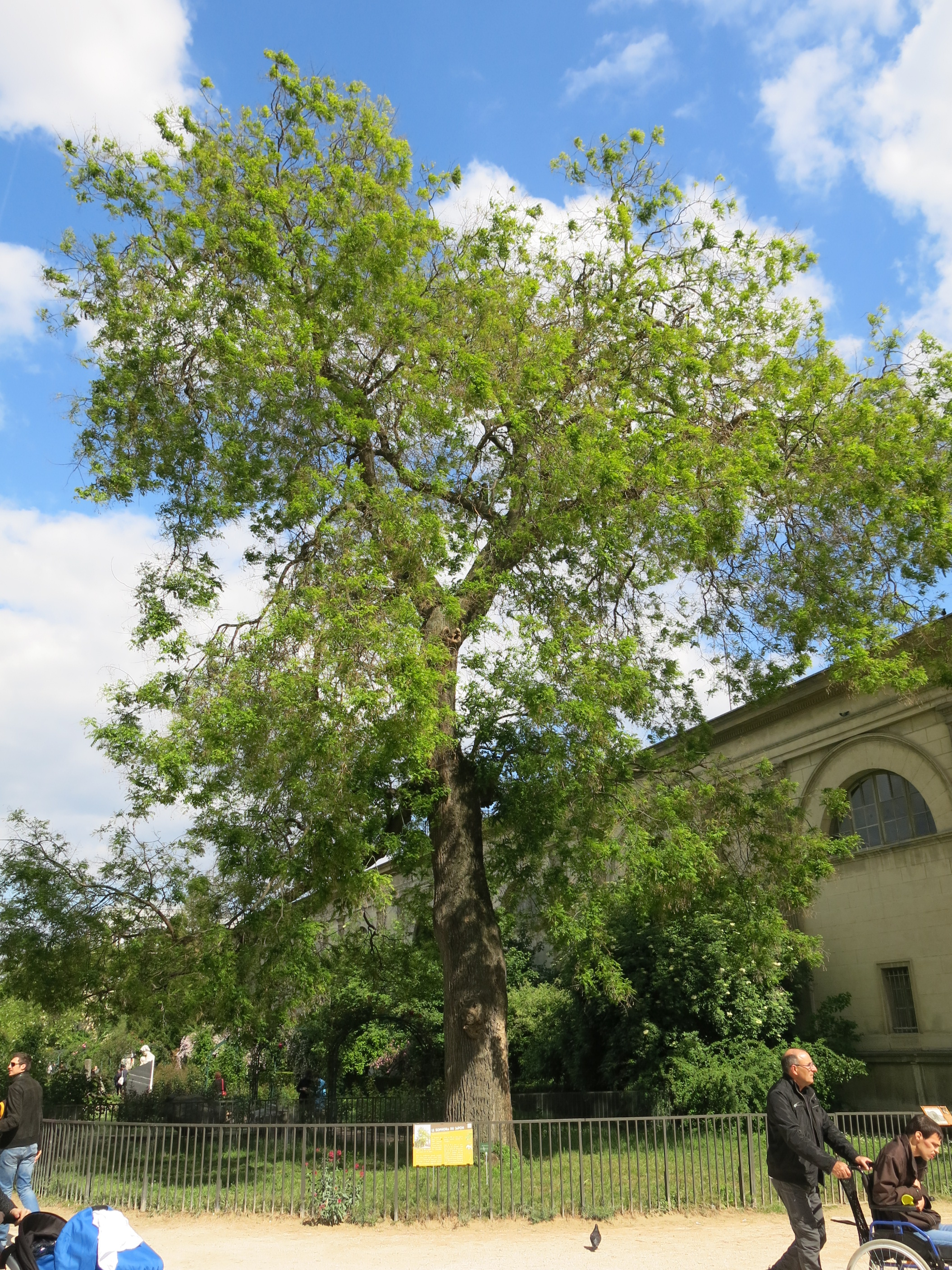
The Sophora Jussieu, planted by Buffon in the garden in 1747

The most celebrated head of the garden was Georges-Louis Leclerc, Comte de Buffon, who served as its head from 1739 until his death in 1788. While director of the garden, he also owned and operated a large and successful iron works and foundry in Burgundy, but lived in the garden, in the house that now carries his name. Buffon doubled the size of the garden, expanding down to the banks of Seine. He enlarged the Cabinet of Natural History in the main building, and added a new gallery to the south. He also brought into the scientific community of the garden a team of important botanists and naturalists, including Jean Baptiste Lamarck, author of one of the earliest theories of evolution.

Sponsored by Buffon, explorers and botanists were sent to different corners of the world to collect specimens for the garden and museum. Michel Adanson was sent to Senegal, and the navigator La Perouse to the islands of the Pacific. They returned with shiploads of specimens, which were carefully studied and classified. This research caused a conflict between the scientists of the Royal Gardens and the professors of the Sorbonne over the question of evolution. The scientists, led by Buffon and his followers, claimed that natural species gradually evolved, while the theologians of the Sorbonne insisted that nature was exactly as it was at the time of the Creation. Since the scientists had the backing of the Royal court, they were able to continue their studies and publish their work.

=== The French Revolution and the 19th Century – The Menagerie ===
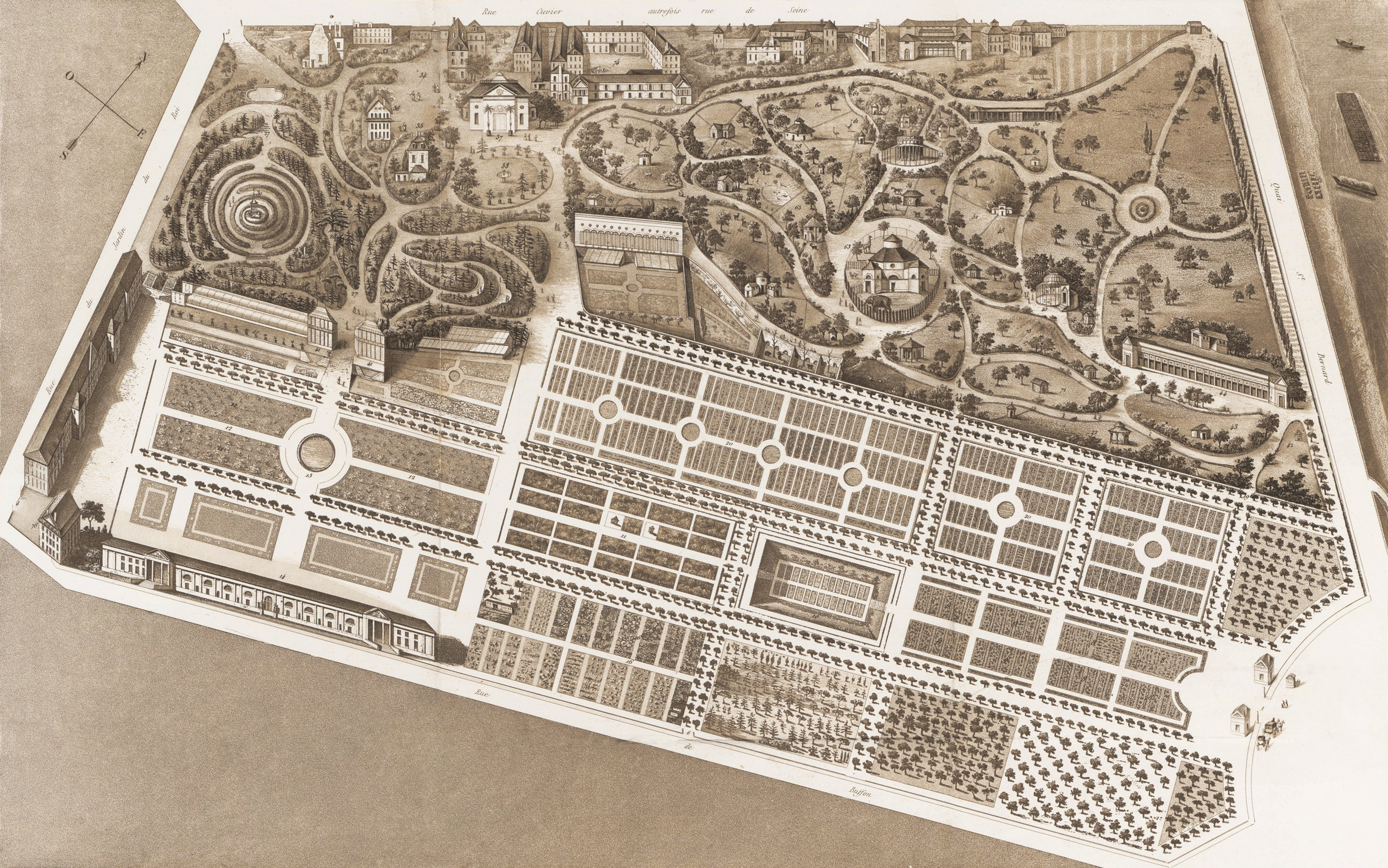
The Jardin des Plantes and Menagerie in 1842

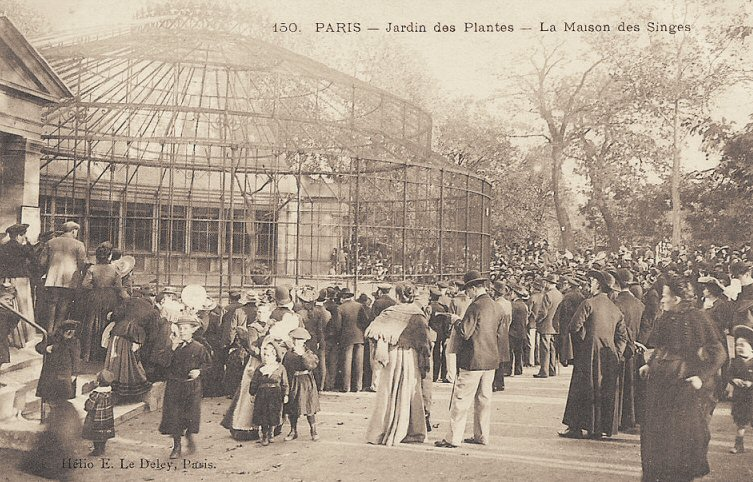
Crowd outside the Palace of the Apes (c. 1900)

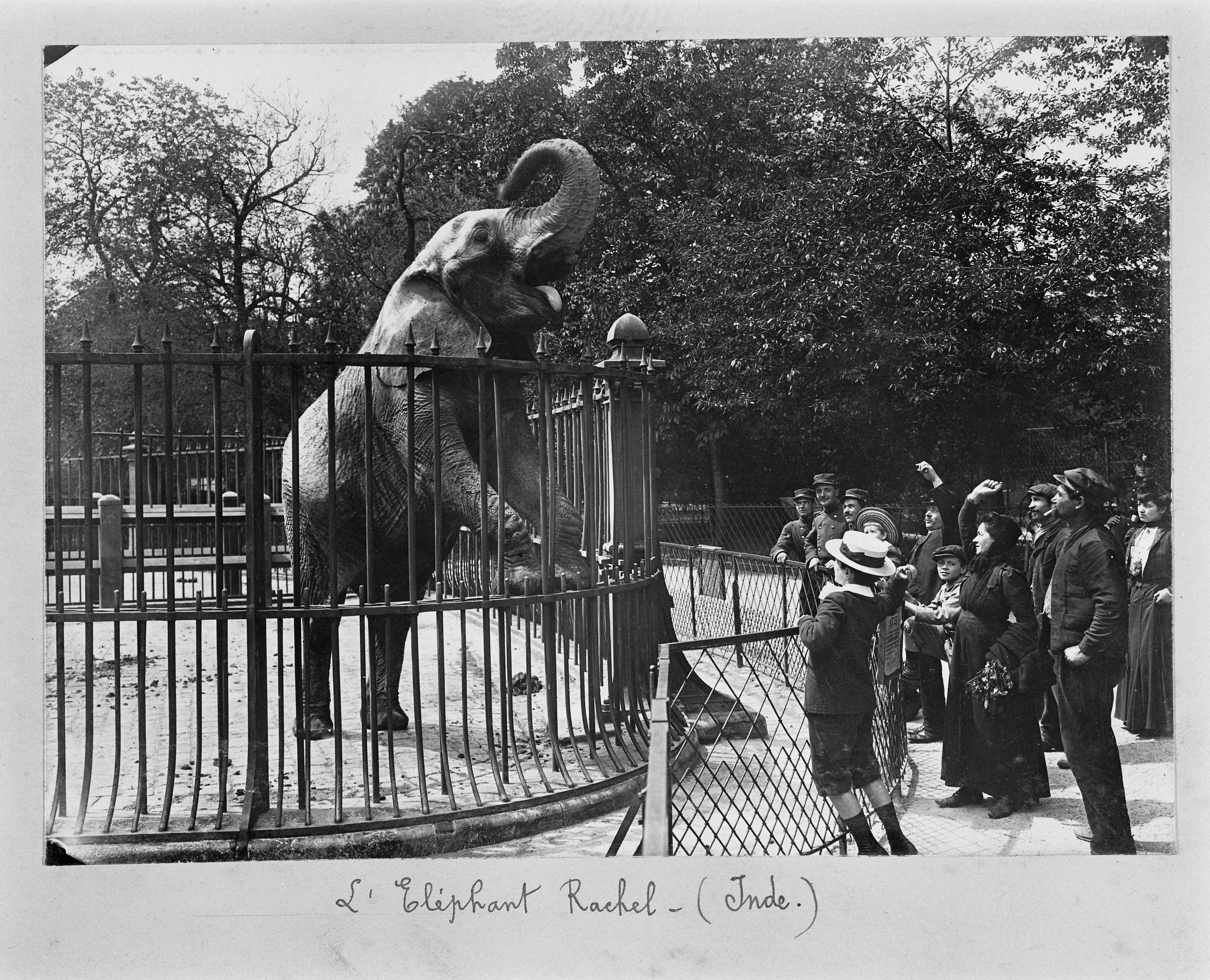
Rachel the elephant (c. 1905)

On June 7, 1793, in the course of the French Revolution, the new government, the National Convention, ordered a complete transformation of the former royal institutions. They created a new Museum of Arts and Techniques, transformed the Louvre from a royal residence to a museum of art, and combined the Royal Garden of Plants and the Cabinet of Natural Sciences into a single organization: the Museum of Natural History. It also received a number of important collections which had belonged to aristocrats, such as a famous group of wax models illustrating anatomy which had been created by André Pinson.

The Museum and gardens also benefited from Napoleon's 1798 French invasion of Egypt and Syria; the military force was accompanied by one hundred and fifty-four botanists, astronomers, archeologists, chemists, artists and other scholars, including Gaspard Monge, Joseph Fourier, and Claude Louis Berthollet. Drawings and paintings of their findings are in the collections of the Natural History Museum.

The holdings today include 6,963 specimens of the herbarium collection of Joseph Tournefort, donated on his death.

The major addition to the garden in the late 18th century was the Ménagerie du Jardin des Plantes. It was proposed in 1792 by Bernardin de Saint-Pierre, the intendant of the gardens, in large part to rescue the animals of the royal menagerie at the Palace of Versailles, who had been largely abandoned during the Revolution. The Duke of Orleans had a similar private zoo, also abandoned. At the same time the government of the Convention ordered the seizure of all the animals put on public display by various circuses in Paris. In 1795, the government acquired the Hôtel de Magné, the large estate of a French nobleman next to the gardens, and installed the large cages that had housed the animals at Versailles. The menagerie went through a very difficult early period, when the majority of the animals died, before it was given sufficient funding and more suitable structures by Napoleon. It became the home of animals brought back to France in scientific expeditions in the early 19th century, including a famous giraffe given to King Charles X by the Sultan of Cairo in 1827.

On 25 August 1944, Allied American troops (2nd DB) were stationed here for the night after the Liberation of Paris from Nazi Germany.

=== Late 19th–20th century – additions and experiments ===
Throughout the 19th and early 20th century, the primary mission of the gardens and museums was research. Working in the laboratories there, the chemist Eugene Chevreul first isolated fatty acids and cholesterol, and studied the chemistry of vegetal dyes. The physiologist Claude Bernard studied the functions of the glycogen in the liver. In 1896, the physicist Henri Becquerel, working in a laboratory in the museum, discovered radioactivity. He wrapped uranium salts together with an unexposed photographic plate wrapped in black cloth, to keep out the sunlight. When he unwrapped them, the photographic plate had changed color from exposure to the radiation. He received the Nobel Prize in 1903 for his discovery.

The Gallery of Paleontology and of Comparative Anatomy was opened in 1898, replacing structures built between 1795 and 1807, to contain and display the thousands of skeletons the museum had collected. The menagerie buildings were also expanded, with the construction of an immense Bird House, by architect Jules André, 12 meters (39 ft) high, 37 meters (121 ft) long and 25 meters (82 ft) long,

The appearance of the gardens changed in the late 19th and early 20th century with the construction of new buildings. In 1877, the gallery of zoology, the landmark building that overlooks the formal garden, designed by Jules André, was begun. It was built to contain the immense zoological collections of the museum; the central hall is a landmark of iron construction, comparable to the Grand Palais and the Musée d'Orsay. It was inaugurated in 1888, but thereafter suffered from a long lack of maintenance and was closed in 1965. In the 1980s, a new home was found for the museum's gigantic collections. The Zoothêque, was constructed between 1980 and 1986 underneath the Esplanade Milne-Edwards, directly in front of the Gallery of Zoology. It is accessible only to researchers, and contains the thirty million specimens of insects, five hundred thousand fish and reptiles, one hundred fifty thousand birds, and seven thousand other animals. The building above underwent a major renovation from 1991 to 1994, to house the updated Grand Gallery of Evolution.

== National Museum of Natural History ==
The National Museum of Natural History has been called "the Louvre of the Natural Sciences". It is contained in five buildings laid out along the formal garden; the Gallery of Evolution; the Gallery of Mineralogy and Geology; the Gallery of Botany; the Gallery of Paleontology and Comparative Anatomy; and the Laboratory of Entomology.

=== The Grand Gallery of Evolution ===
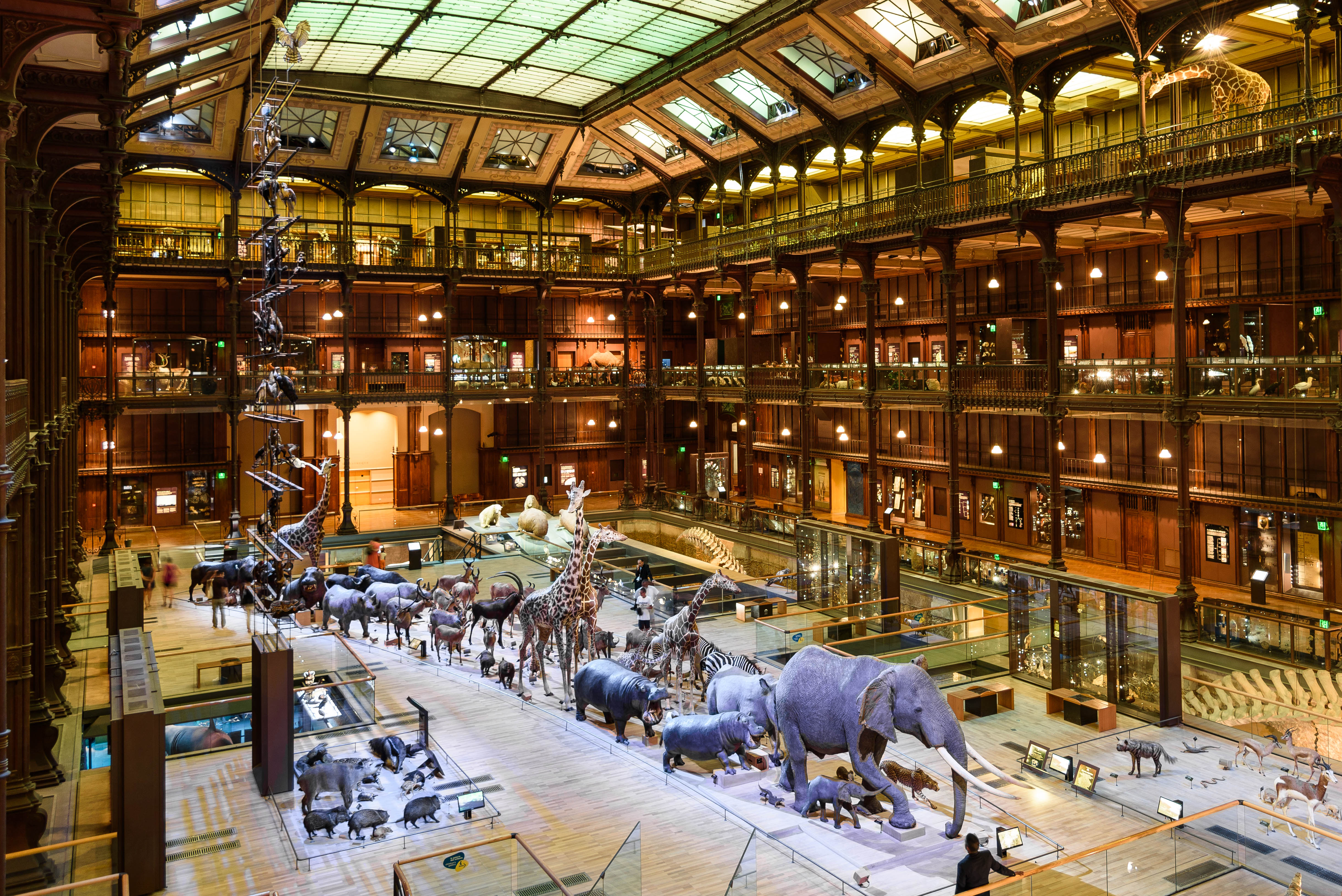
Courtyard of the Grand Gallery of Evolution

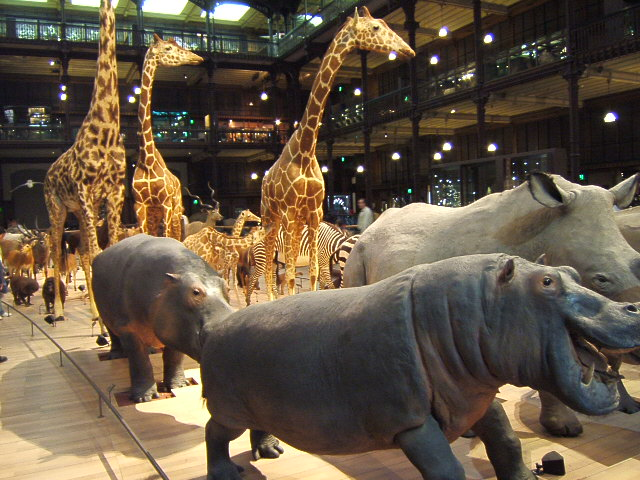
Parade of species in the Grand Gallery of Evolution

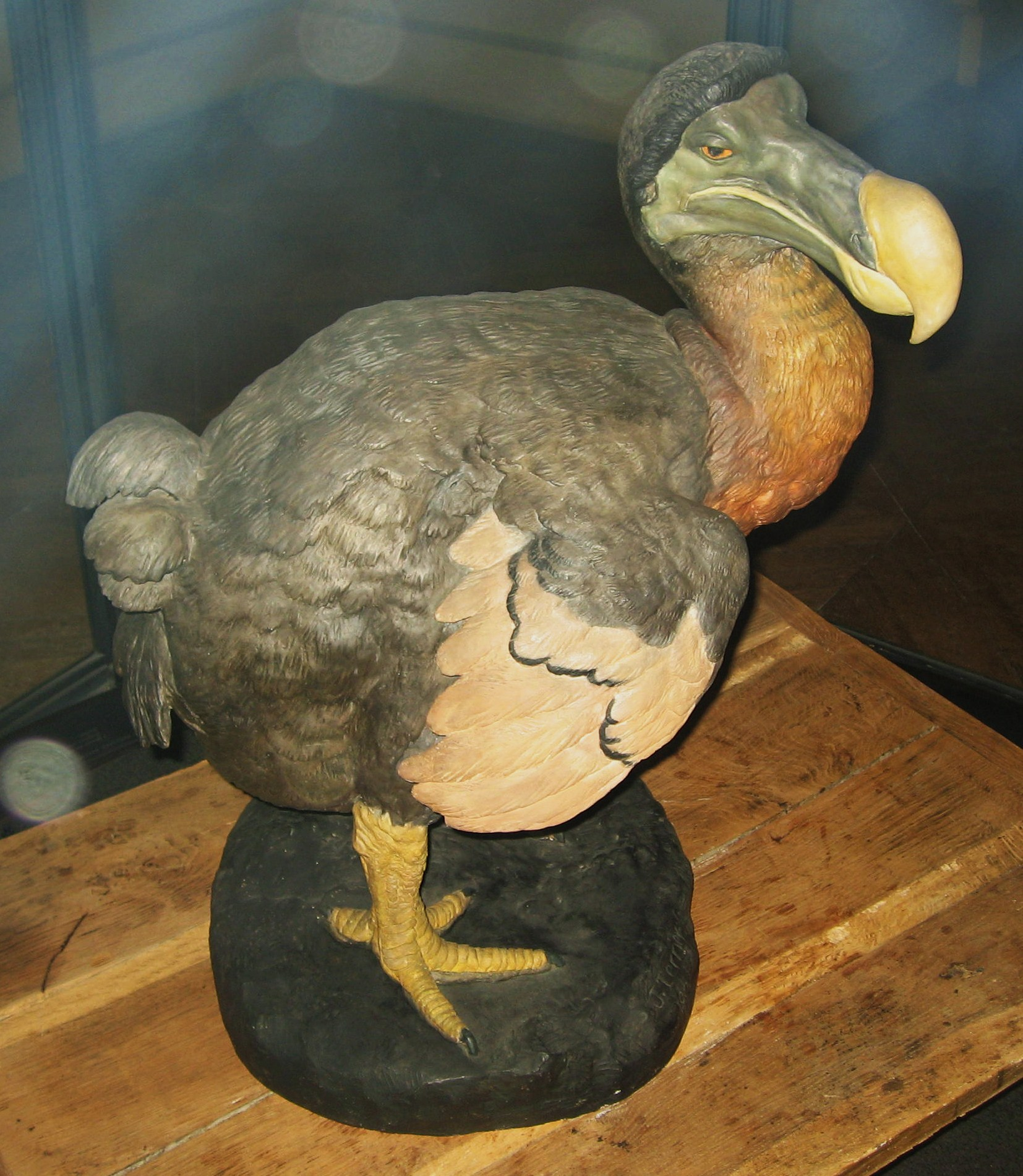
Reconstitution of a dodo in the section on endangered and disappeared species

The Grand Gallery of Evolution was designed by Jules André, whose other works in Paris included, in collaboration with Henri Labrouste, the Beaux-arts Bibliotheque National. He became architect of the museum in 1867, and his works are found throughout the Jardin des Plantes. It opened during the Paris Universal Exposition of 1889, though it was not finished as intended; it still lacks a grand facade on the side of rue Geoffroy-Saint-Hilaire. The main facade, facing the two principal alleys of the formal garden, is flanked by two lantern towers. A series of medallions between the bays on the main facade overlooking the garden honors ten of the notable scientists who have worked in the Museum along with an allegorical statue of a woman holding an open book of knowledge.

While the exterior is Beaux-Arts architecture, the interior iron structure was entirely modern, contemporary with the Grand Palais and the new railroad station of the gare d'Orsay (now the Musée d'Orsay). It encloses a rectangular hall 55 meters long, 25 meters wide and 15 meters high, with the glass roof of one thousand square meters supported by rows of slender iron columns. The structure deteriorated, had to be closed in 1965, then underwent extensive restoration between 1991 and 1995. It now presents, through preserved animals and media displays, the evolution of species. It gives special attention to species that have disappeared or are endangered. The collection of preserved animals includes the rhinoceros brought to France in the 18th century by Louis XV.

=== Gallery of Mineralogy and Geology ===
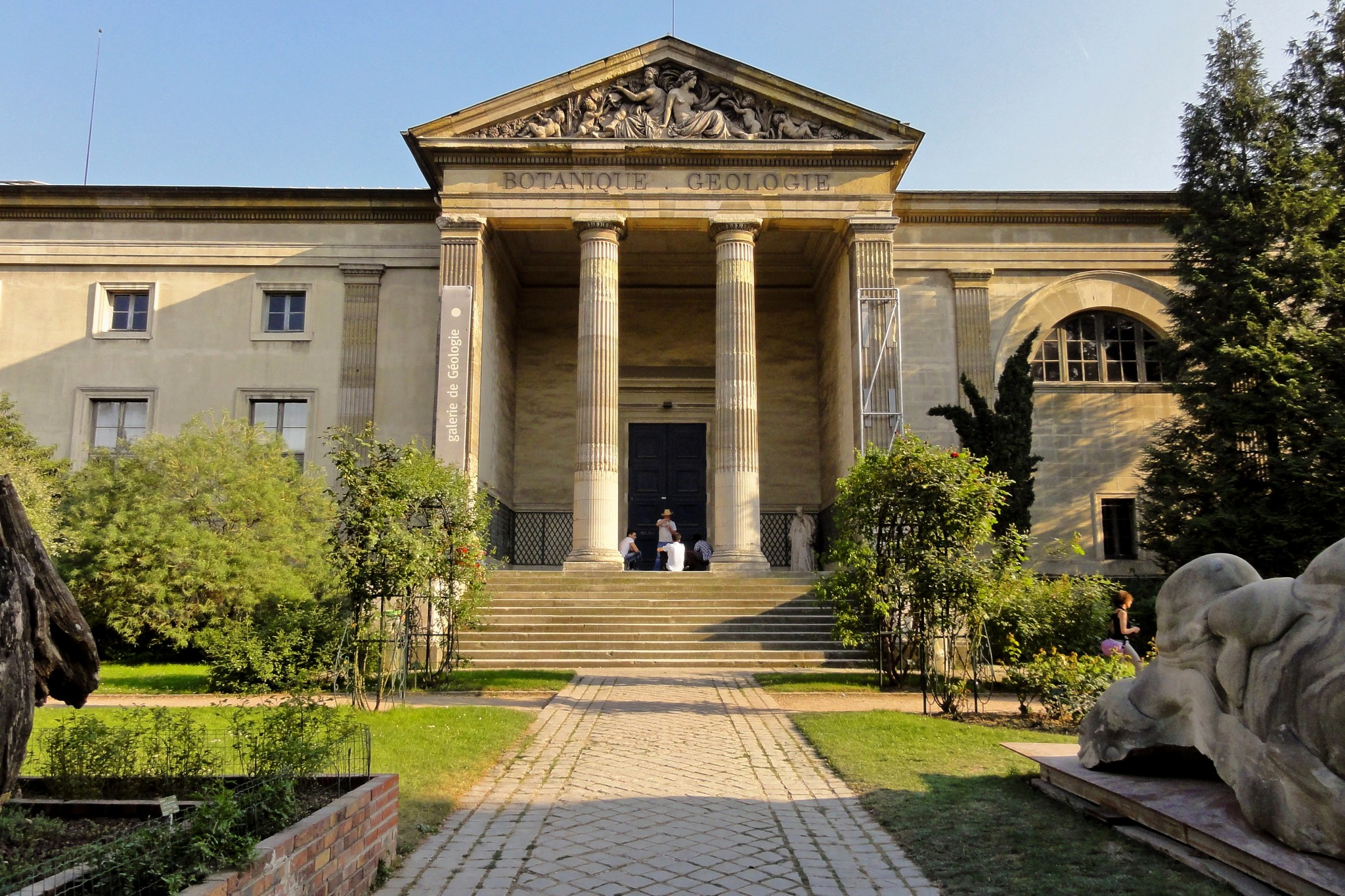
Gallery of Mineralogy and Geology

In front of the Gallery of Mineralogy and Geology stands one of the trees of the royal garden, a Sophora Japonica tree planted by Bernard de Jussieu in 1747. The gallery was constructed between 1833 and 1837 by Charles Rohault de Fleury in neoclassical style, with triangular frontons and pillars. The collection inside includes some six hundred thousand stones, gems, and fossils. Among the notable exhibits is the petrified trunk of a bald cypress tree from the Tertiary geological era, discovered in the Essonne region of France in 1986.

=== Gallery of Botany ===
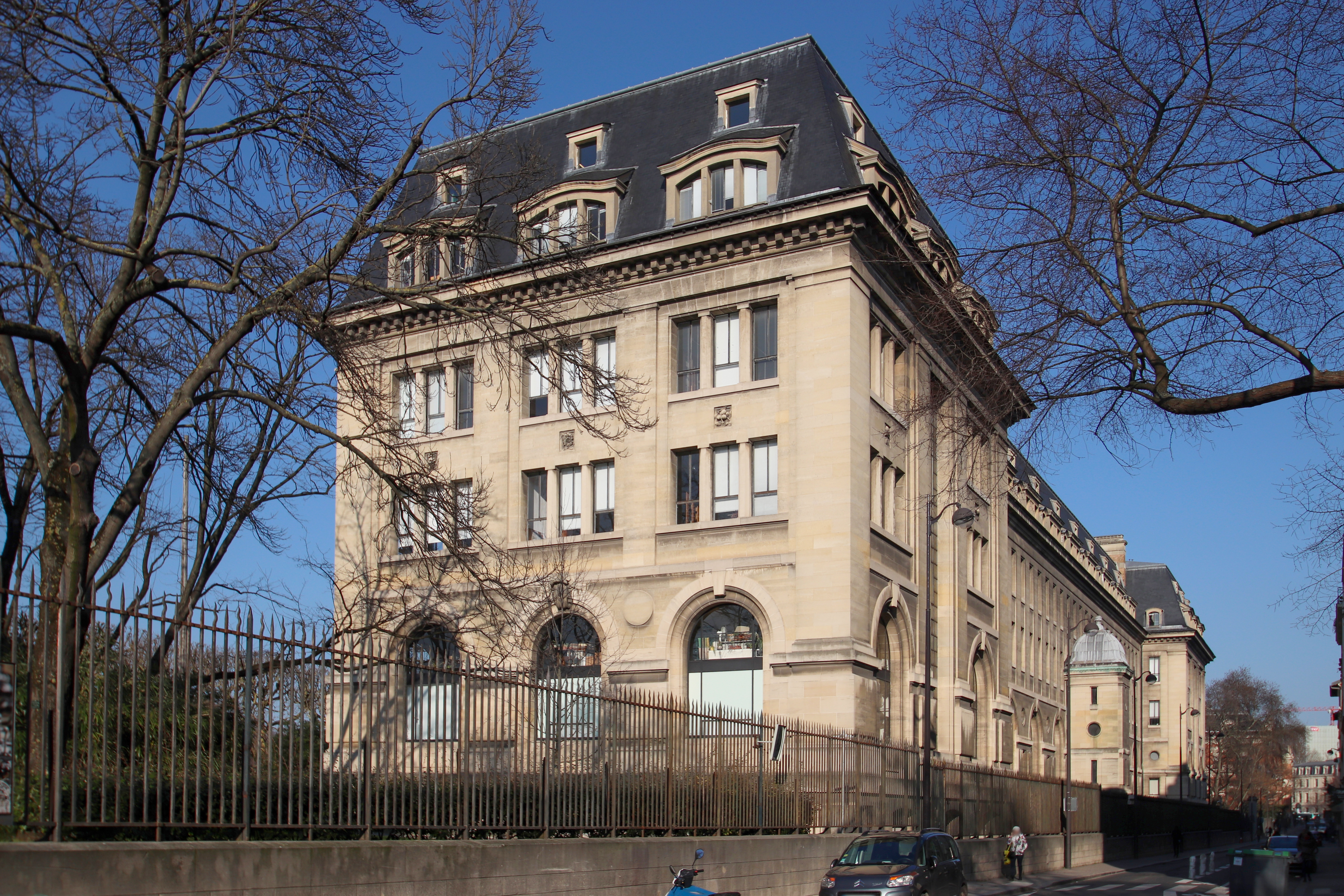
Gallery of Botany

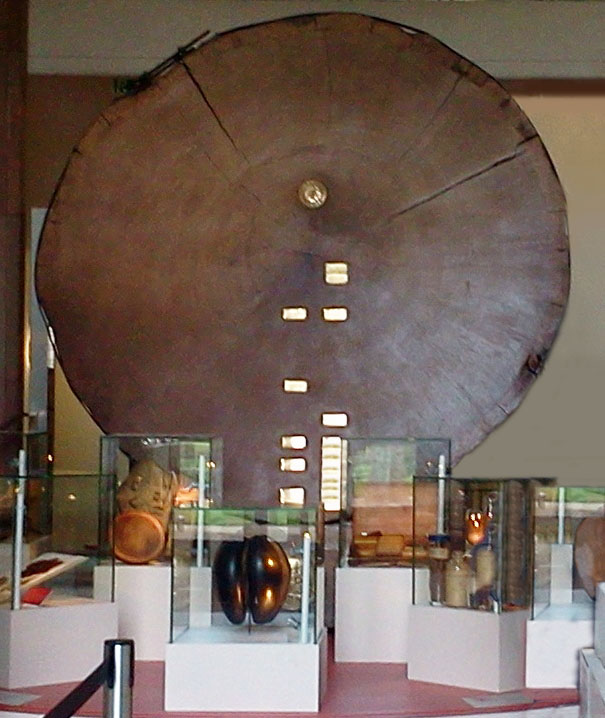
Slice of a giant Sequoia tree, 2200 years old, which fell naturally in 1917

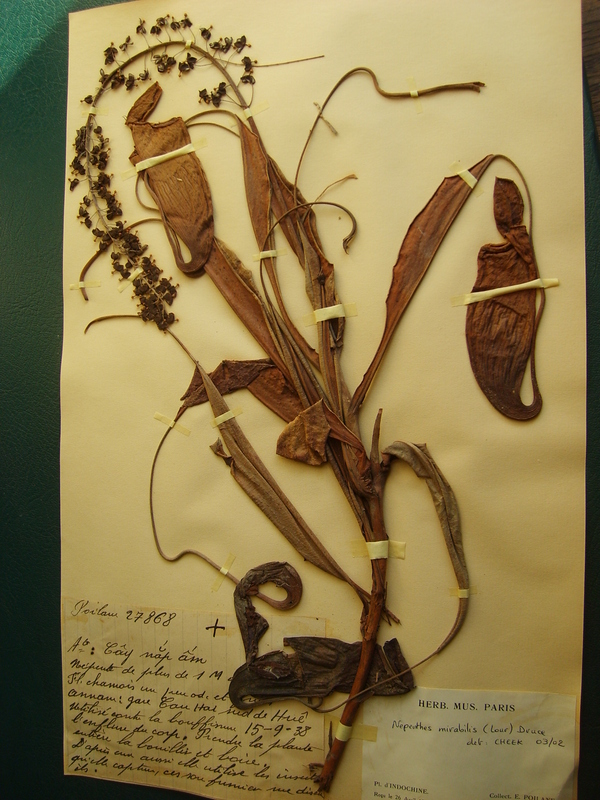
Specimen of Nepenthes mirabilis from the Herbier National

In front of the Gallery of Botany is the oldest tree in Paris, a "Robinier Faux Acacia" brought to France from America in 1601. The gallery was built in 1930–1935 with a grant from the Rockefeller Foundation. The gallery keeps the Herbier National, specimens of all known plant species, with 7.5 million plants represented. The ground floor gallery is used for temporary exhibitions.

=== Gallery of Paleontology and Comparative Anatomy ===
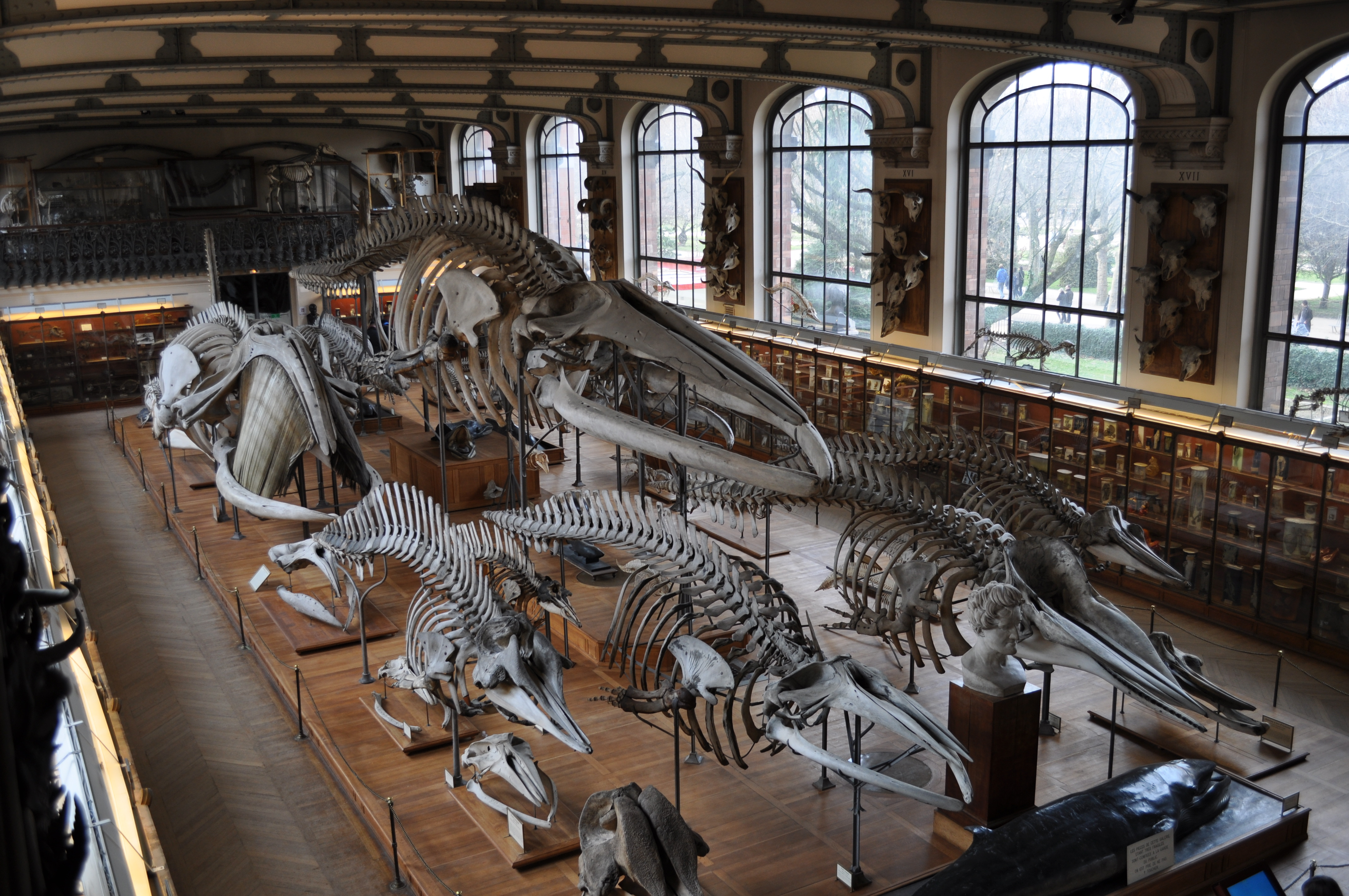
Gallery of Paleontology and comparative anatomy

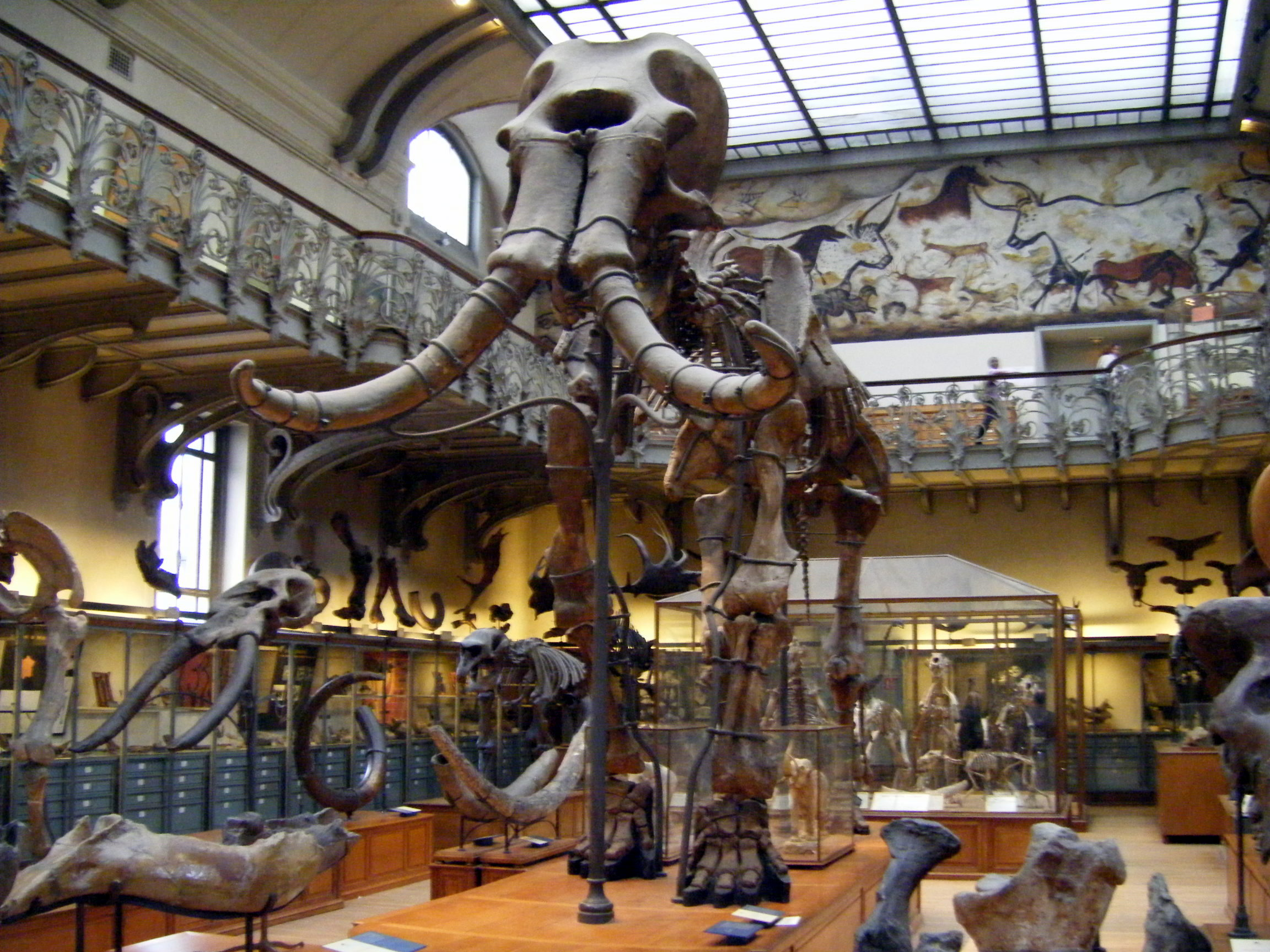
A southern mammoth skeleton in the Gallery of Palaeontology and Comparative Anatomy

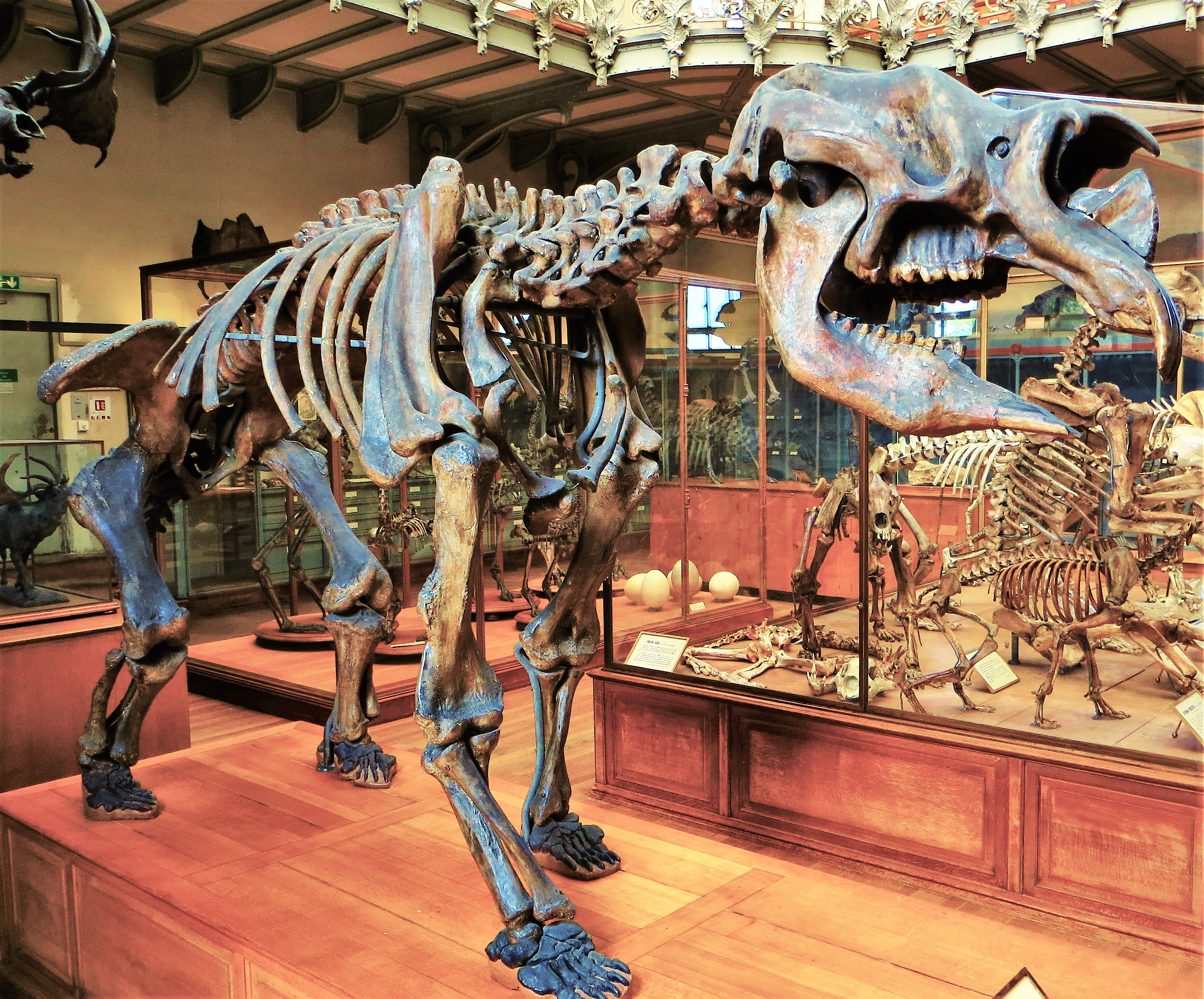
Skeleton of a Diprotodon

This gallery is next to the Iris garden, which contains 260 varieties of Iris. The building was constructed between 1894 and 1897 by Ferdinand Dutert, a specialist in metallic architecture, whose most famous building was the Gallery of Machines at the 1889 Paris Exposition. The gallery was expanded in 1961 with a brick addition by architect Henri Delage. The interior is highly decorated with lace-like iron stairways and detail. It displays a large collection of fossilized skeletons of dinosaurs and other large vertebrates.

== Gardens ==
=== Formal Garden ===
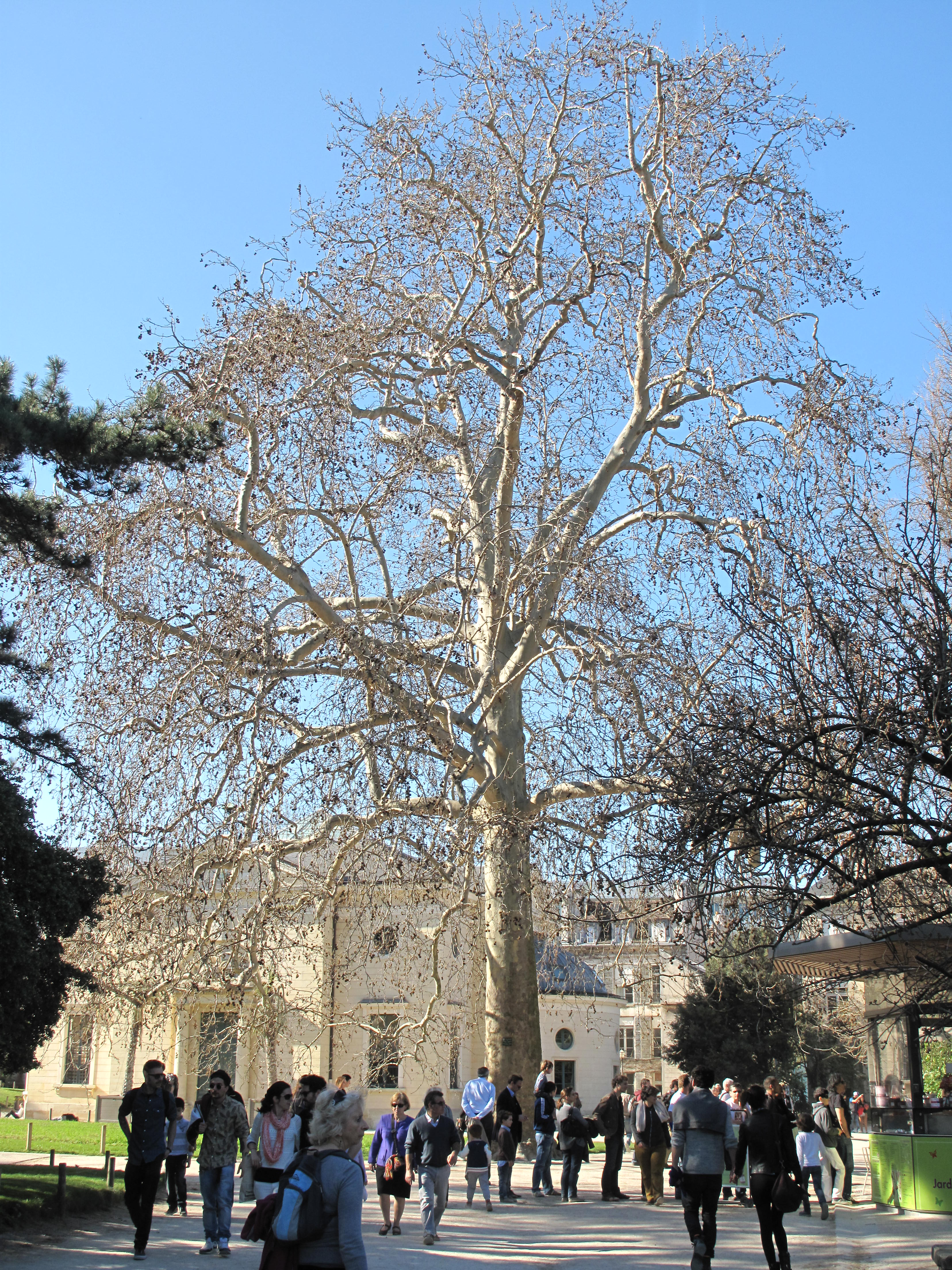
Oriental plane planted by Buffon in 1785

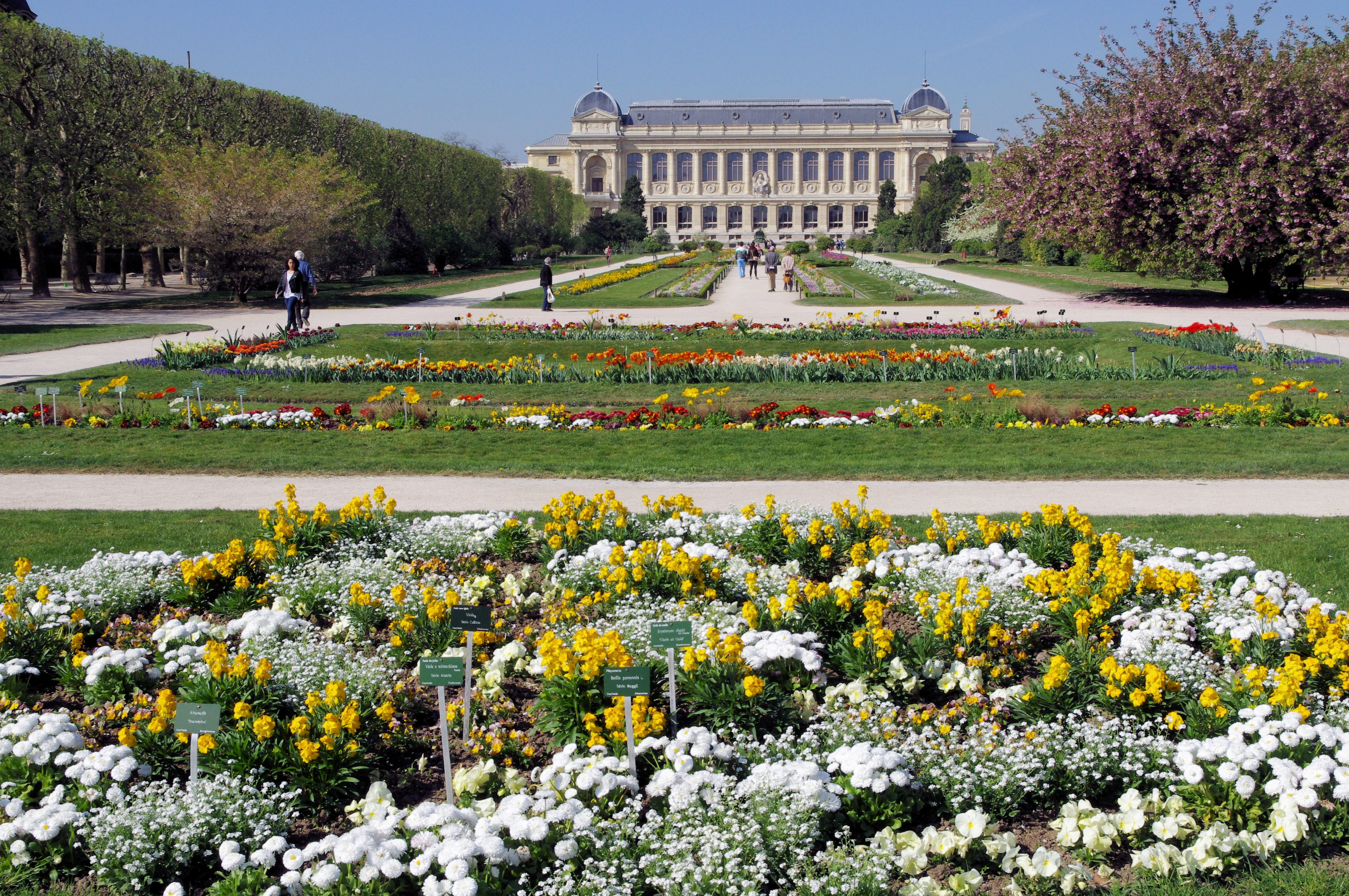
The formal gardens

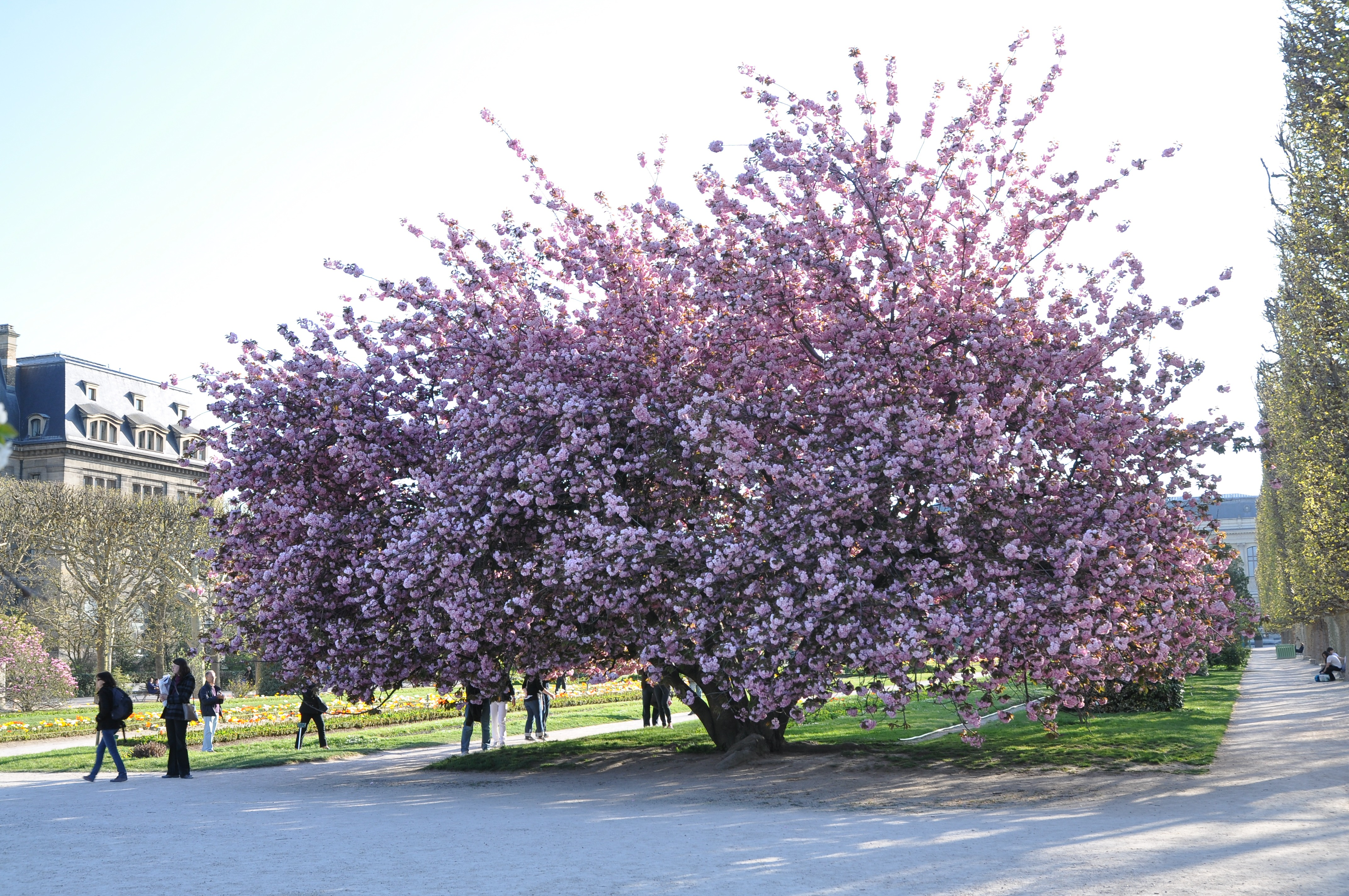
Prunus serrulata 'Kanzan', or Japanese cherry tree

The garden covers an area of twenty-four hectares (59 acres). It is bordered by the River Seine on the east, on the west by the Rue Geofroy-Saint-Hilaire, on the south by the Rue Buffon, and on the north by Rue Cuvier, all streets named for French scientists whose studies were carried out within the garden and its museums.

The main entrance is on the east, along the Seine, at Place Valhubert, reaching to the Grand Gallery, which copies its width. It is in the style of a French formal garden and extends for five hundred meters (550 yards) between two geometrically trimmed rows of plane trees. Its rectangula beds contain over a thousand plants. This part of the garden is bordered on the left by a row of galleries, and on the right by the School of Botany, the Alpine Garden, and greenhouses.

The iron grill gateways and fence at Place Valubuert were created in the beginning of the formal garden. On the east is a statue of the botanist Jean-Baptiste Lamarck, the director the school of botany beginning in 1788. He is best known for devising the first coherent theory of biological evolution.

At the other end of the formal garden, facing the Grand gallery, is a statue of another major figure in the garden's history, the naturalist Buffon, in a dressing gown, seated comfortably in an armchair atop the skin of a lion, holding a bird in his hand. Between the statue and the Gallery is the Esplanade Mine Edwards, beneath which is the Zoothéque, the massive underground storage area for the museum's collections. It is not open to the public.

=== Greenhouses ===
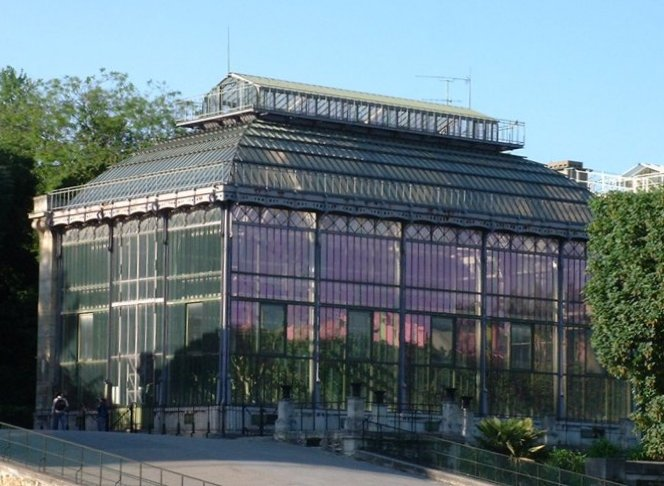
The "Serre Mexicaine" greenhouse built (1834–1836) by Charles Rohault de Fleury, an early example of French glass and metal architecture

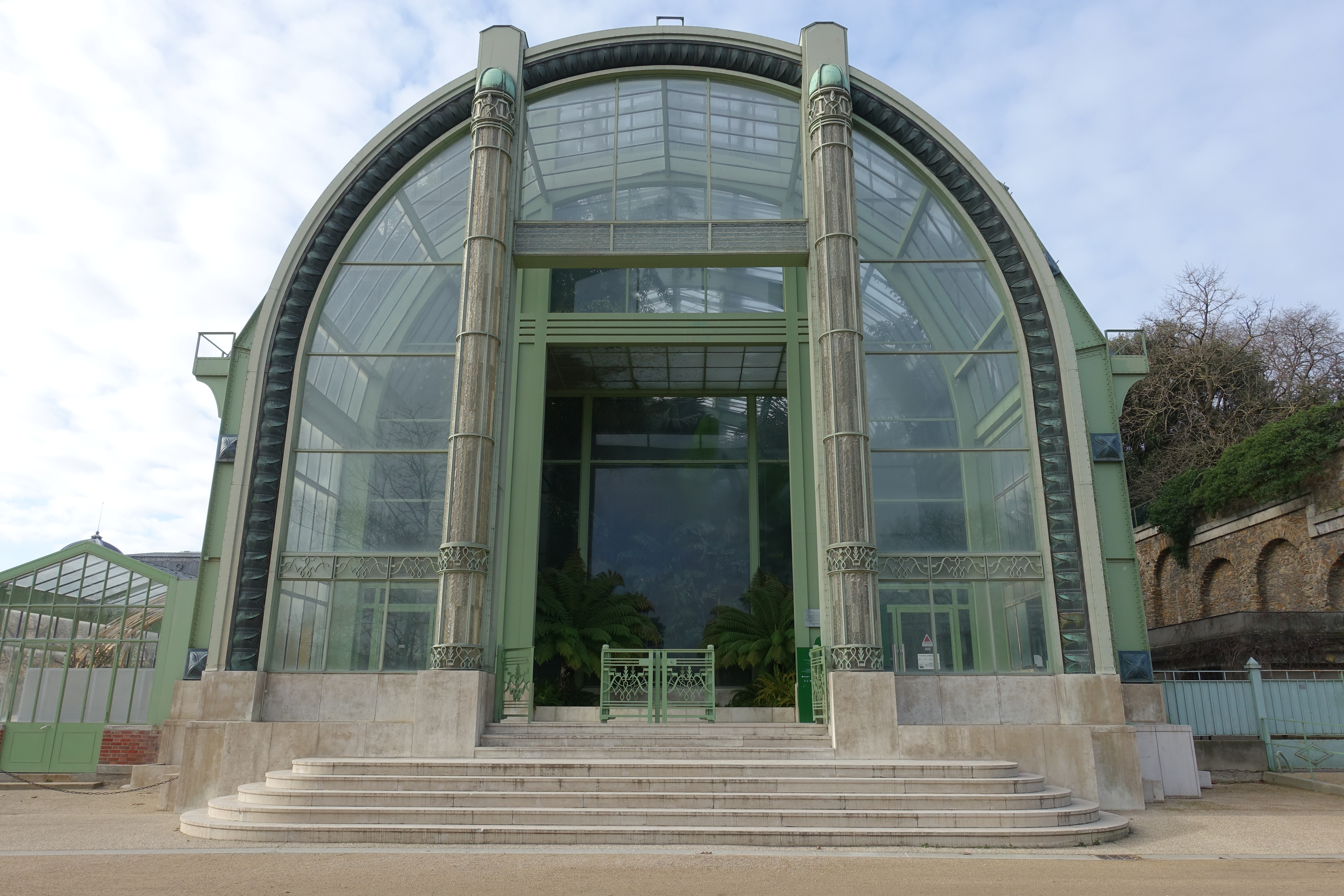
Art Deco entrance of the "Jardin d'hiver" greenhouse (1937)

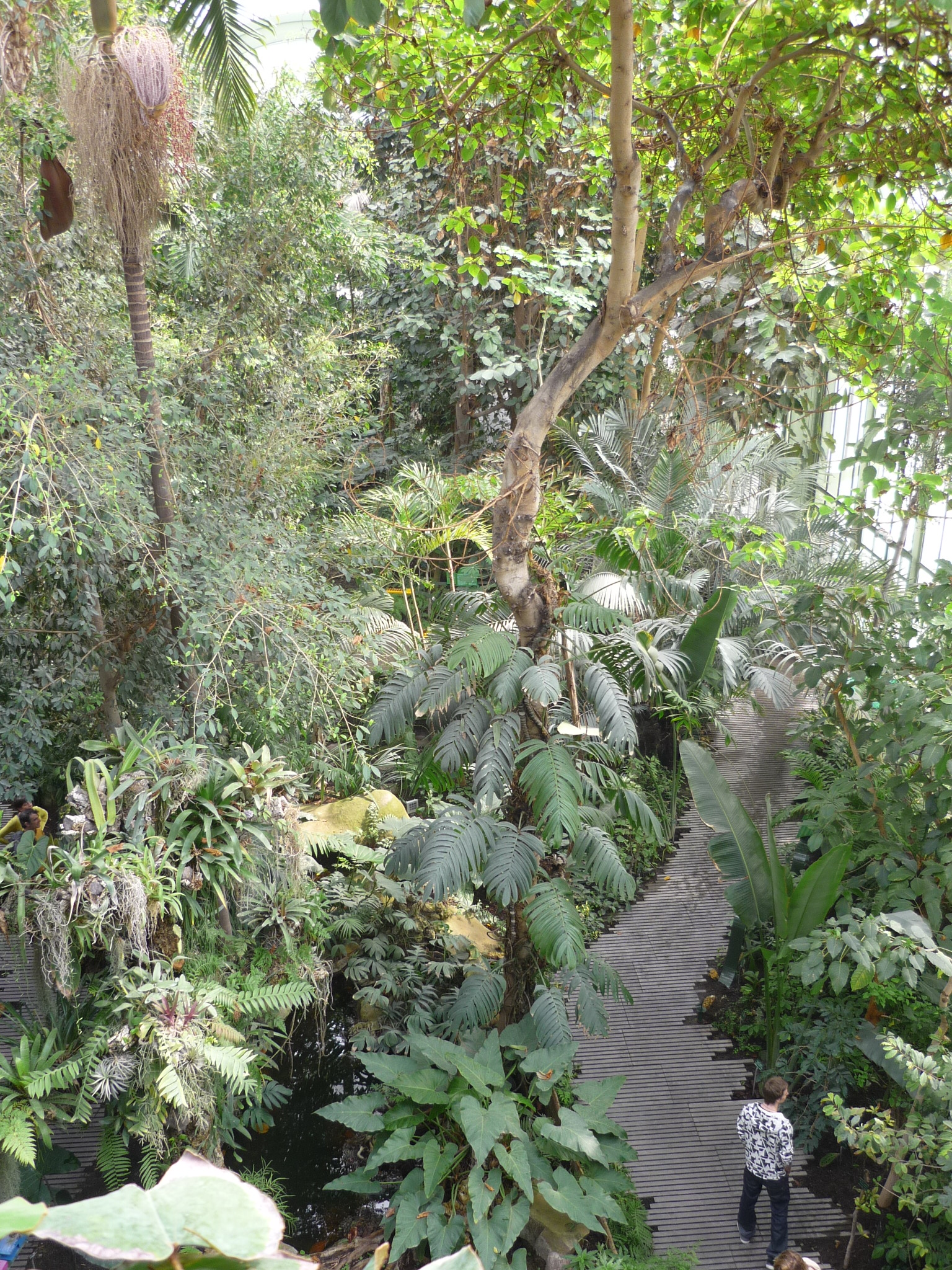
Path in interior of the "Jardin d'hiver" greenhouse

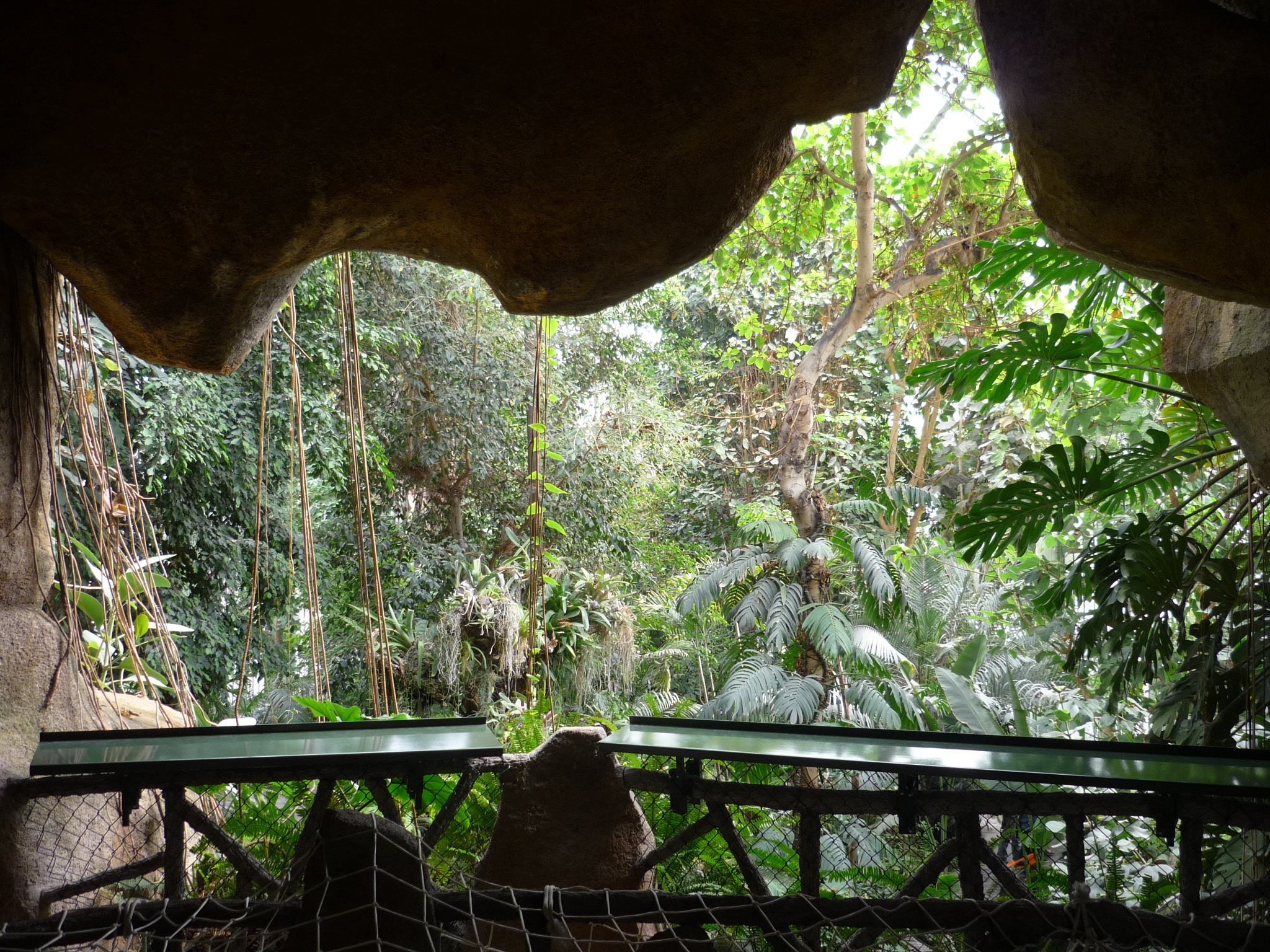
Interior of the "Jardin d'hiver" greenhouse

Four large greenhouses are placed in a row to the right front of the Gallery of Evolution, facing onto the Esplanade Milne-Edwards. They replaced the earliest greenhouses, built on the same site in the early 18th century, to house the plants brought to France from tropical climates by French explorers and naturalists. The Mexican greenhouse, which houses succulents, is separated by an alley from the Australian greenhouse, which hosts plants from that country. They were built between 1834 and 1836 by the architect Rohault de Fleury. Each of the two greenhouses is 20 meters by 12 meters in size. Their iron and glass structure was revolutionary for Paris, preceding by fifteen years the similar pavilions built by Victor Baltard for the Paris markets of Les Halles.

A larger structure, the "Jardin d'hiver" (Winter Garden), covering 750 square meters, was designed by René Berger and completed in 1937. It features an Art Deco entrance, between two illuminated glass and iron pillars built for nighttime visits. The heating system keeps the interior temperature at 22 degrees Celsius year-round, creating a suitable environment for bananas, palms, giant bamboo, and other tropical plants. Its central feature, designed to create a more natural environment, is a fifteen-meter-high waterfall.

=== Alpine Garden ===
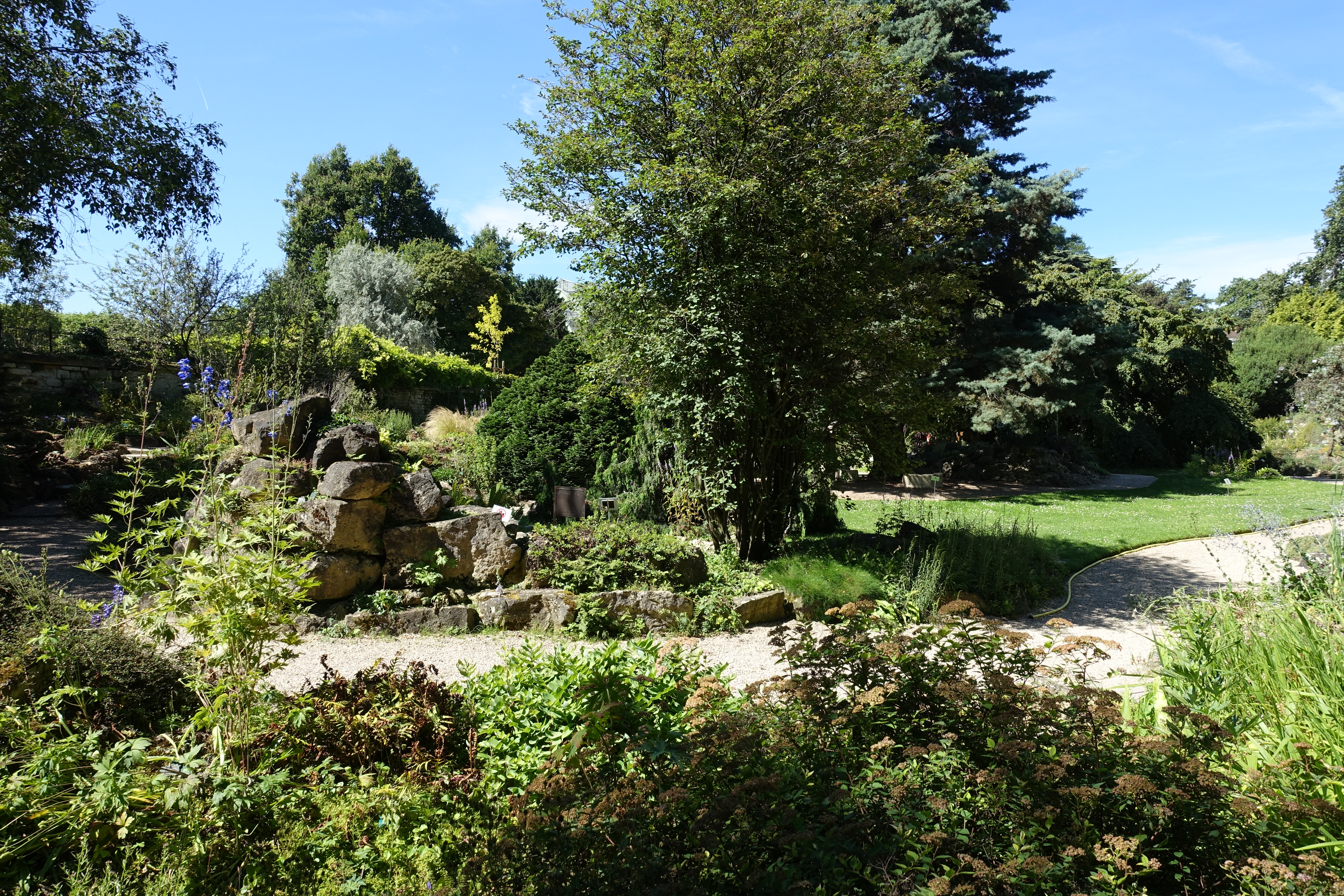
In the Alpine Garden

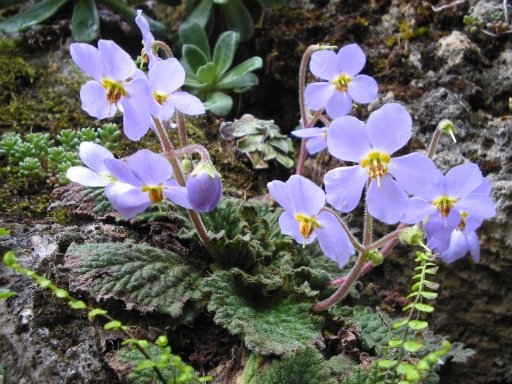
Ramonda myconi flower, from the Pyrenees

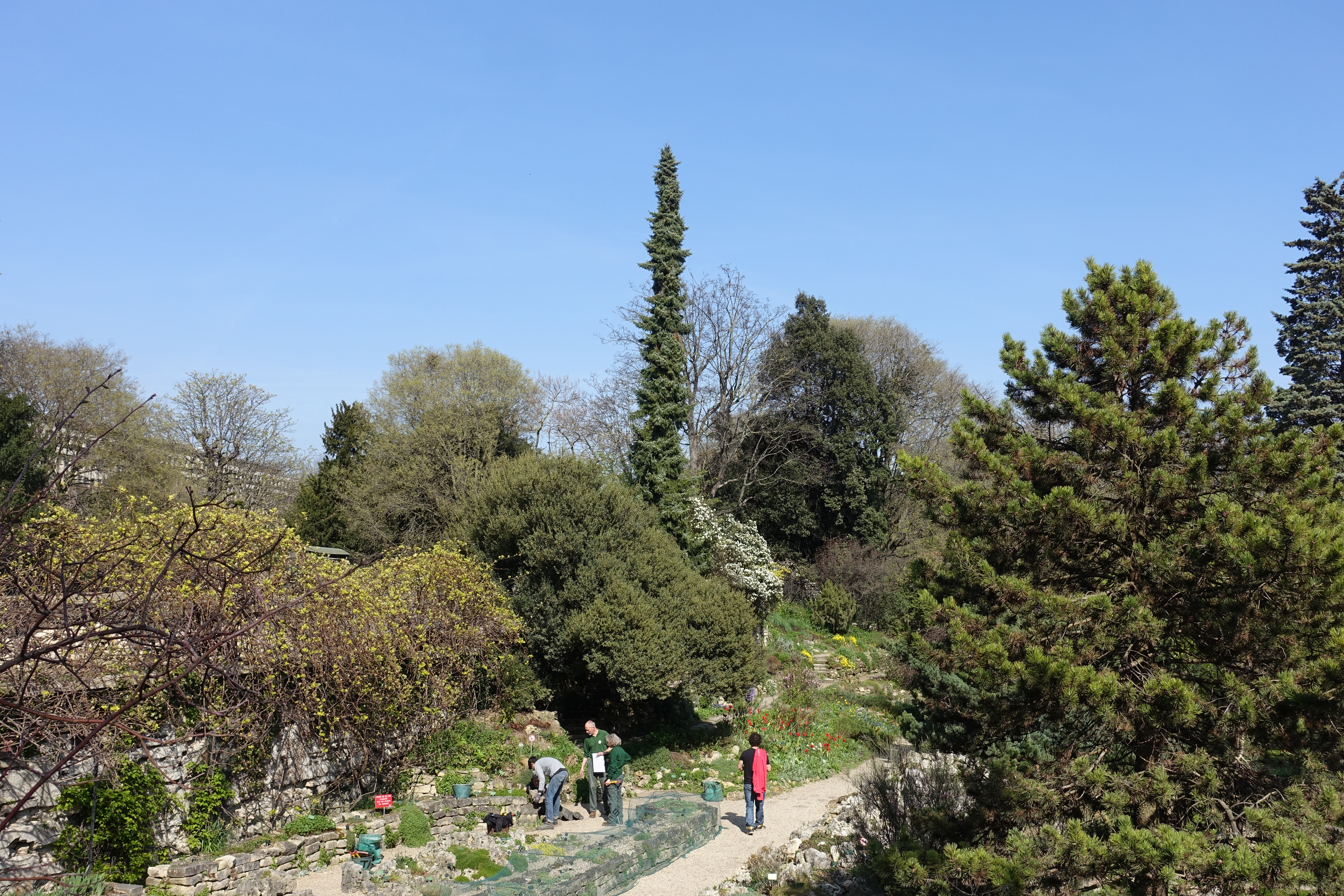
Portion of the Alpine Garden

The Alpine Garden was created in 1931, and is about three meters higher than the other parts of the garden. It is divided into two zones, connected by a tunnel. It contains several different microclimates, controlled by the water distribution, the orientation toward the sun, the type of soil and the distribution of the rocks. It is home to plants of Corsica, the Caucasus, North America, and the Himalayas. The oldest plant is a pistachio tree, planted in about 1700. This tree was the subject of research by the botanist Sebastien Vaillant in the 18th century which confirmed the sexuality of plants. Another ancient tree found there is the metasequoia, or dawn redwood, a primitive conifer.

=== School of Botany Garden ===
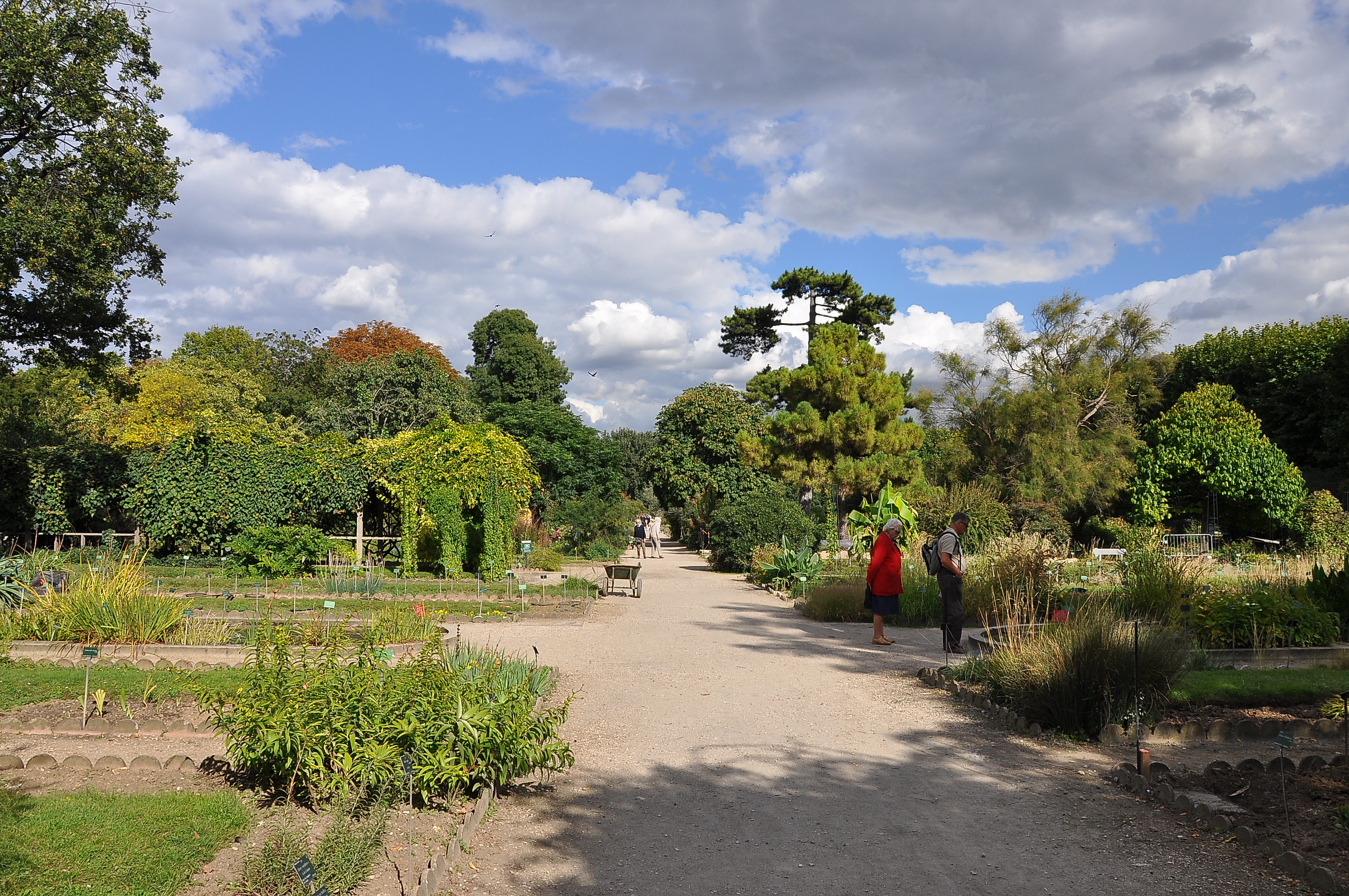
School of Botany garden

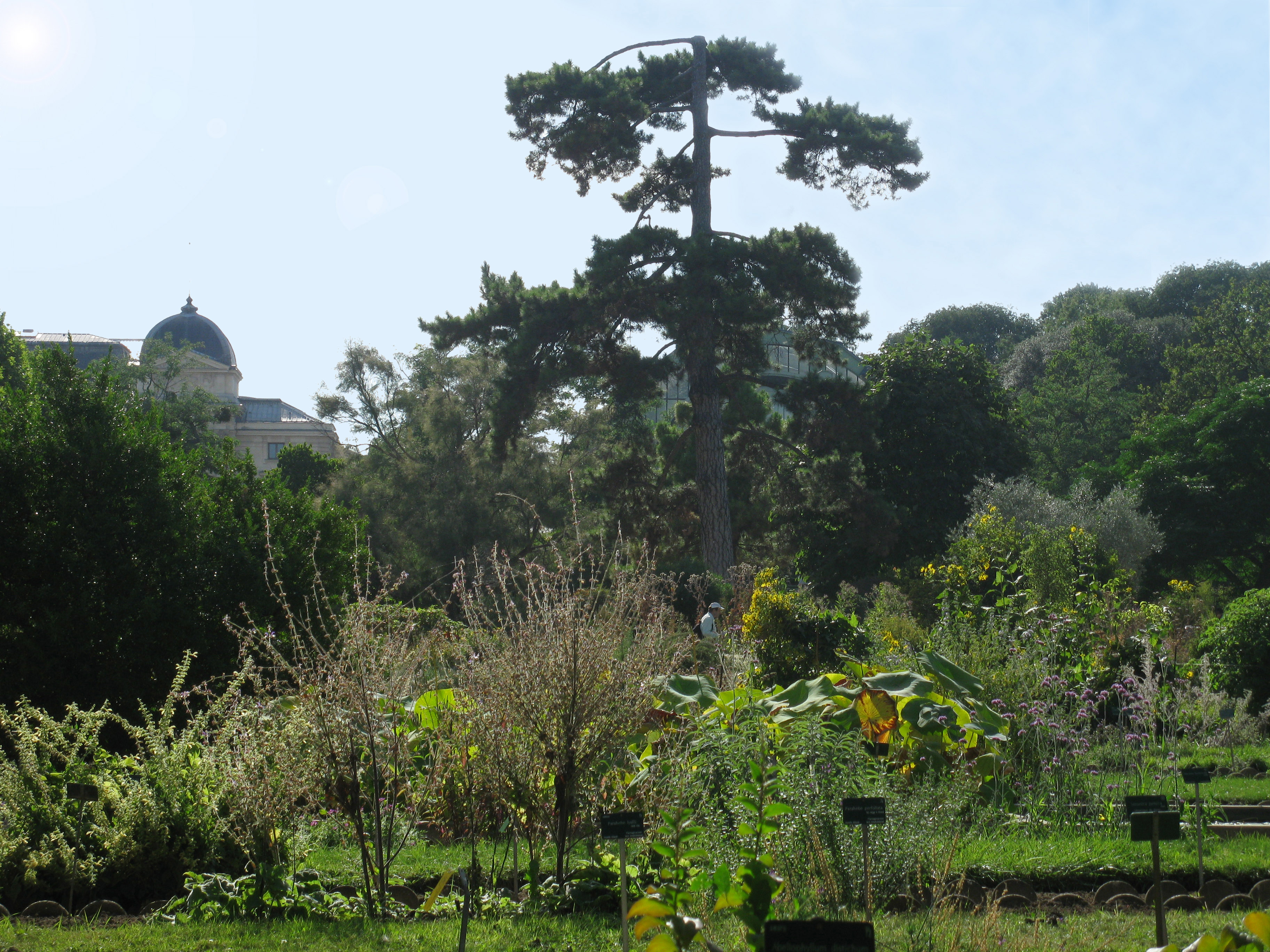
The black pine of Laricio planted in the School of Botany garden in 1774

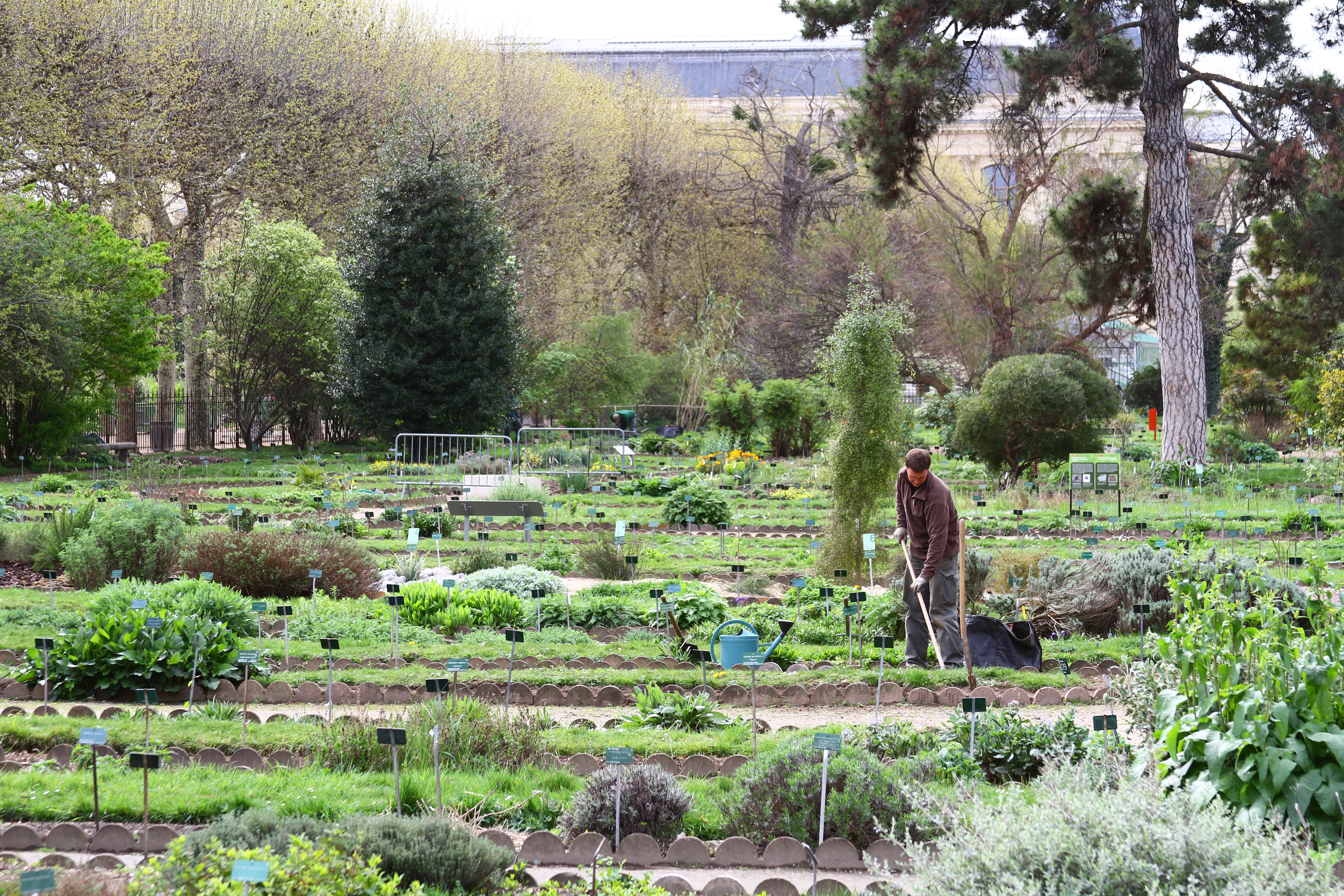
Garden of the School of Botany

A large section alongside the formal garden, with an entrance on the Allee Bequrerel, belongs to the School of Botany, and is dedicated to plants that have medicinal or economic uses. It was originally created in the 18th century, and now has over three thousand eight hundred specimens, organised by genus and family. Regular tours by museum guides are given of this section. One of its special attractions is the "Pinus nigra" or black pine, of the variety Laricio, from Corsica, which was planted in the garden by Jussieu in the 1770s.

=== The Small Labyrinth ===
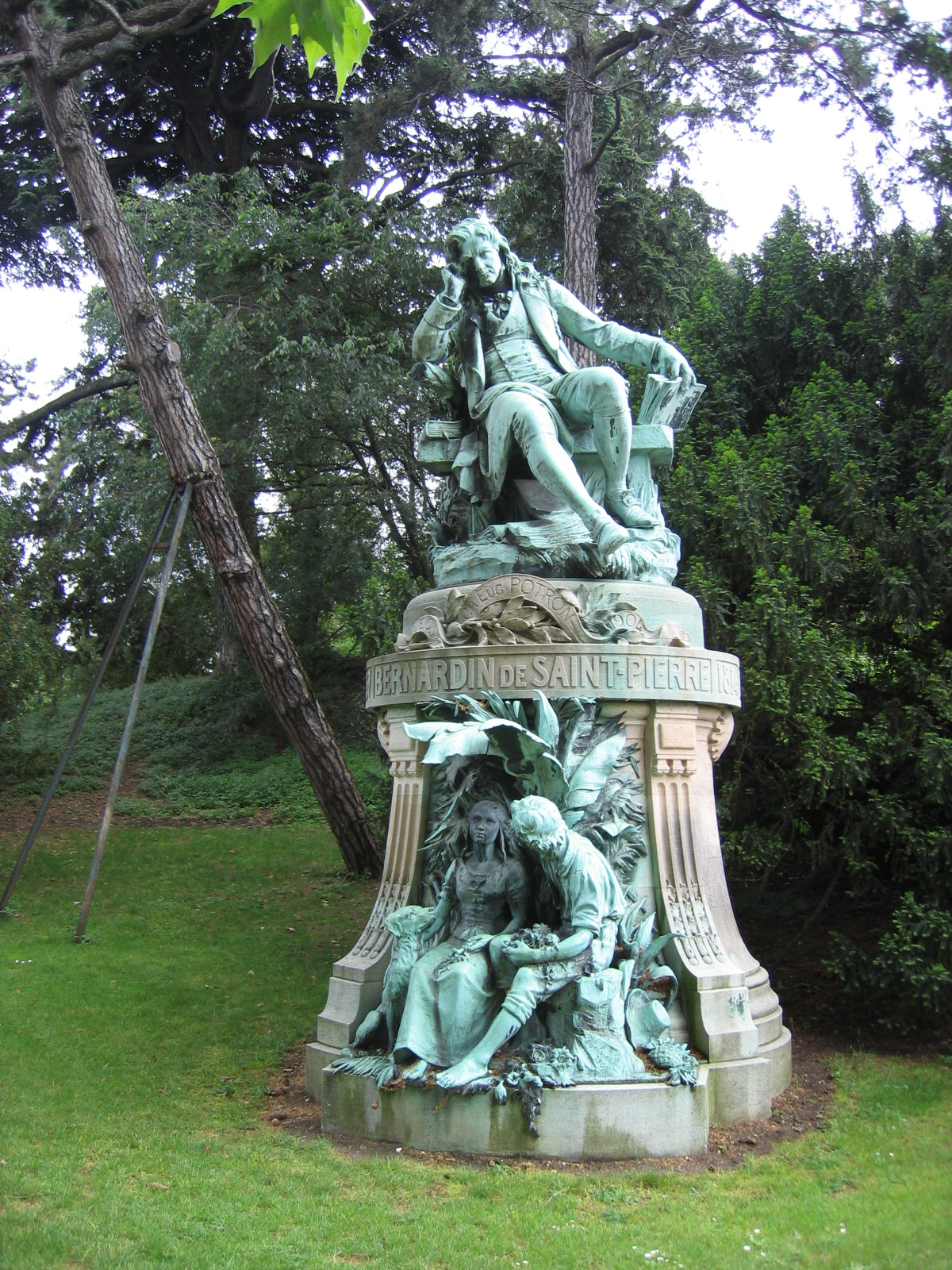
Monument to garden director Bernardin de Saint-Pierre and his famous literary characters, "Paul et Virginie"

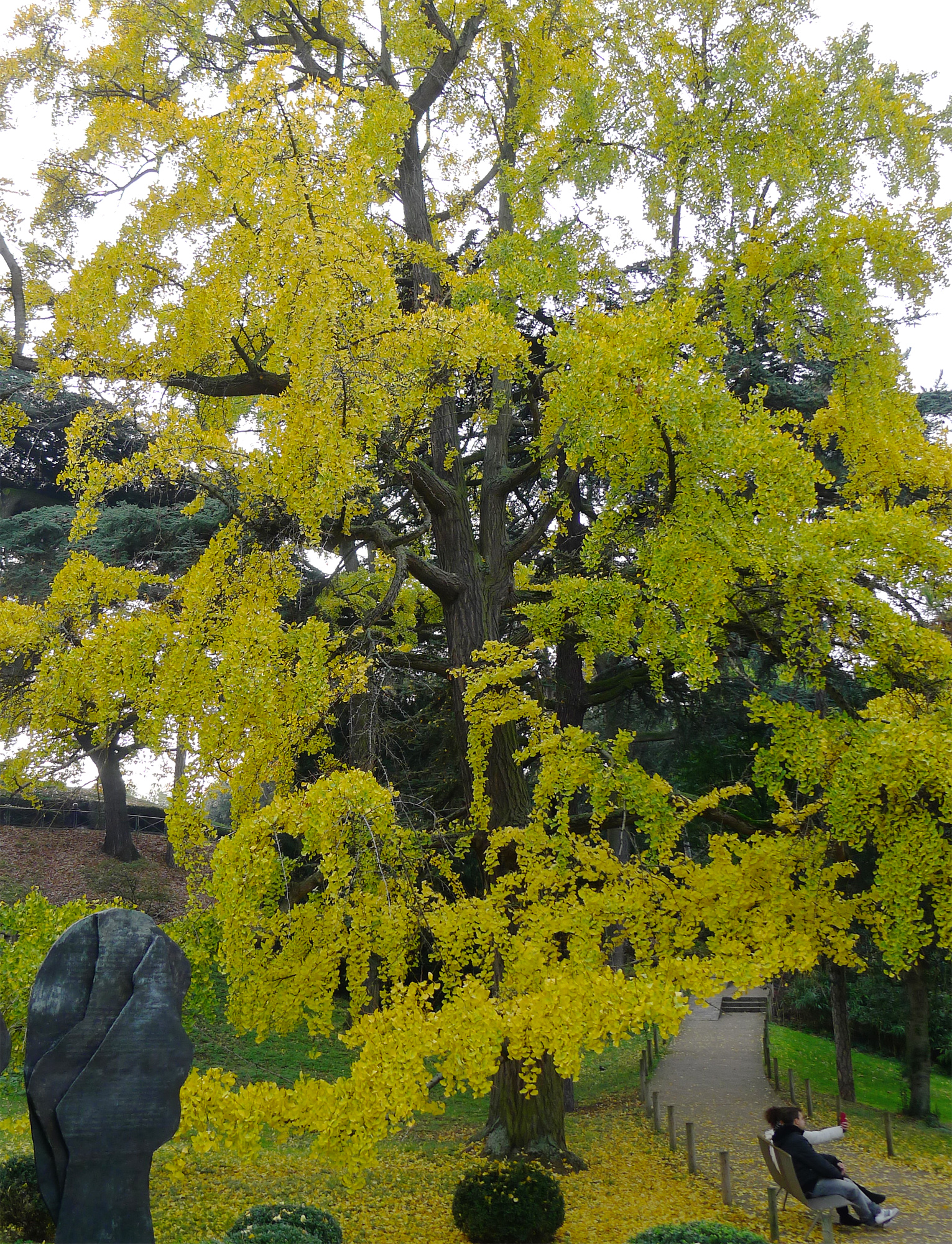
The Ginkgo biloba in the small labyrinth

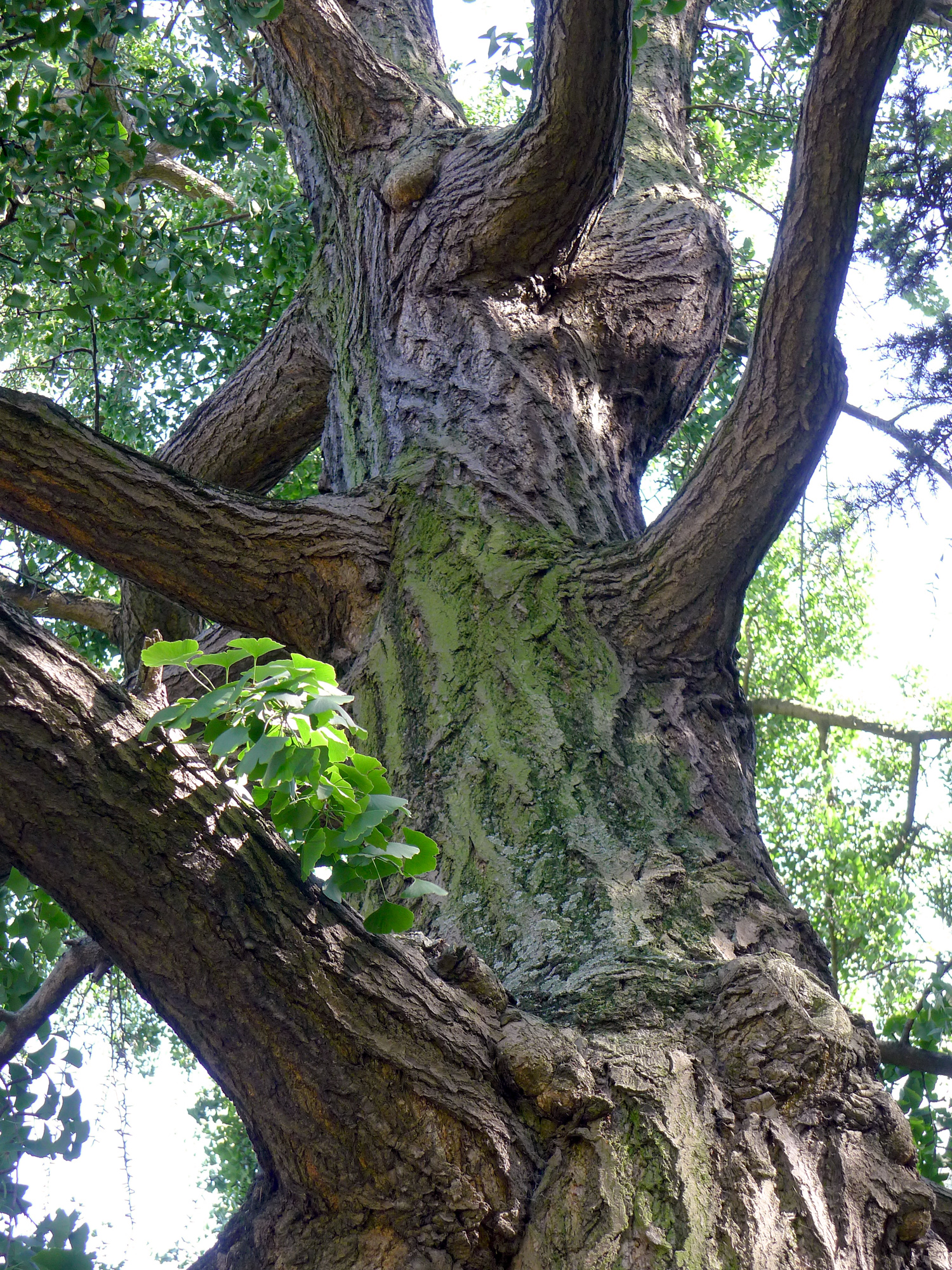
Detail of the Ginkgo biloba

The small garden is placed directly behind the Winter Garden greenhouse. Its prominent features are a large oriental plane tree from the Orient, planted by Buffon in 1785, and a Ginkgo biloba, a tree originating in China considered a living fossil, since traces show that these trees existed in the Second Era of living things, as defined by botanists. It was planted in 1811.

In the center of the garden is a monument to the botanist Bernardin de Saint-Pierre, the last director of the garden named by the King before the French Revolution, and the creator of the menagerie. He is better known in France as the author of a well-known romantic novel, Paul et Virginie, published in 1788.

=== The Butte Copeaux and the Grand Labyrinth ===
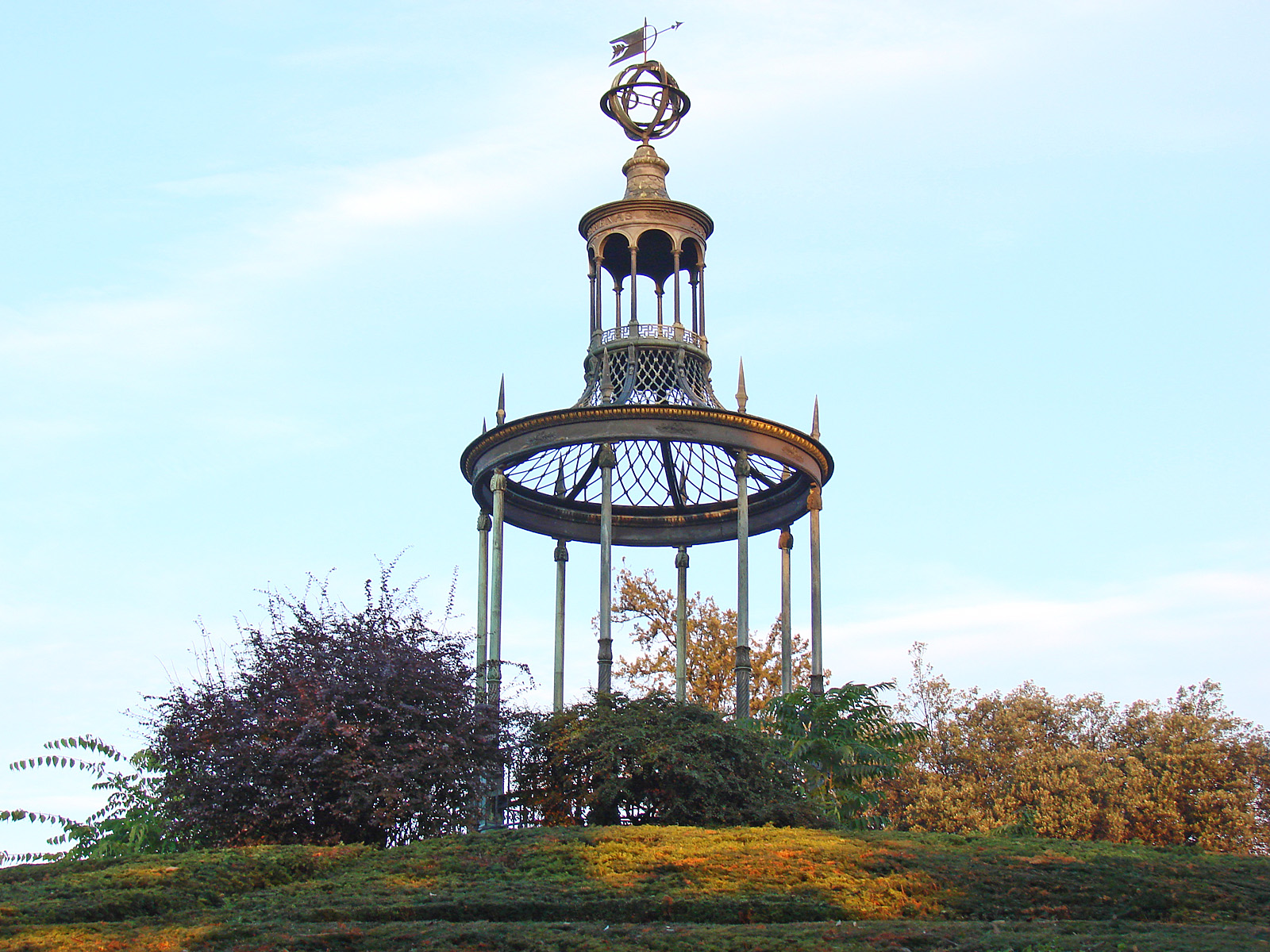
The Gloriette of Buffon

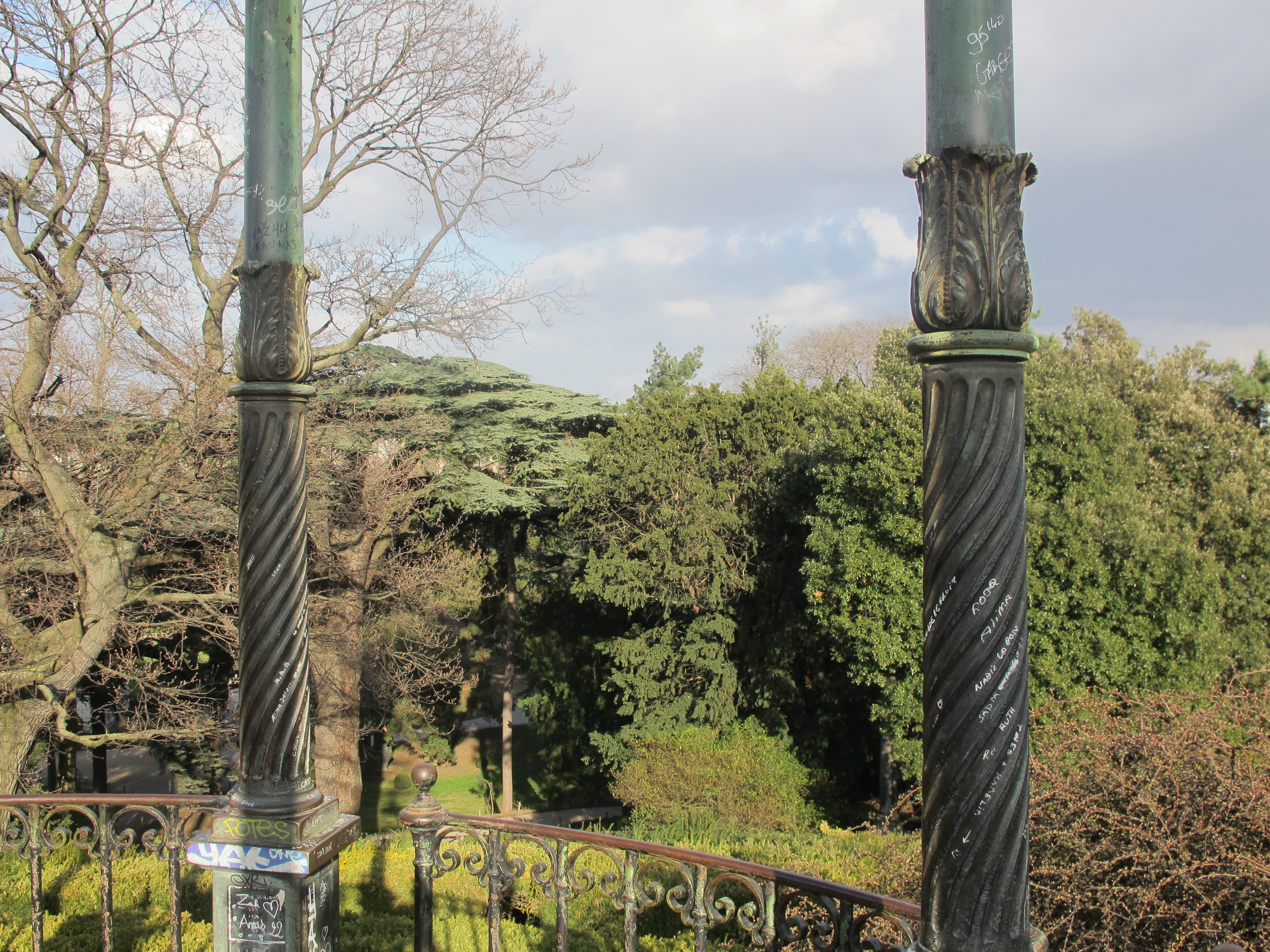
The view from the Gloriette and its iron columns

The Grand Labyrinth features a winding path to the top of the Butte Copeaux, a hill overlooking the garden. It was originally created under Louis XIII, then redone in its present form under Louis XVI, on the site of an old garbage dump. At the beginning of the upward path is a Cedar of Lebanon, planted in 1734 by Jussieu, with a trunk four meters in circumference. The butte was largely planted with trees from the Mediterranean, including an old erable tree from Crete planted in 1702 and still in place. including from in it is topped by a picturesque 18th-century cast-iron viewing platform, the oldest work of iron architecture in Paris. The labyrinth was created under Louis XIII, then redone by the garden director Buffon for Louis XVI.

At the top is a neoclassical viewing platform called the Gloriette de Buffon. It was made of cast iron, bronze and copper in 1786–87, using metal from the foundry owned by Buffon. It is considered the oldest metallic structure in Paris. The eight iron columns carry a roof in the shape of a Chinese hat, topped by a lantern with a frieze decorated with swastikas a popular motif in the period. The top is inscribed with a tribute to Louis XVI, honouring his "justice, humanity, and munificence", as well as a quotation from Buffon, in Latin, translated; "I only count the hours without clouds". It was originally equipped with a precise clock which chimed exactly at noon, but it disappeared in 1795.

Nearby is the Lion Fountain, built in 1834 into the wall of a former reservoir. It is decorated with two bronze lions made in 1863 by the noted animal sculptor Henri Jacquemart.

== The Menagerie ==
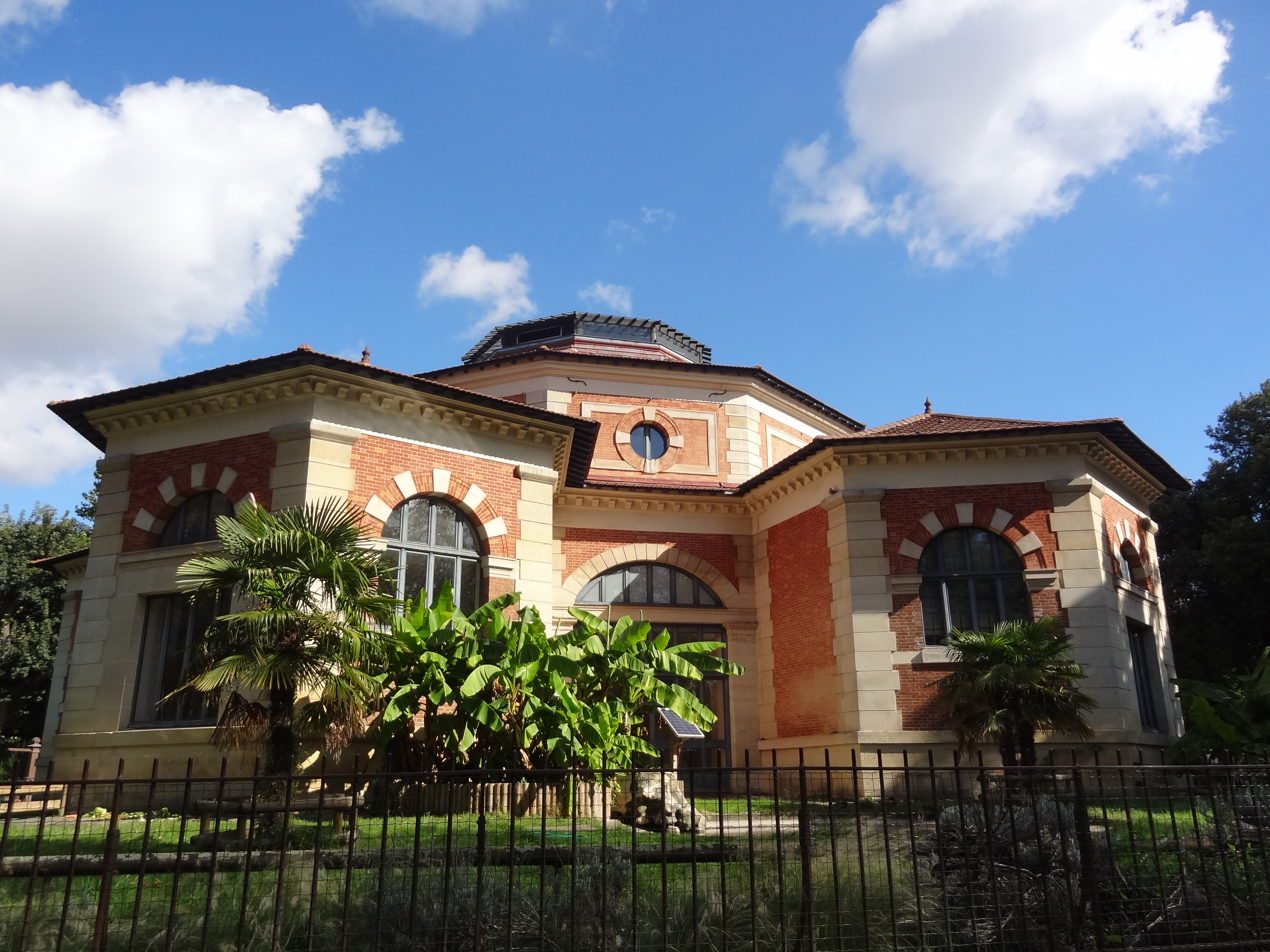
The Rotonda (1804–1812)

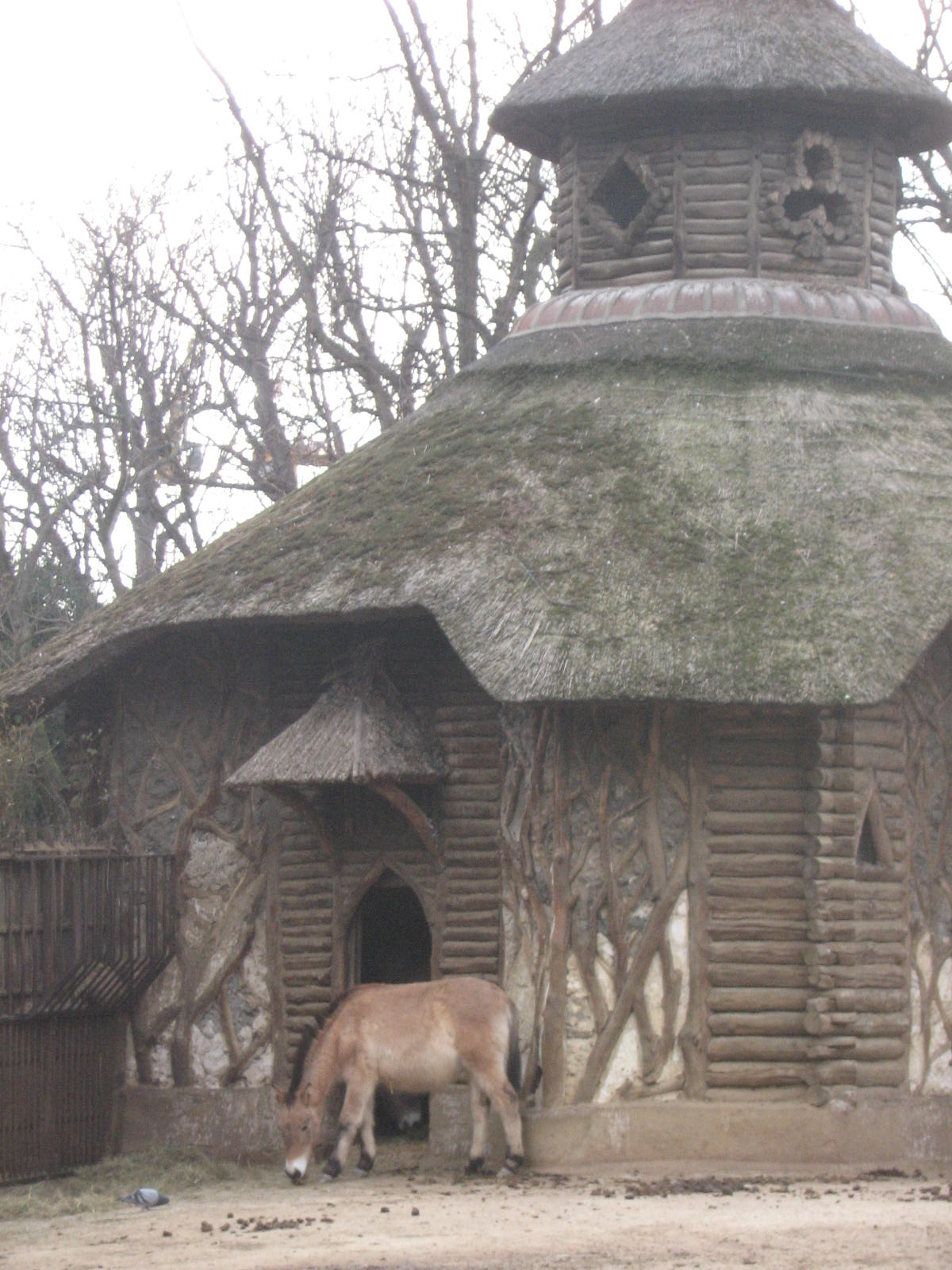
The shelter of horses, by Przewalski

The Menagerie is the second-oldest public zoo in the world still in operation (following the Tiergarten Schönbrunn in Vienna, Austria), founded in 1752. It was laid out in its current form between 1798 and 1836, and occupies 5.5 hectares (14 acres). Besides displaying and studying animals, it has the mission, in cooperation with the zoos of other European cities, to preserve the genetic pool of certain endangered species, with the longer-term goal of trying to re-introduce some of these species into nature.

The menagerie, in the style of 19th century zoos, is composed of a series of fenced areas, separated by paths, each with "Fabriques" or shelters in pictureesque styles, ranging from rustic to Art Deco. The largest building is the rotunda, built of brick and stone between 1804 and 1812, which unites five separate structures. Its form is said to have been inspired by the medal of the Legion of Honor. It was restored in 1988. It formerly contained the large animals of the collection, including the elephants and the famous giraffe given to King Charles X of France, which lived there for twenty-seven years. The trenches around the rotunda were part of the residence of bears. In 1934, most of the large animals were moved to the new zoo in the Bois de Vincennes, and now the building is used mainly for events and receptions.

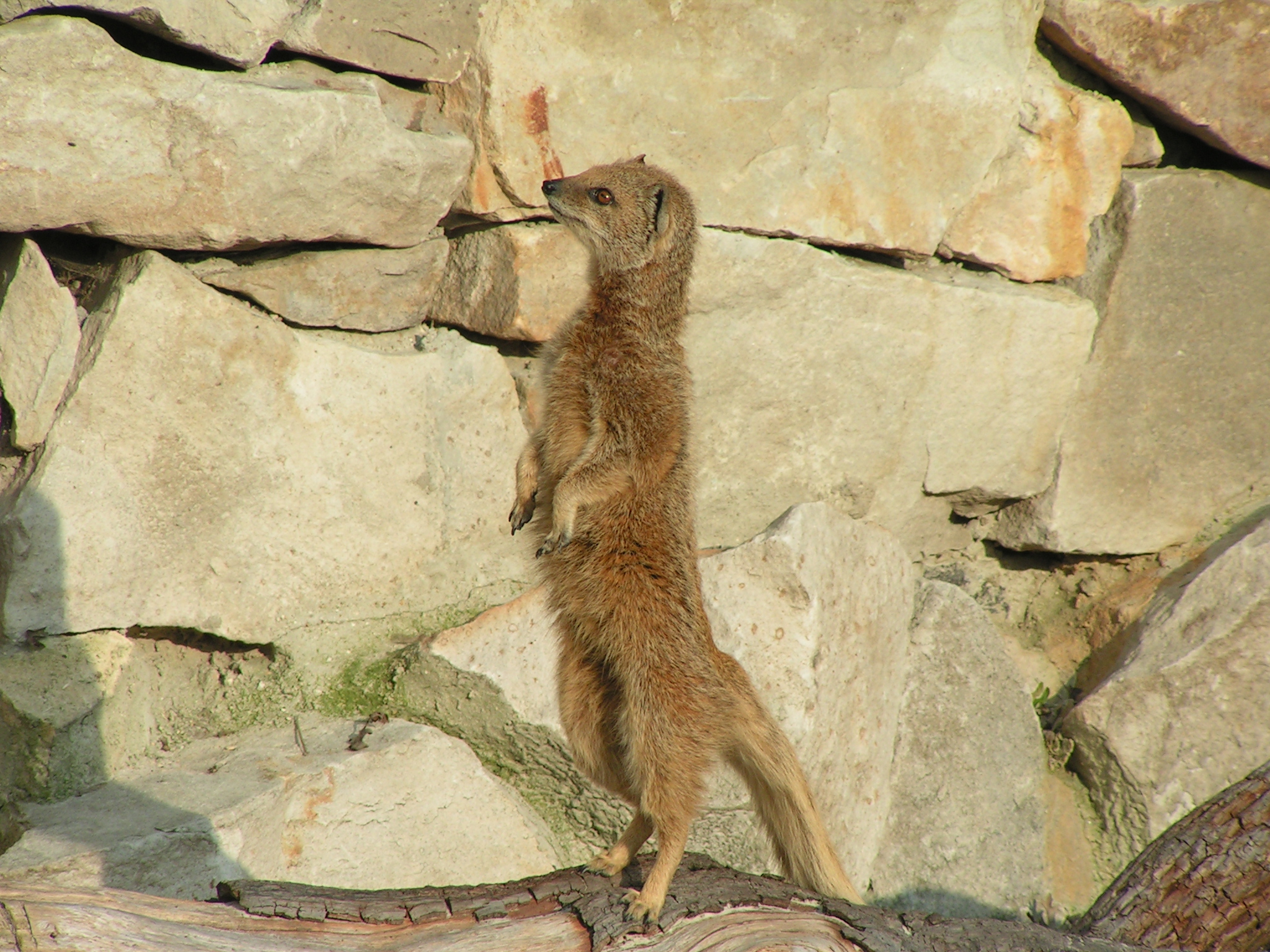
A mongoose in the Jardin des Plantes

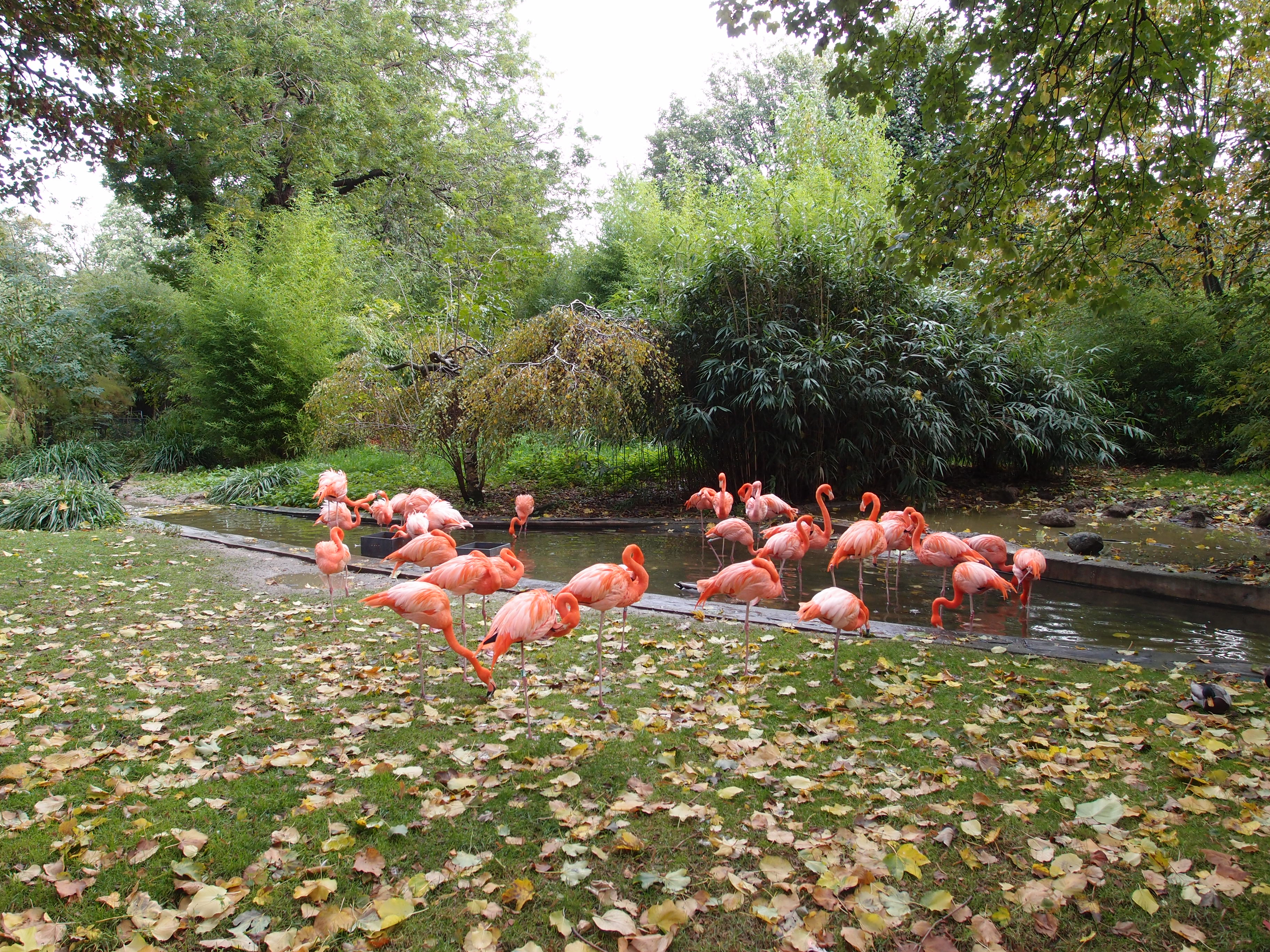
Flamingos in the Jardin des Plantes

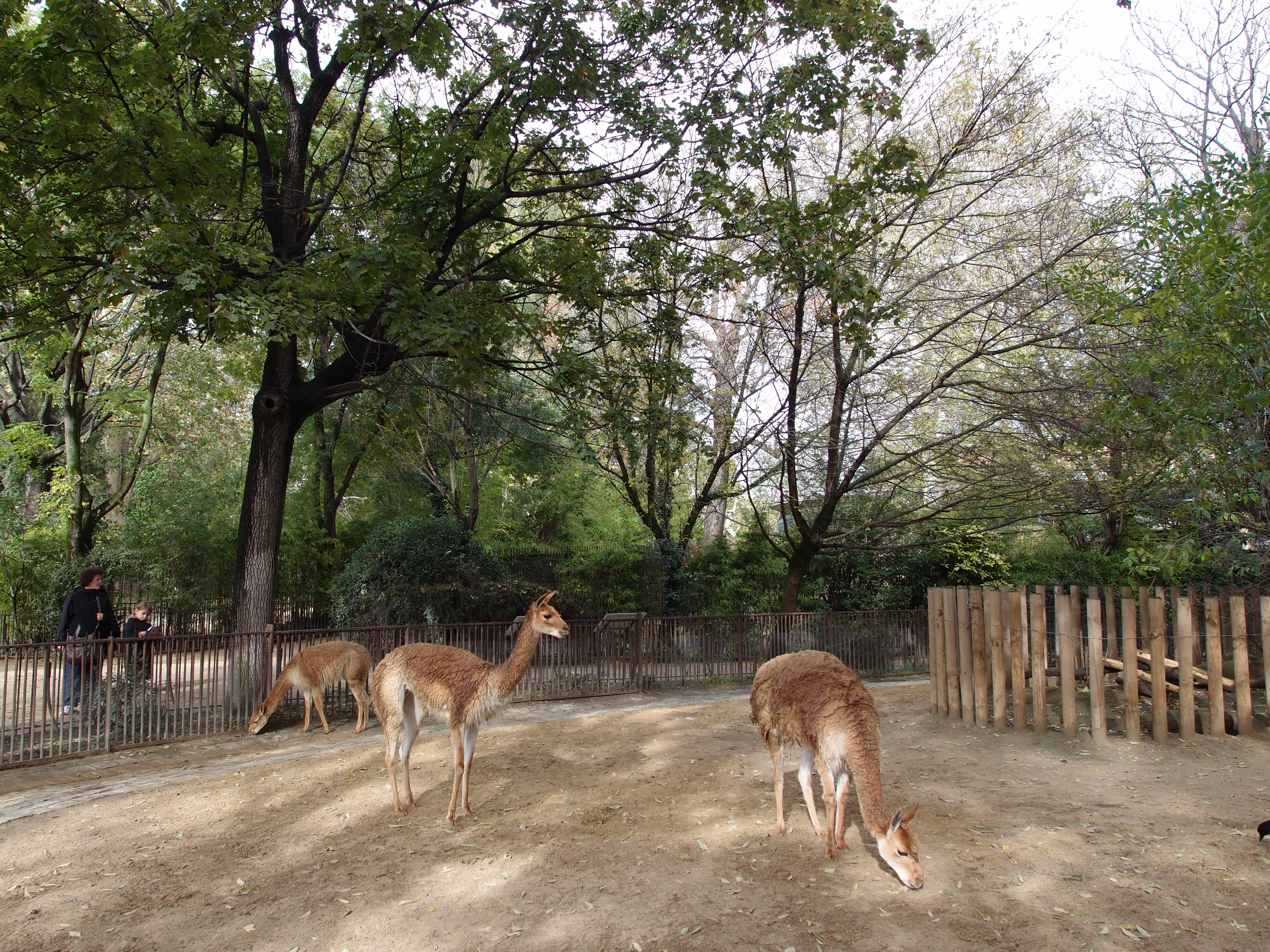
Vicunas in the Jardin des Plantes

The major structures in the Menagerie include the neoclassical Grand Volerie, built for flying animals by Louis-Jules André, the designer of the garden's central building, the Gallery of Evolution. It was built in 1888 of iron, stone and wood, in an oval form. Like the main building of the gardens, it features two neoclassical lantern towers. The Palace of Reptiles is also a work of André. It was built between 1870 and 1874. Its decoration includes a bronze statue of "The Snake Charmer" from 1862.

The Vivarium is a gallery by Emmanuel Pontremoli from 1926; it is a modernist update of a Classical Greek villa, with an Art Deco portico dating from 1926. Other notable buildings include the Art Deco Ape House from 1934, a ceramic-covered oval building with the cages on the exterior. In 1934, the apes were transferred to Vincennes.

== Collection of fossil plants ==
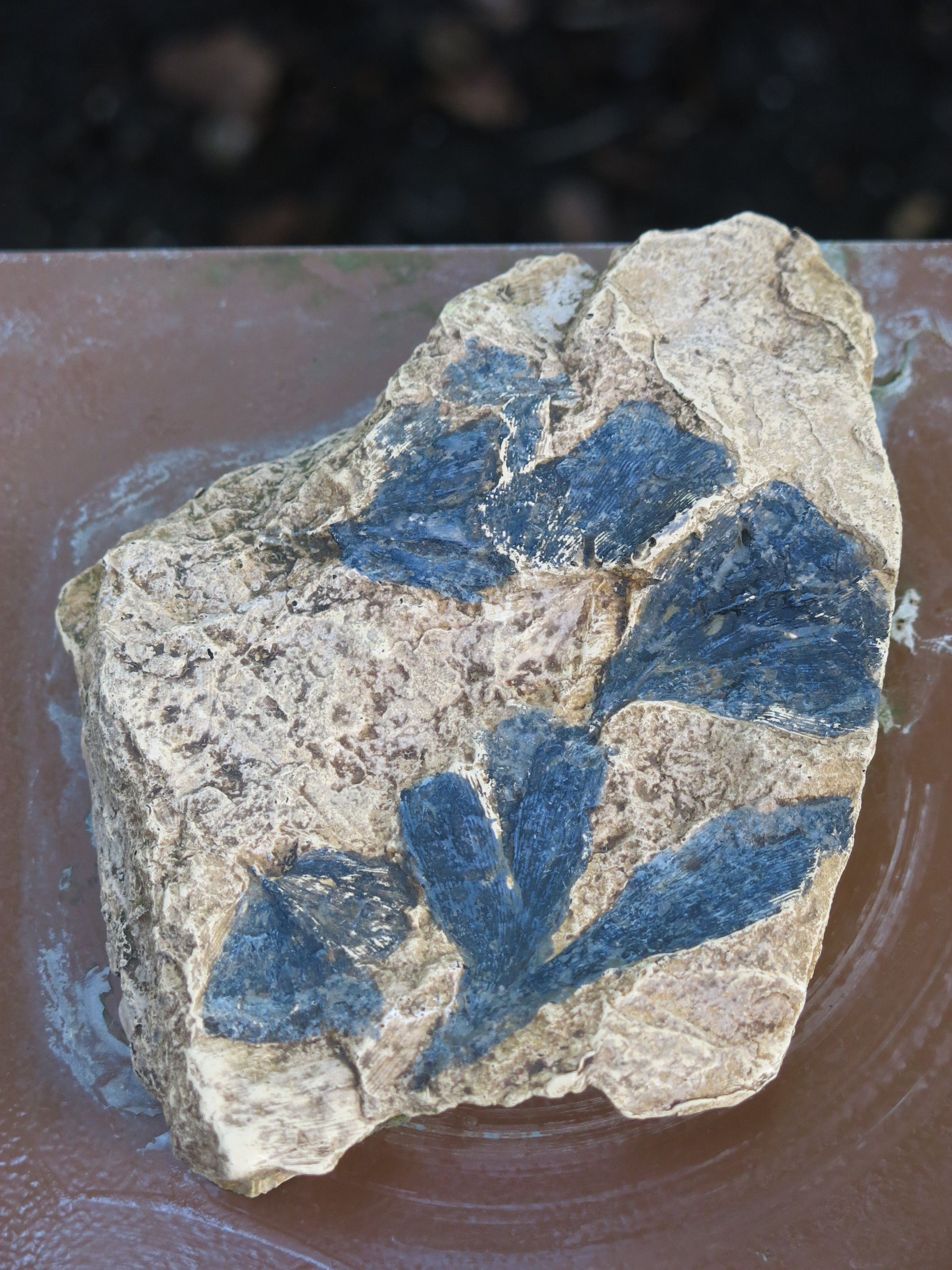
Ginkgo digitata found in Yorkshire, 170 million years old

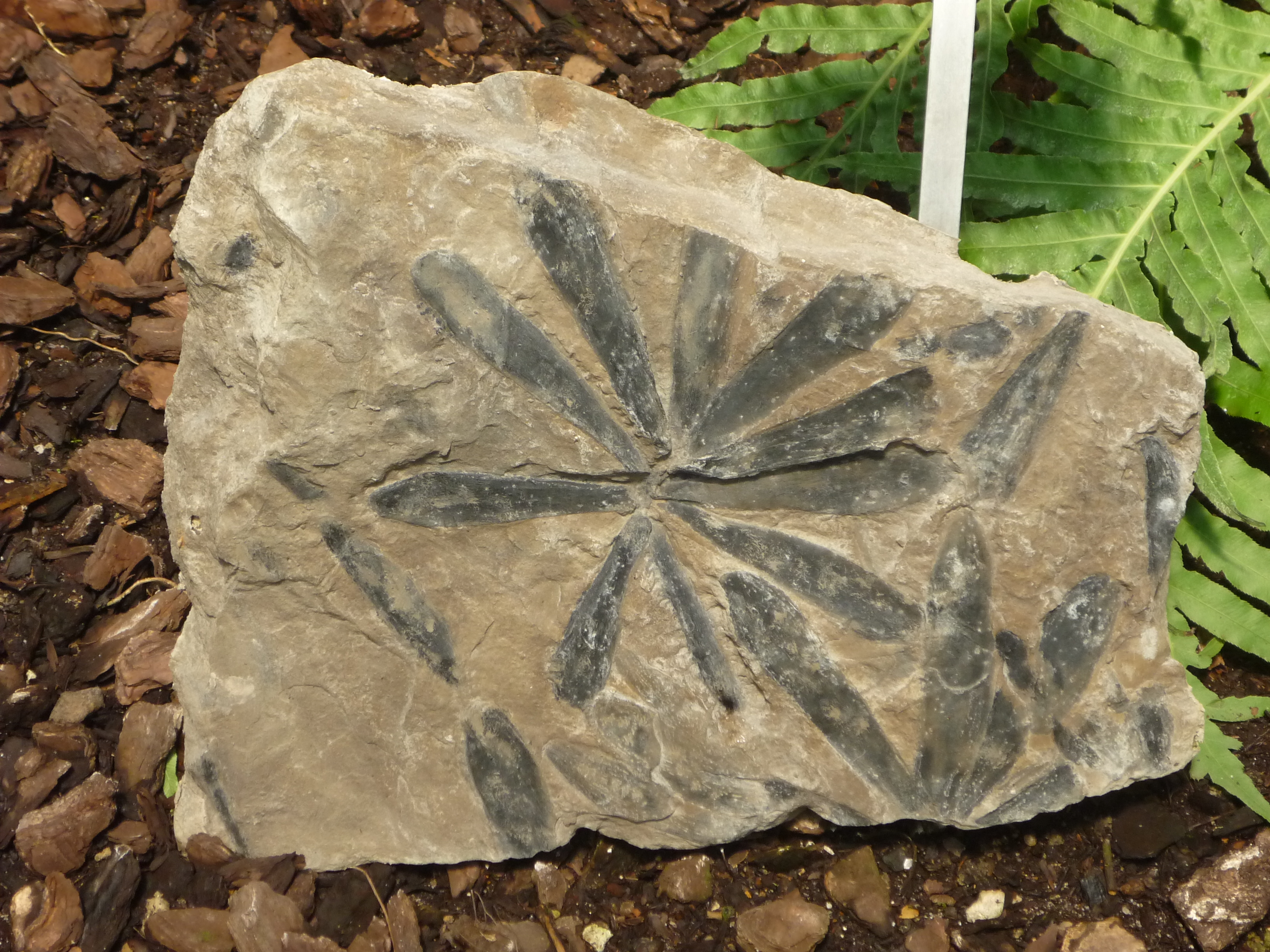
Fossil leaves of Cordaites lungatus

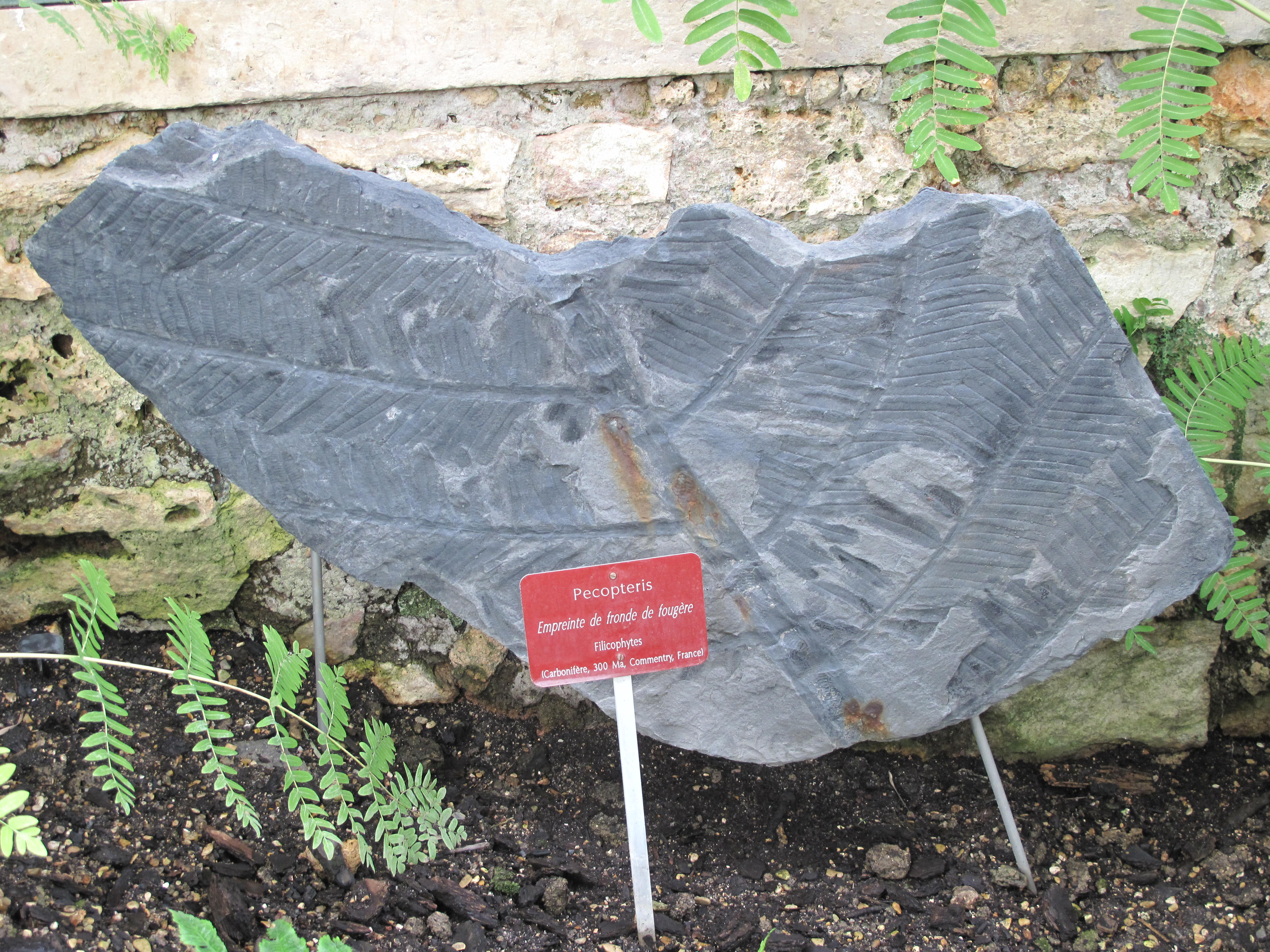
Imprints of the extinct fern Pecopteris from Commentary, France, 300 million years old

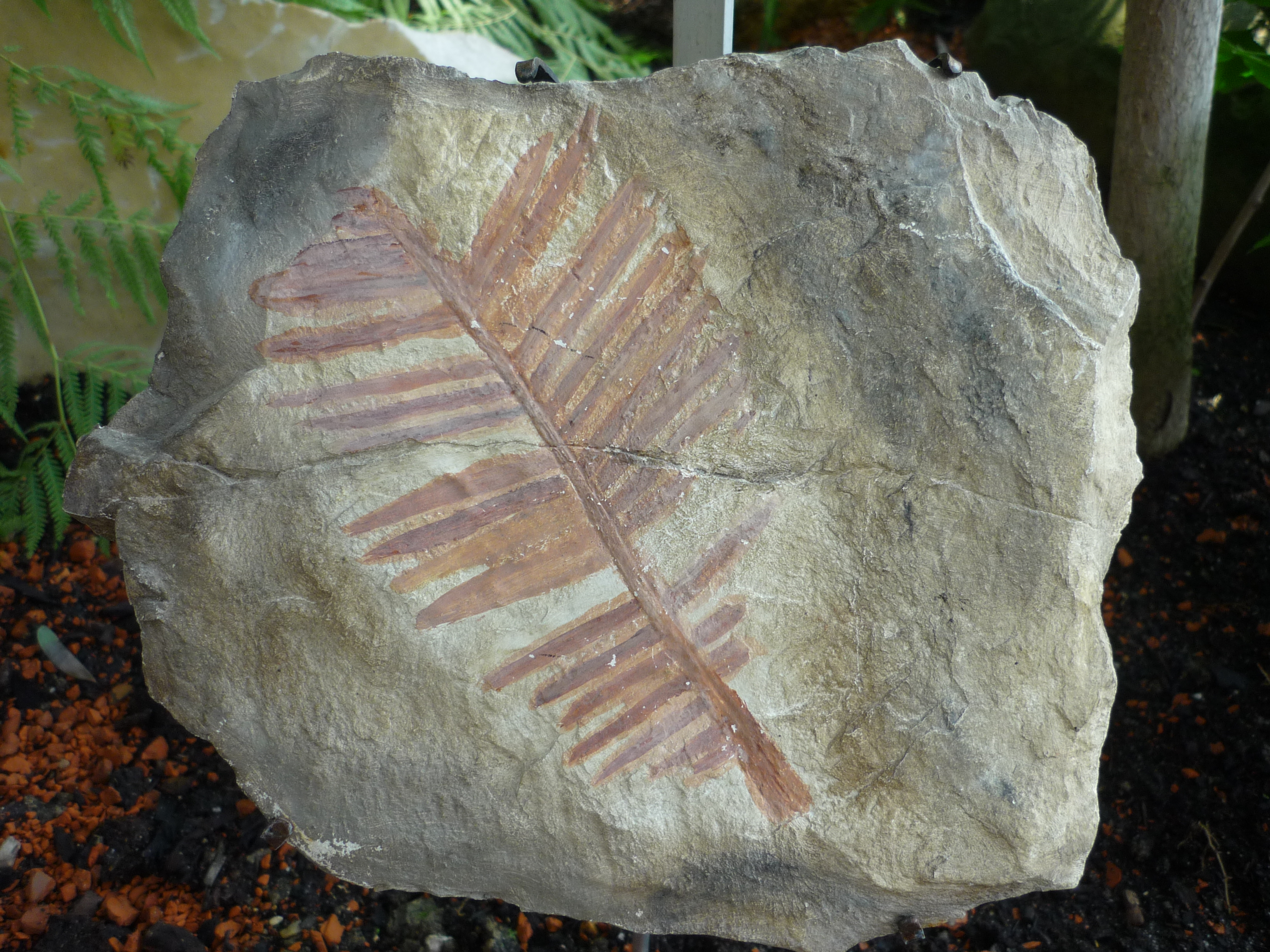
Fossil leaves of Zamites feneonis

The garden has a large collection of fossil plants, collected from around the world. Some of them are displayed in the greenhouses of the garden.

== Other buildings in the gardens ==
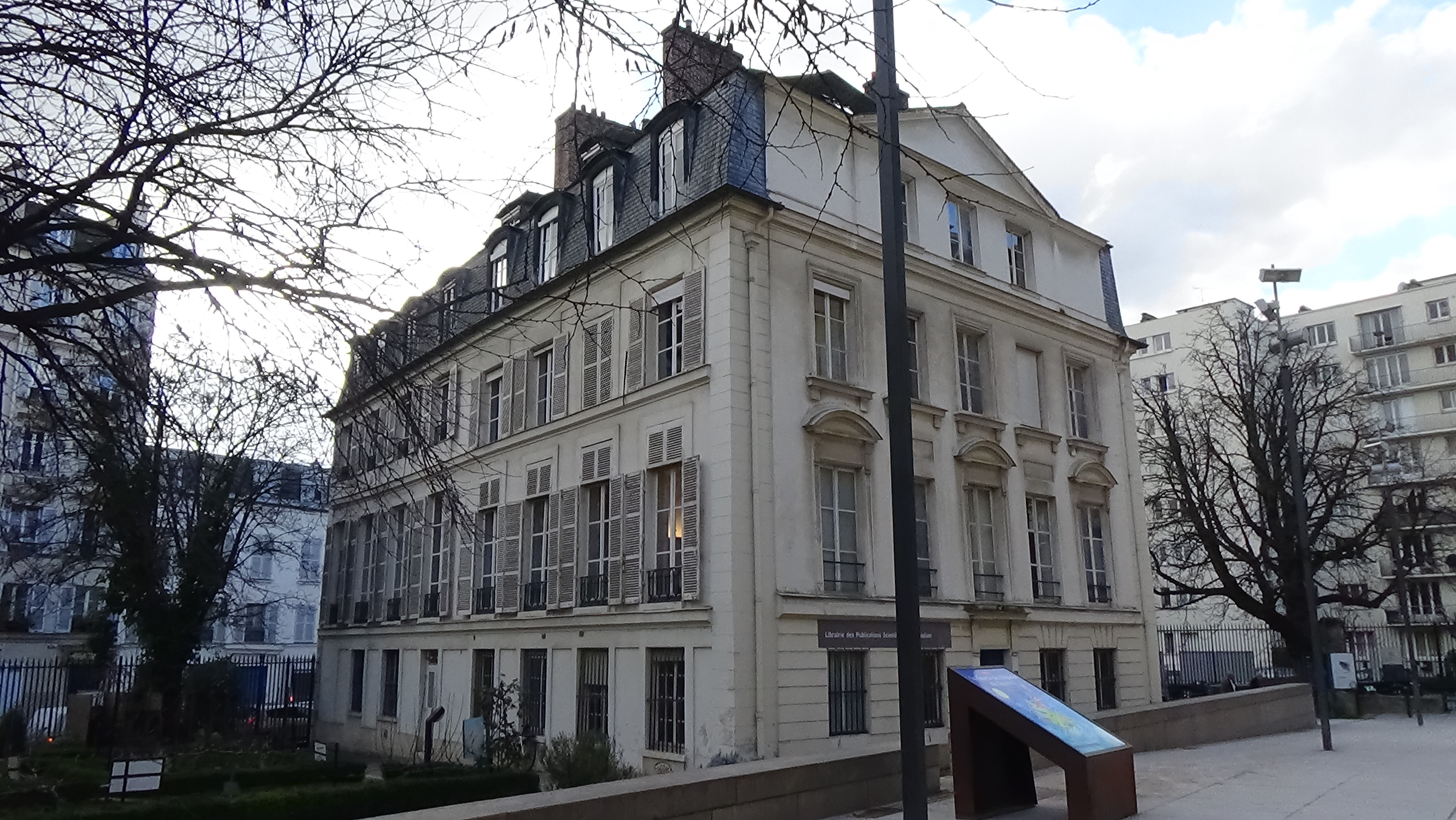
The Maison Buffon, residence of Georges-Louis Leclerc, Comte de Buffon

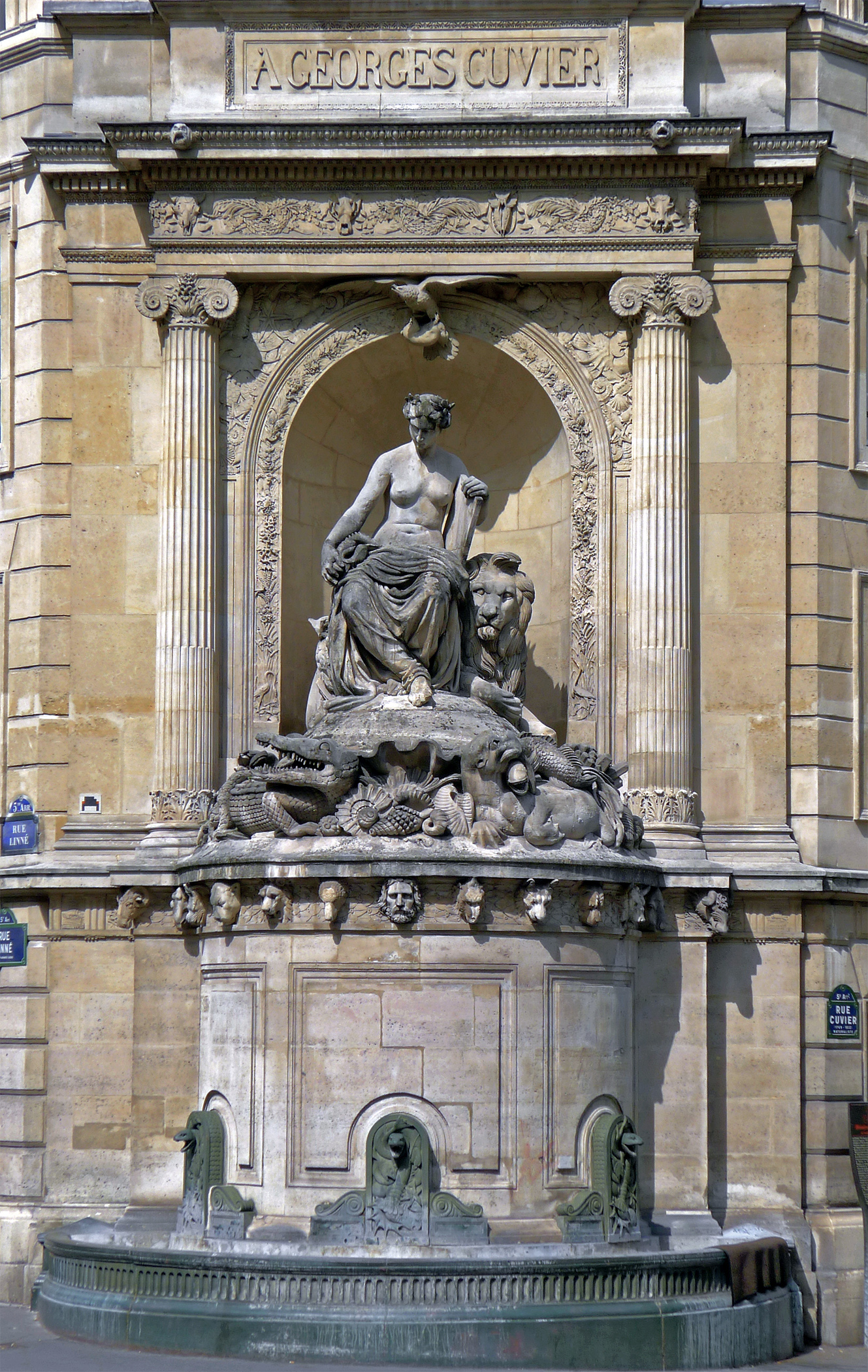
The Cuvier Fountain

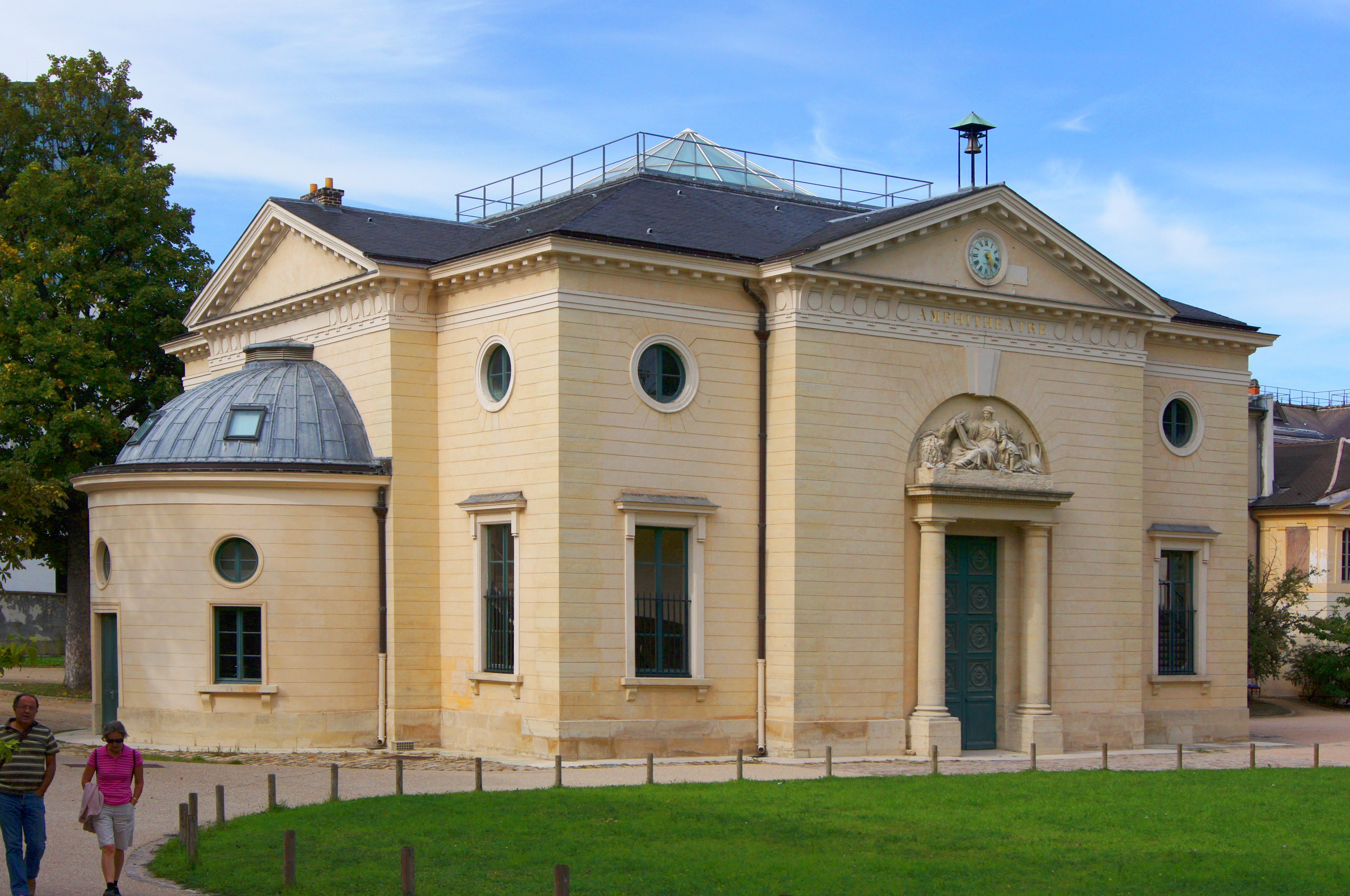
The Amphitheater (18th c.)

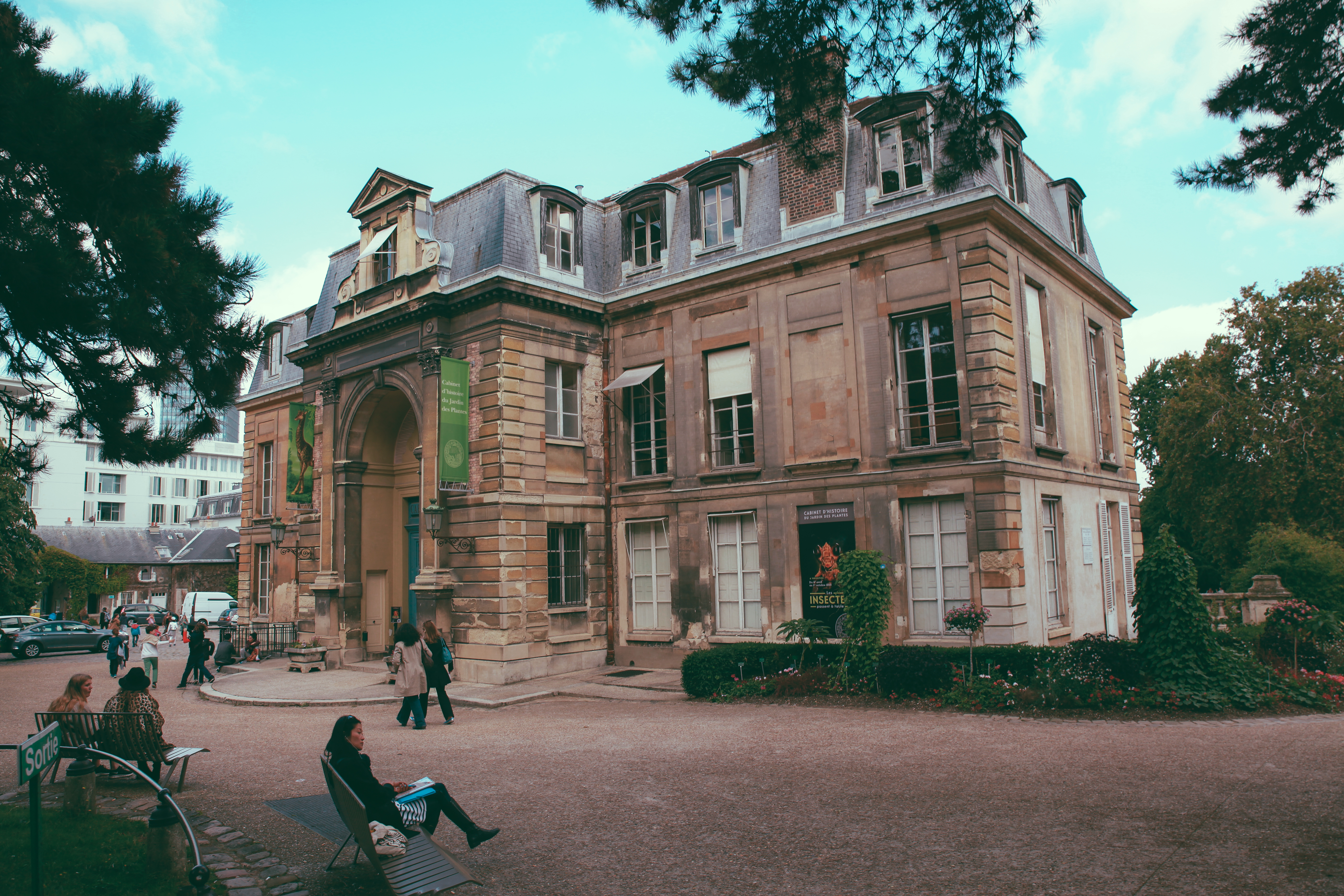
The Hôtel de Magny, the garden administration building
- The Maison de l'Intendance or Maison de Buffon, located the entrance to the garden at 36 Rue Geoffroy-Saint-Hilaire, was the residence of the Georges-Louis Leclerc, Comte de Buffon, the industrialist, naturalist, and director and chief creator of the gardens from 1739 to his death in 1788. It became part of the garden in 1777–1779. (not open to public).
- The Cuvier House, next to the Gallery of Comparative Anatomy, was the residence of the scientist Georges Cuvier until his death in 1832. Cuvier was one of the founders of Paleontology, and the first to identify the skeleton of a mastodon as a prehistoric animal. Its facade displays his motto in Latin "The "Transibunt et augebitur scientia" ("The Hours Pass and science progresses"). The house was also the place where, in 1896, Henri Becquerel carried out the experiment in 1893 which led to the discovery of uranium. This event is marked by plaque on the facade. (not open to public).
- The Cuvier Fountain is across the street from the garden at the intersection of Rue Linné and Rue Cuvier, across the street from the very decorative wrought iron gates of the garden. The fountain honors George Cuvier, considered the father of comparative anatomy, with his statue surrounded by a varied collection of animals. It was built by the park architect Vigoureux and the sculptor Jean-Jacques Feuchère in 1840.
- The Amphitheater near Rue Cuvier in the northwest corner, was constructed in 1787–88 in the garden of the Hôtel de Magny on Rue Cuvier. It was built under the direction of Buffon as a venue for lectures on natural science and the discoveries in the gardens. It was built in a purely neoclassical, or Paladian style. The frontons are decorated with 18th century sculpture depicting the natural sciences. The building was extensively restored in 2002–2003. A large stone vase in front of the amphitheater is a vestige of the Royal Abbey of Saint-Victor, which occupied the site of the amphitheater, and was destroyed during the French Revolution.
- The Pavilion of New Converts, in the northwest corner of the garden on the Allée Chevreul, is a vestige of the Convent of New Converts, founded in 1622 by Father Hyacinth of Paris and moved to the site in 1656. It was built to shelter Protestant converts to Catholicism. The surviving north facade, with a fronton in the Louis XIV style, contained the refectory, a parlour and bedrooms. After the French Revolution it became part of the gardens. It was the residence and laboratory of a director of the museum for 28 years, the chemist Eugene Chevreul, who died there in 1899 at the age of 103. Chevreul developed the use of color wheels or chromatic circles to resolve the definition of colors. His theory of colors was used at the Gobelins Manufactory of tapestries, where his laboratory was located, and inspired the palette of colors used by Eugène Delacroix. A statue of Chevreul is placed in the Carré Chevreul in the gardens.
- The Hôtel de Magny at 57 Rue Cuvier is the administration building of the gardens. It was built in about 1700 under Louis XIV as a residence, designed by the royal architect Pierre Bullet, whose works included the Porte Saint-Martin and mansions in Le Marais and Place Vendôme After the Revolution, it turned into a boarding school; the celebrated actor Talma was one of the students. The house and estates were purchased, by Buffon in 1787 to enlarge the gardens (not open to the public). In front of the building is Amazone (1927), a bronze work by French sculptor Pierre Vigoureux.

== Gardens and sites associated with the Jardin des Plantes ==
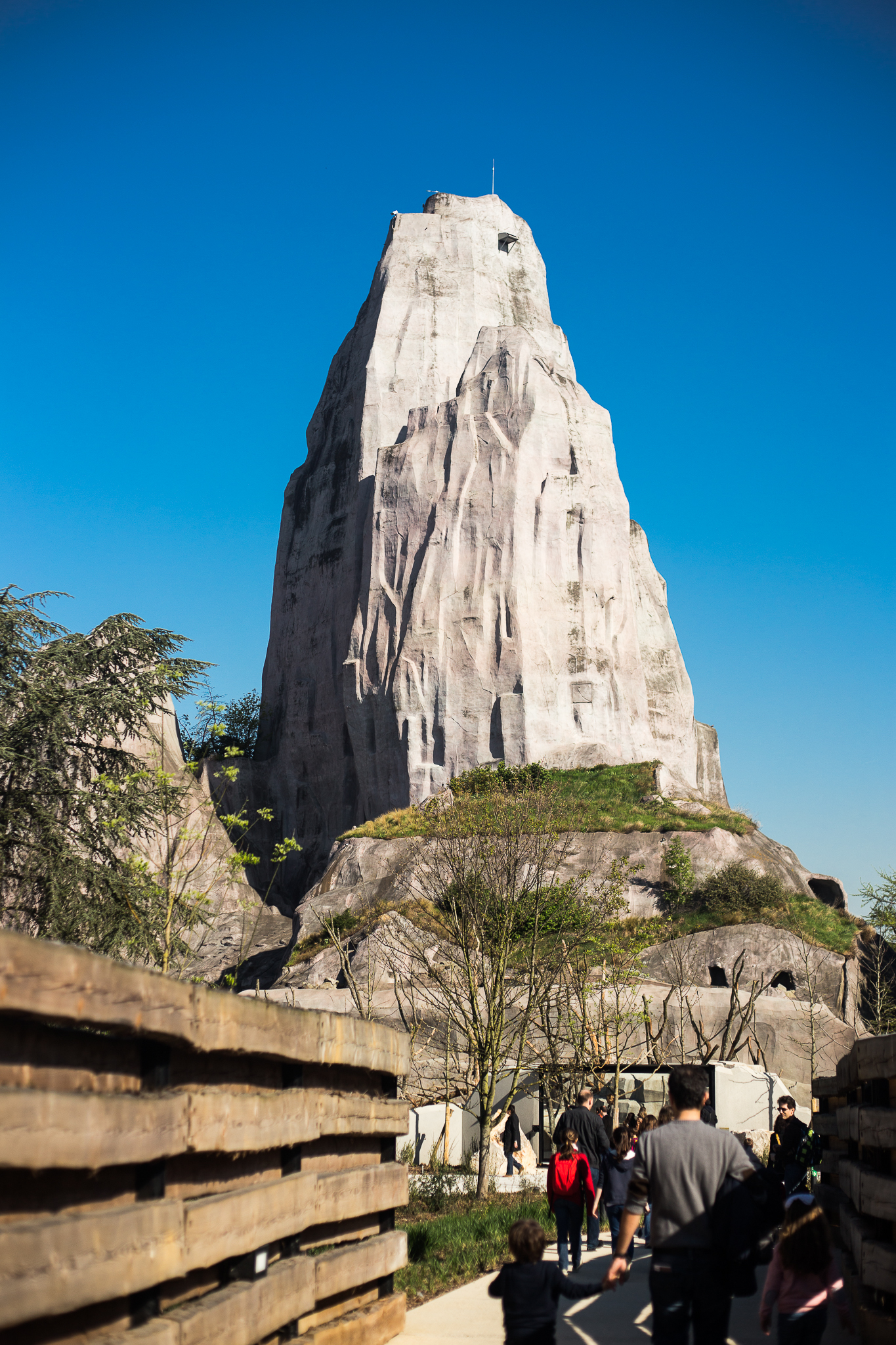
Artificial mountain in the Paris Zoological Park

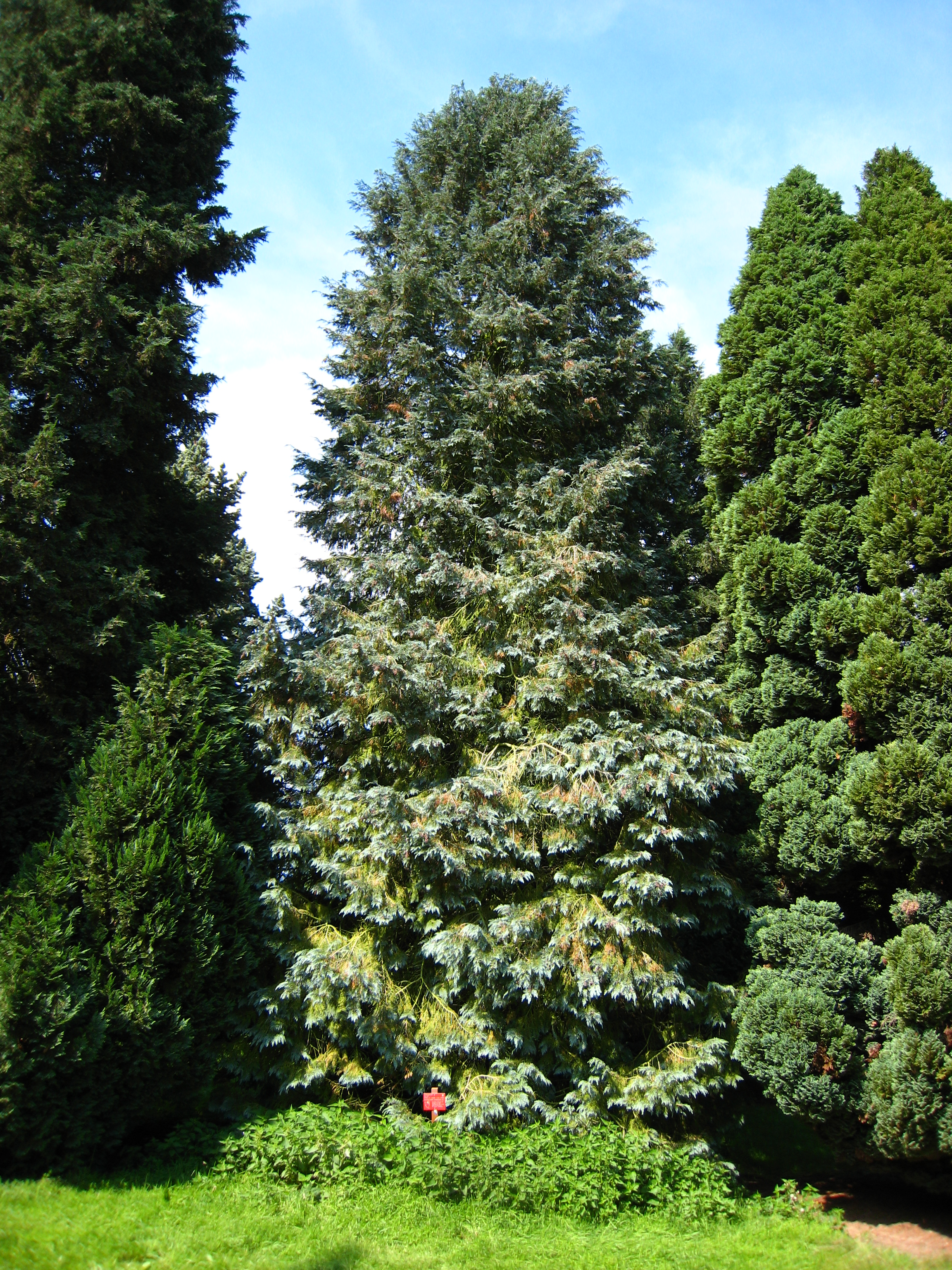
Chamaecyparis lawsoniana tree in the Arboretum de Chèvreloup

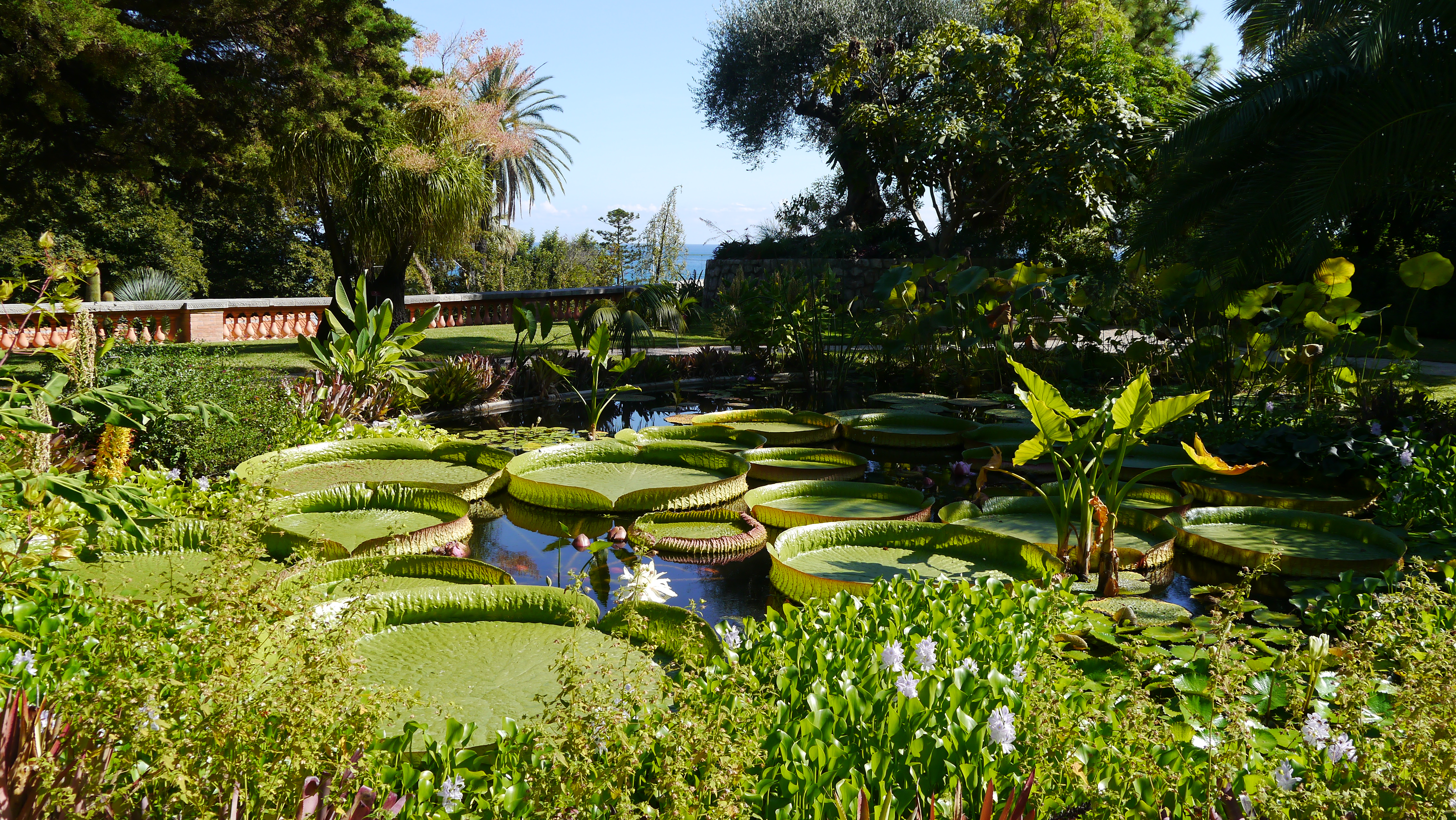
View of the Jardin botanique exotique de Menton

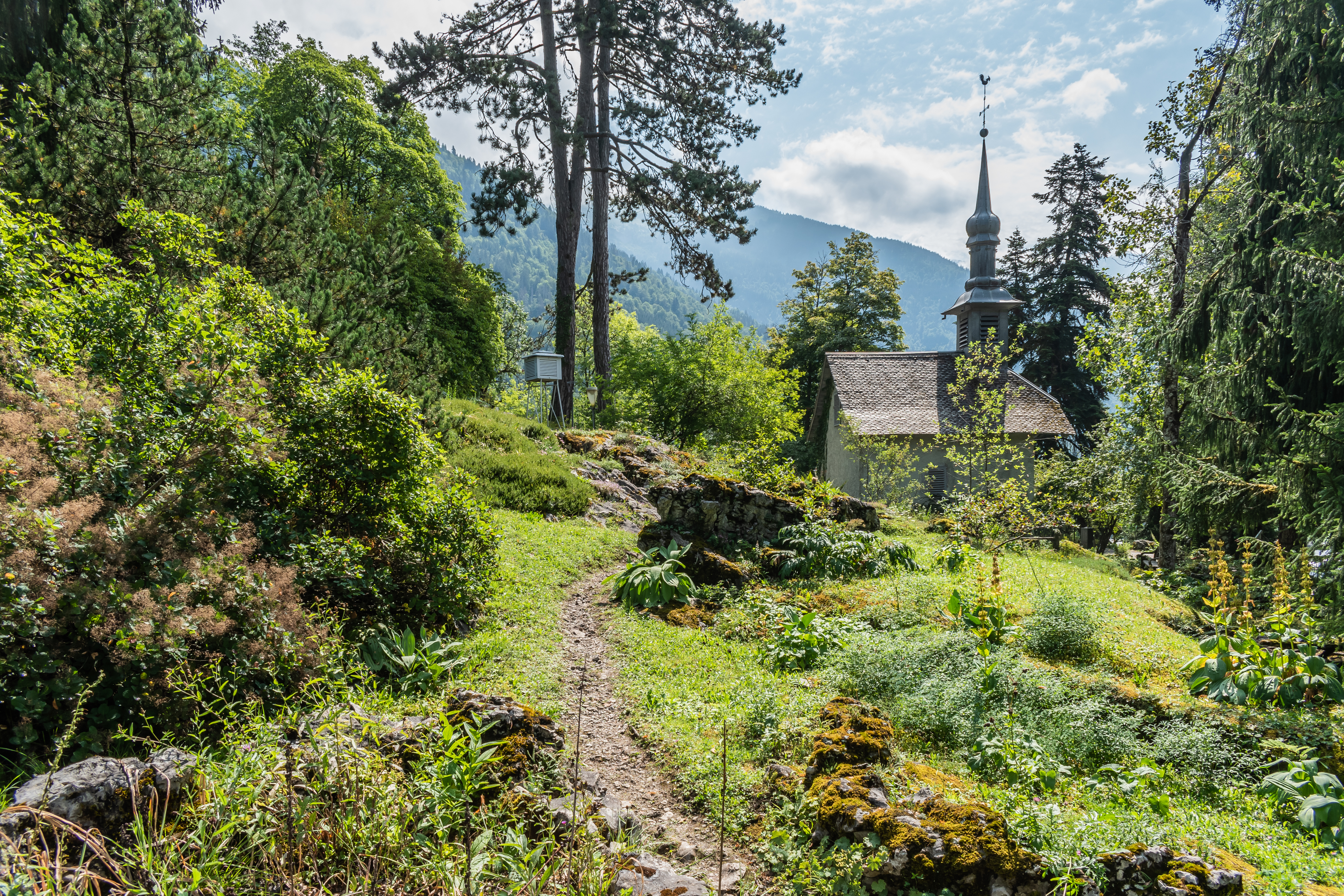
Alpine Garden of Jaysinia in Haut-Savoie
- The Paris Zoological Park was created in 1934 in the Bois de Vincennes, as space in menagerie of the Jardin des Plantes became scarce. It is administered, like the Jardin des Plantes, by the Museum of Natural History. New environments were created there for the larger mammals, including the giraffes, elephants, and hippopotamus. The new zoo covers 14.5 hectares (36 acres). The centrepiece is a large artificial rock, 65 meters (213 feet) high. It also includes a large greenhouse with 4,000 square meters (43,000 square feet) of plantations, simulating a tropical rain forest.
- The Parc des Clères in the Normandy specialises in birds and certain quadrupeds, including kangaroos and cervids.
- The Arboretum de Chèvreloup, located near Versailles was founded in 1927. It covers 222 hectares, and has species raised from seeds collected from botanical gardens around the world. it focuses particularly upon
- The Jardin botanique exotique de Menton, is located near Menton in the Alpes-Maritimes province. It specialises in tropical plants and those from the Mediterranean climate.
- The Animal Park of la Haute Touche, between Sologne and Berry, specialises in reproducing endangered species in a large natural setting.
- The Alpine Garden of Jaysinia at Samoëns in Haut-Savoie specialises in high-altitude plants from around the world, particularly from the Alps.

== Access ==
Located near the Metro stations: Quai de la Rapée, Jussieu, Place Monge and Gare d'Austerlitz.

== See also ==
- List of botanical gardens in France
- Friends of the Natural History Museum Paris

== Bibliography ==
In French

- Deligorges, Stephan; Gady, Alexandre; Labalette, Françoise (2004). Le Jardin des plantes et le Muséum national d'histoire naturalle. Éditions du Patrimoine – Centre des Monuments Nationaux. ISBN 978-2-85822-601-6.
