= National Museum of Natural History, France =

Museum in Paris, France

National Museum of Natural History
- Muséum national d'histoire naturelle
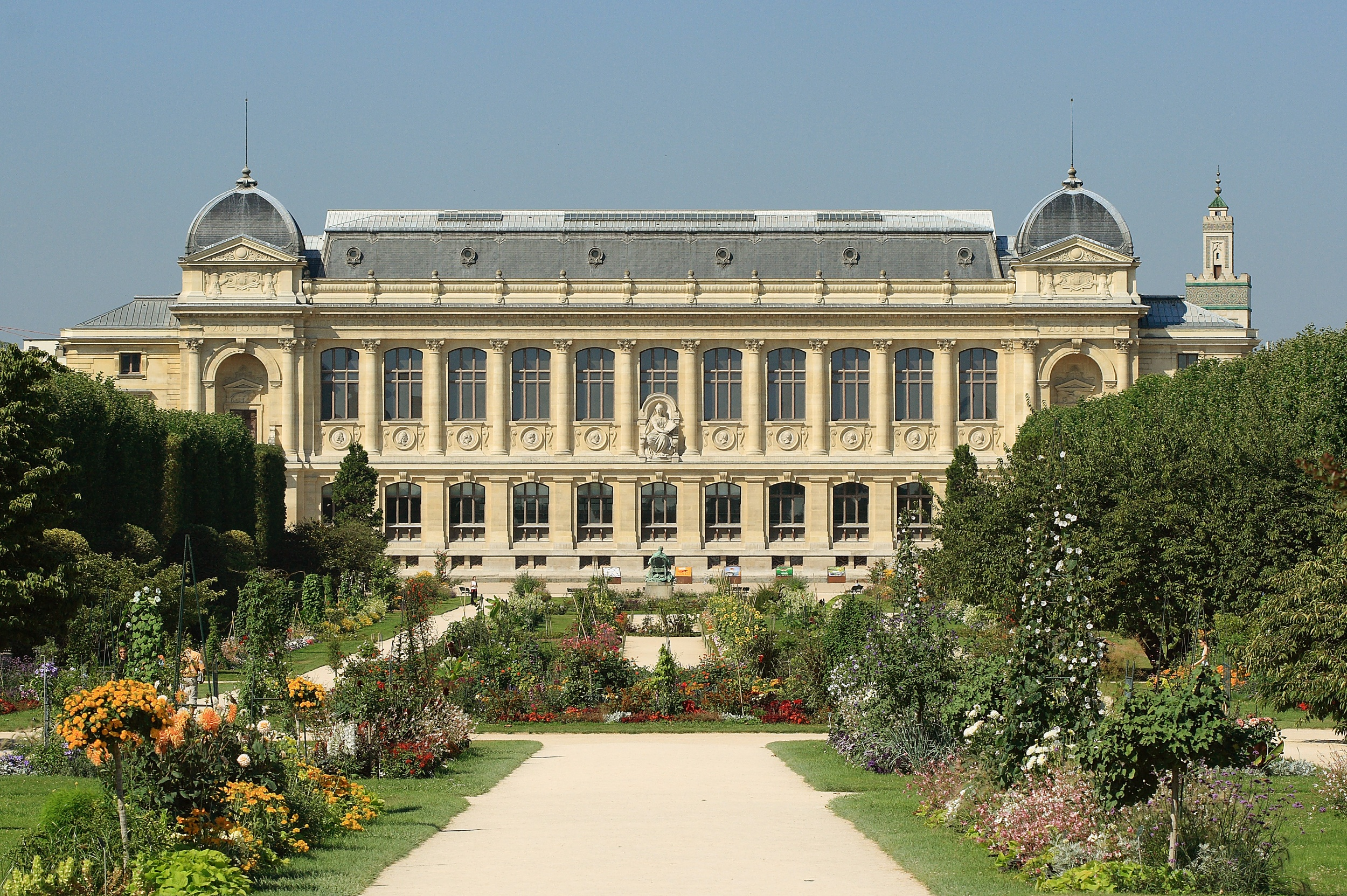
- Grand Gallery of Evolution of the National Museum of Natural History

- Location within Paris
- Established: June 10, 1793; 233 years ago
- Location: 57 Rue Cuvier, Paris, France
- Coordinates: 48°50′32″N 02°21′22″E
- Type: Natural history museum, part of Sorbonne University
- Collection size: 67 million specimens
- Visitors: 3.8 million in FY-2024
- Director: Gilles Bloch
- Public transit access: Jussieu; Place Monge; Austerlitz
- Website: mnhn.fr

Muséum national d'histoire naturelle network
- Muséum national d'histoire naturelle; Jardin des Plantes; Musée de l'Homme; Ménagerie du Jardin des Plantes; Brunoy Ecology Research Centre; Chèvreloup Arboretum; Jardin botanique exotique de Menton; Marinarium Concarneau Marine Biology Station; Paris Zoological Park (Vincennes Zoo); Cleres Zoological Park; Research and Education Centre on Coastal Systems; Haute Touche Zoological Park; Jaysinia Alpine Garden; Abri Pataud Prehistoric Museum; L’Harmas de Fabre

In France, the National Museum of Natural History (French: Muséum national d'histoire naturelle [myzeɔm nɑsjɔnal distwaʁ natyʁɛl]; MNHN) is the national natural history museum of France and a grand établissement of higher education part of Sorbonne University. The main museum, with four galleries, is located in Paris, France, within the Jardin des Plantes on the left bank of the River Seine. It was formally founded in 1793, during the French Revolution, but was begun even earlier in 1635 as the royal garden of medicinal plants. The MNHN now has 14 sites throughout France.

Since the 2014 reform, it has been headed by a chairman, assisted by deputy managing directors. The Museum has a staff of approximately 2,350 members, including six hundred researchers. It is a member of the national network of naturalist collections (RECOLNAT).

== History ==
=== 17th–18th century ===
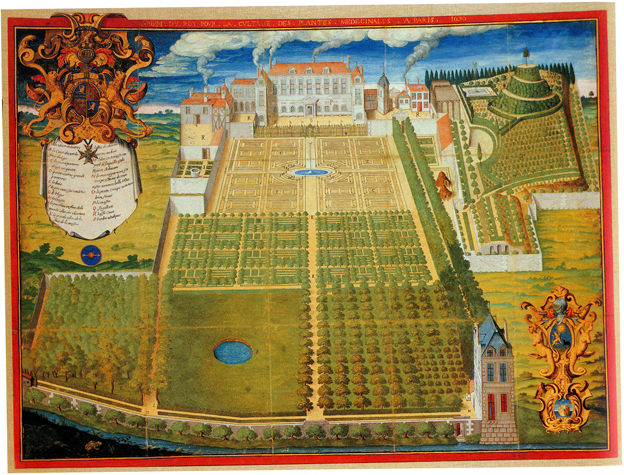
The Royal Garden of Medicinal Plants in 1636

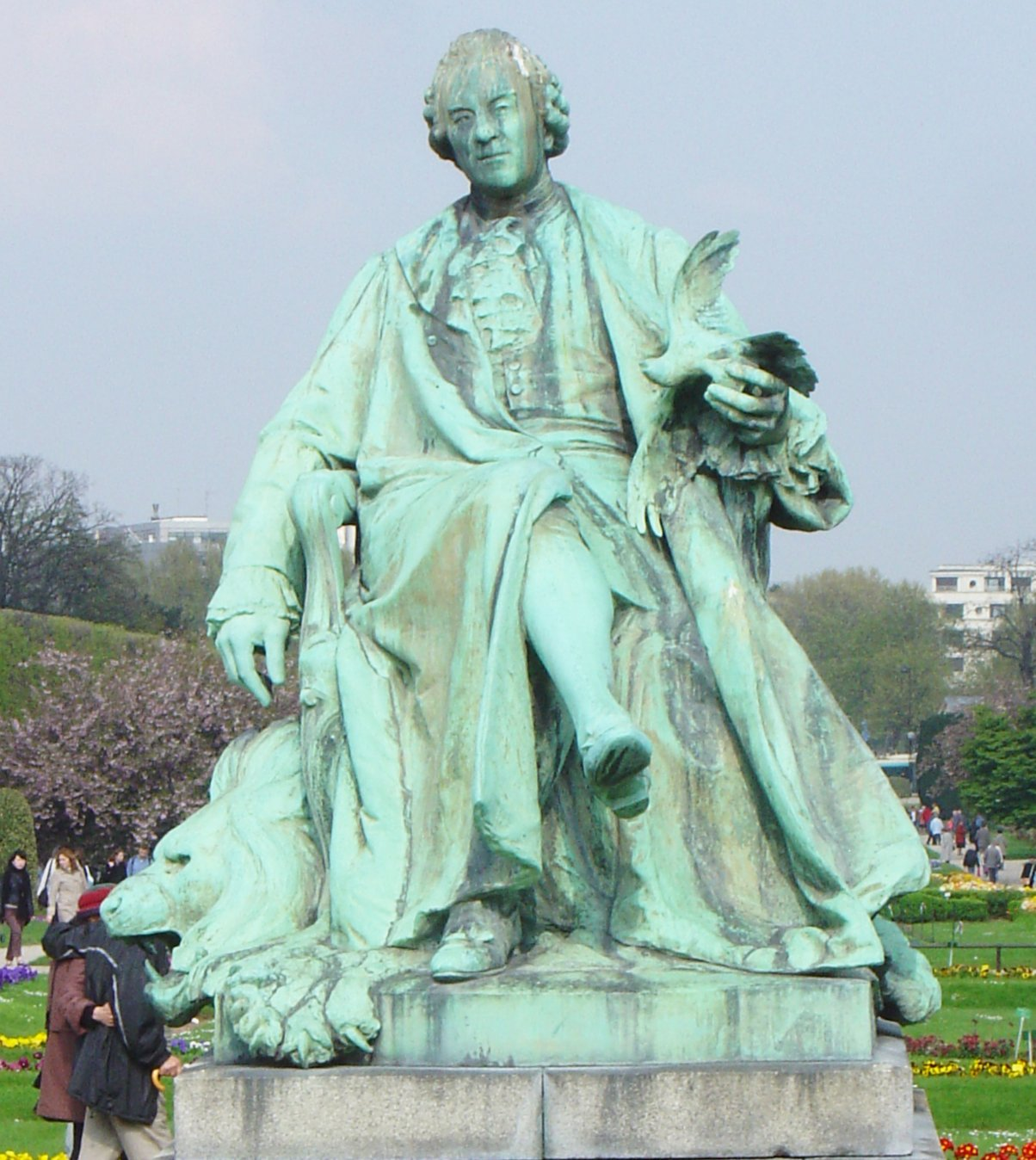
Statue of Georges-Louis Leclerc, Comte de Buffon in the formal garden

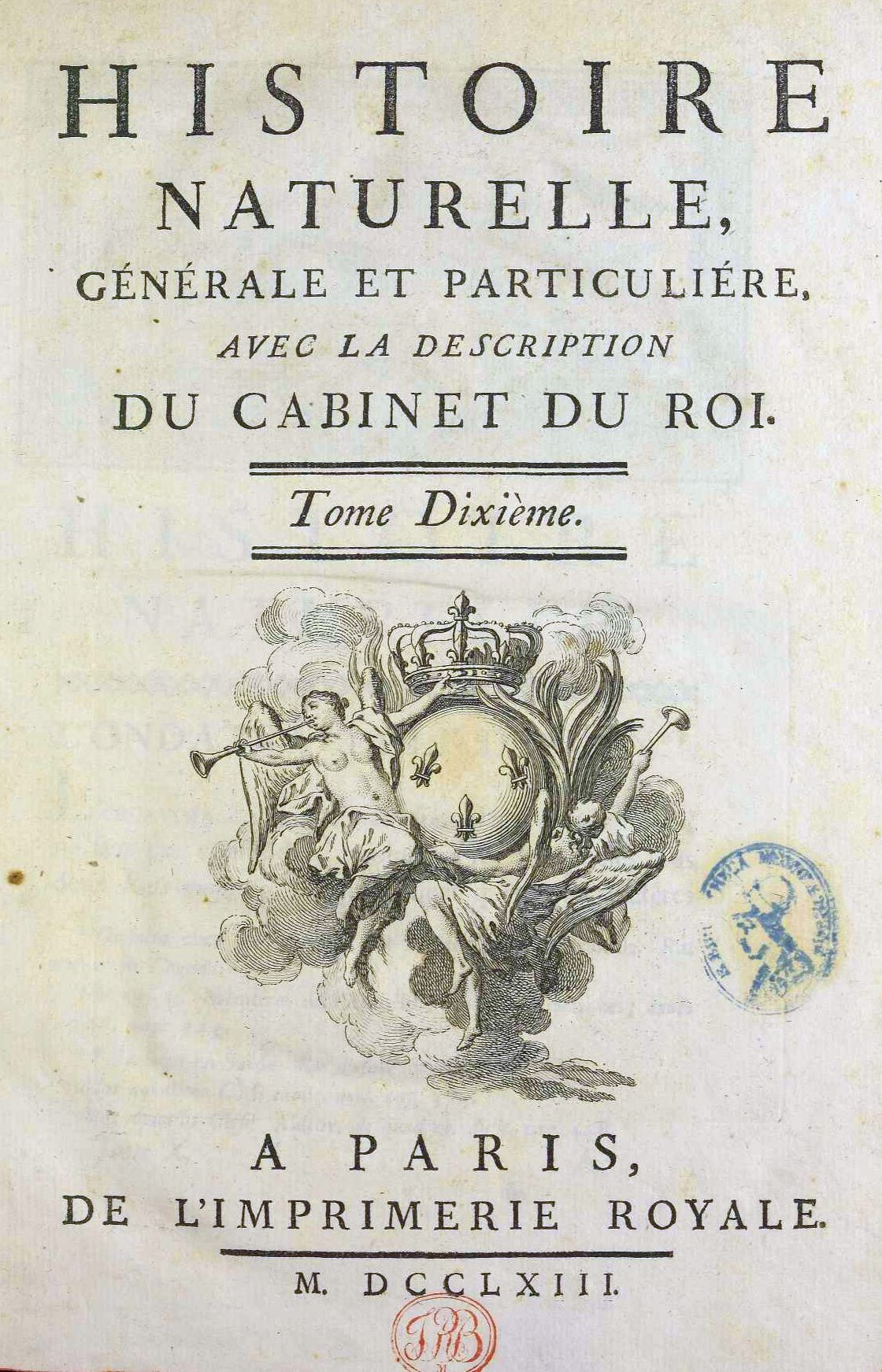
Buffon's "Natural History" (1763)

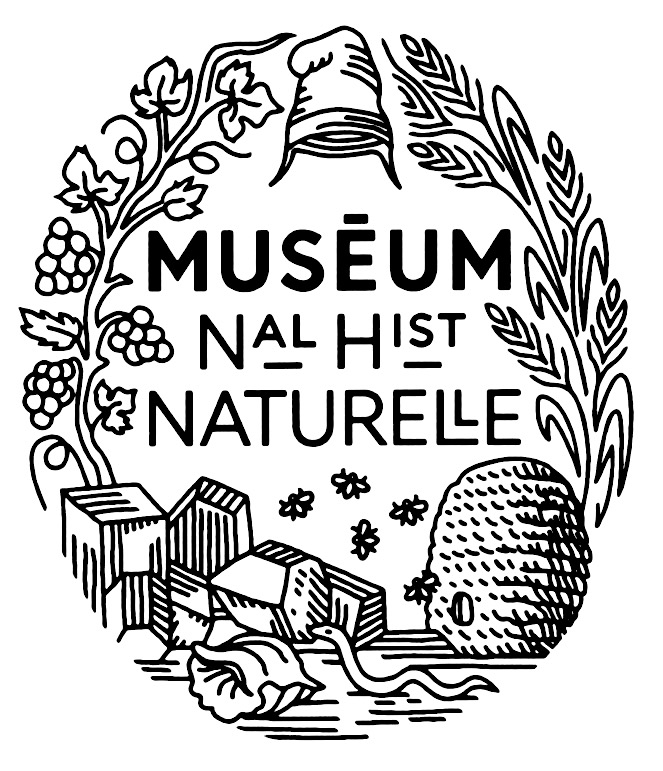
The MNHN's seal, designed in 1793, illustrates the three realms of Nature, Collective work, and the French Revolution.

The MNHN was formally established on June 10, 1793, by the French Convention, the government during the French Revolution, at the same time that it established the Louvre Museum. But its origins went back much further, to the Royal Garden of Medicinal Plants, which was created by King Louis XIII in 1635, and was directed and run by the royal physicians. A royal proclamation of the boy-king Louis XV on 31 March 1718, removed the purely medical function. Besides growing and studying plants useful for health, the royal garden offered public lectures on botany, chemistry, and comparative anatomy. In 1729, the chateau in the garden was enlarged with an upper floor, and transformed into the cabinet of natural history, designed for the royal collections of zoology and mineralogy. A series of greenhouses were constructed on the west side of the garden, to study the plants and animals collected by French explorers for their for medical and commercial uses.

From 1739 until 1788, the garden was under the direction of Georges-Louis Leclerc, Comte de Buffon, one of the leading naturalists of the Enlightenment. Though he did not go on scientific expeditions himself, he wrote a monumental and influential work, "Natural History", in thirty-six volumes, published between 1749 and 1788. In his books, he challenged the traditional religious ideas that nature had not changed since the creation; he suggested that the earth was seventy-five thousand years old, divided into seven periods, with man arriving in the most recent. He also helped fund much research, through the iron foundry which he owned and directed. His statue is prominently placed in front of the Gallery of Evolution.

Following the French Revolution the MNHN was reorganised, with twelve professorships of equal rank. Some of its early professors included eminent comparative anatomist Georges Cuvier and the pioneers of the theory of evolution, Jean-Baptiste de Lamarck and Étienne Geoffroy Saint-Hilaire. The museum's aims were to instruct the public, put together collections and conduct scientific research. The naturalist Louis Jean Marie Daubenton wrote extensively about biology for the pioneer French Encyclopédie, and gave his name to several newly discovered species. The museum sent its trained botanists on scientific expeditions around the world. Major figures in the MNHN included Déodat de Dolomieu, who gave his name to the mineral dolomite and to a volcano on Réunion island, and the botanist Rene Desfontaines, who spent two years collecting plants for study Tunisia and Algeria, and whose book "Flora Atlantica" (1798–1799, 2 vols), added three hundred genera new to science.

When Napoleon Bonaparte launched his military campaign to conquer Egypt in 1798, his army was accompanied by more than 154 scientists, including botanists, chemists, mineralogists, including Étienne Geoffroy Saint-Hilaire, Vivant Denon, Joseph Fourier, and Claude Louis Berthollet, who together took back a large quantity of specimens and illustrations to enrich the collections of the museum.

=== 19th century ===
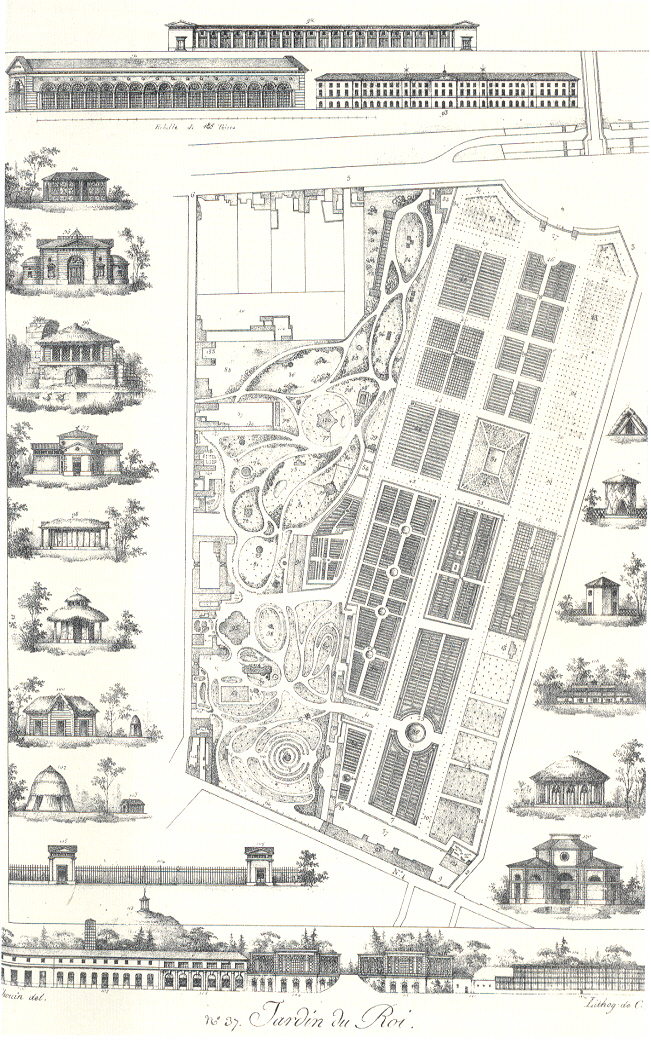
Plan of the Jardin des Plantes and its buildings in 1820

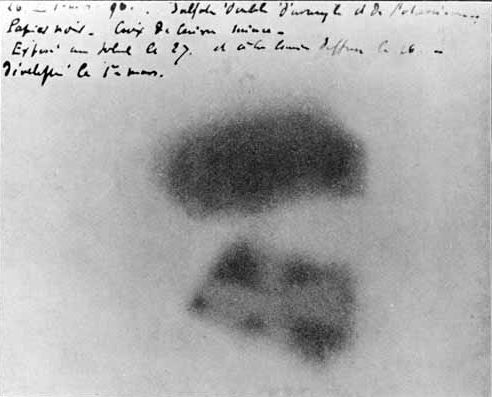
The photographic plate of Henri Becquerel, the first documented evidence of the radioactivity of uranium (1896)

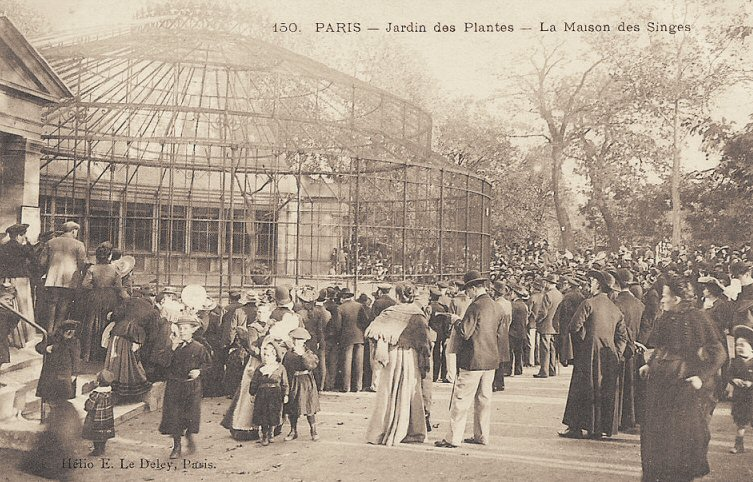
Crowd outside the Palace of the Apes (c. 1900) in the Jardin des Plantes

The MNHN continued to flourish during the 19th century, particularly under the direction of chemist Michel Eugène Chevreul, His research with animal fats revolutionised the manufacture of soap and of candles and led to his isolation of the heptadecanoic (margaric), stearic, and oleic fatty acids. In the medical field, he was first to demonstrate that diabetics excrete glucose. and to isolate creatine. His theories of colour "provided the scientific basis for Impressionist and Neo-Impressionist painting."

Henri Becquerel held the chair for Applied Physics at the MNHN (1892–1908). By wrapping uranium salts in photographic paper, he first demonstrated the radioactive properties of uranium. In 1903, he shared the Nobel Prize in Physics with Pierre Curie and Marie Curie for the discovery of spontaneous radioactivity. Four generations of Becquerels held this chairmanship, from 1838 to 1948.

As its collections grew, the MNHN was enlarged, with the construction of a new gallery of zoology. it was begun in 1877 and completed in 1889, for the 100th anniversary of the French Revolution. A new Gallery of Palaeontology and Comparative Anatomy was opened in 1898. The cost of construction drained the museum budget and it began to run short of funds. Its emphasis on teaching brought it into conflict with the University of Paris, which had better political connections. It gradually scaled back its program of teaching and focused primarily on research and the museum collections.

=== 20th–21st century ===
After receiving greater financial autonomy in 1907, it began a new phase of growth. In 1934, the MNHN opened the Paris Zoological Park, a new zoo to in the Bois de Vincennes, as the home for the larger animals of the Menagerie of the Jardin des Plantes. In 1937, it opens the Musée de l'Homme, a museum of anthropology located in Palais de Chaillot, across the Seine from the Eiffel Tower, in a building created for the 1937 Paris International Exposition. In recent decades, it has directed its research and education efforts at the effects on the environment of human exploitation. In French public administration, the museum is classed as a grand établissement of higher education.

Some of the buildings, particularly the Grand Gallery of Evolution, completed in 1889, were in poor condition by the mid-20th century. It was closed entirely in 1965, then underwent major restoration between 1991 and 1994 to its present state.

In August 2025, the MNHN returned the skull of the Malagasy King Toera of Menabe, who was killed by French colonial soldiers in 1897, to Madagascar along with the skulls of two of his companions after more than a century of keeping the skulls in its archives.

On 16 September 2025, multiple gold artefacts valued at €600,000 were stolen following a heist at the MNHN. A suspect was charged on 21 October 2025 in connection with the heist.

== Plan ==
Plan showing galleries of the National Museum of Natural History, within the Jardin des Plantes Paris

== Galleries and gardens ==
The birthplace of the MNHN and a large part of its modern collections are found in five galleries in the Jardin des Plantes. These are the Gallery of Evolution; the Gallery of Mineralogy and Geology; the Gallery of Botany; the Gallery of Palaeontology and Comparative Anatomy, and the Laboratory of Entomology.

=== The Grand Gallery of Evolution ===
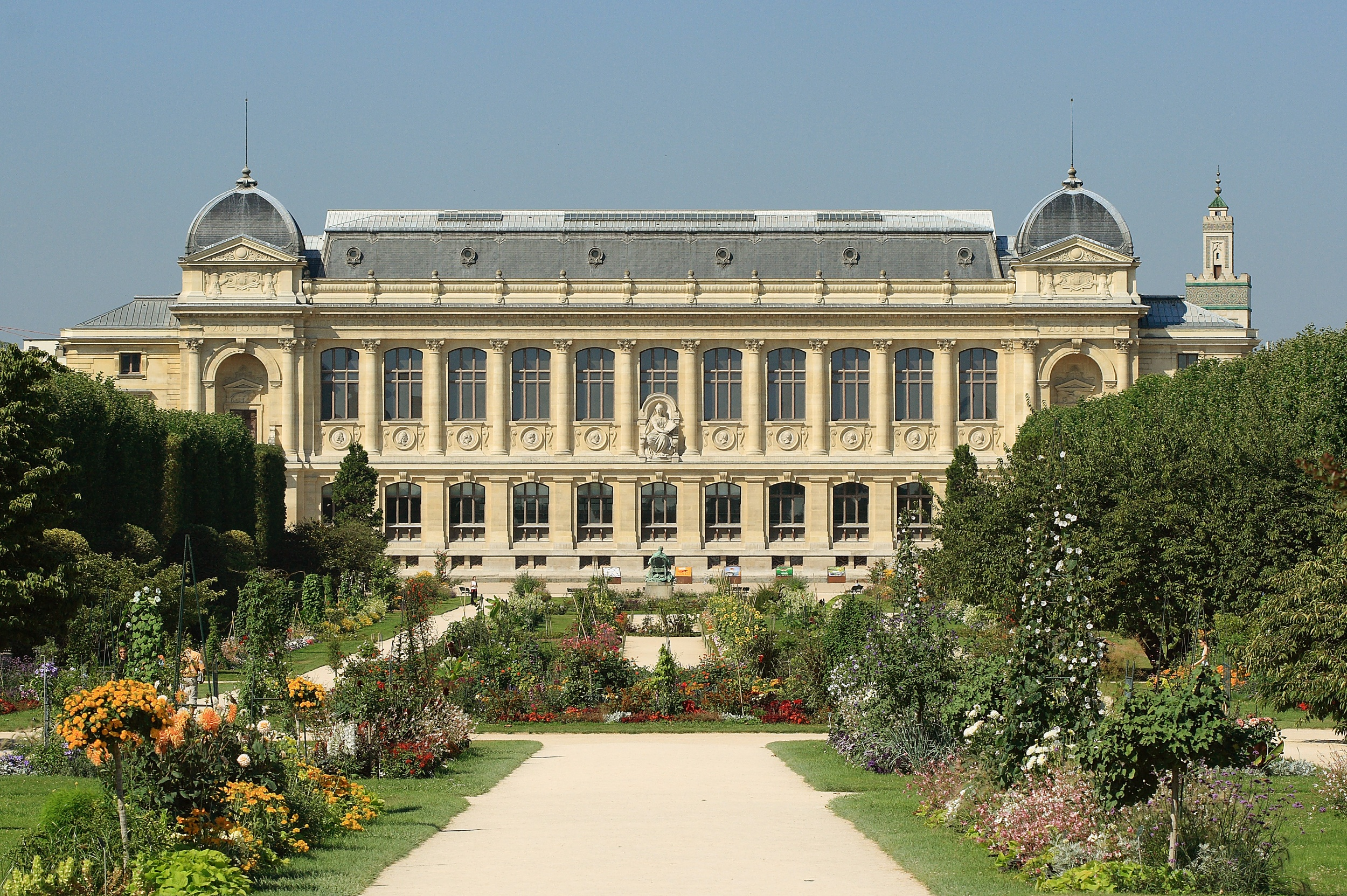
Garden facade of the Grand Gallery of Evolution

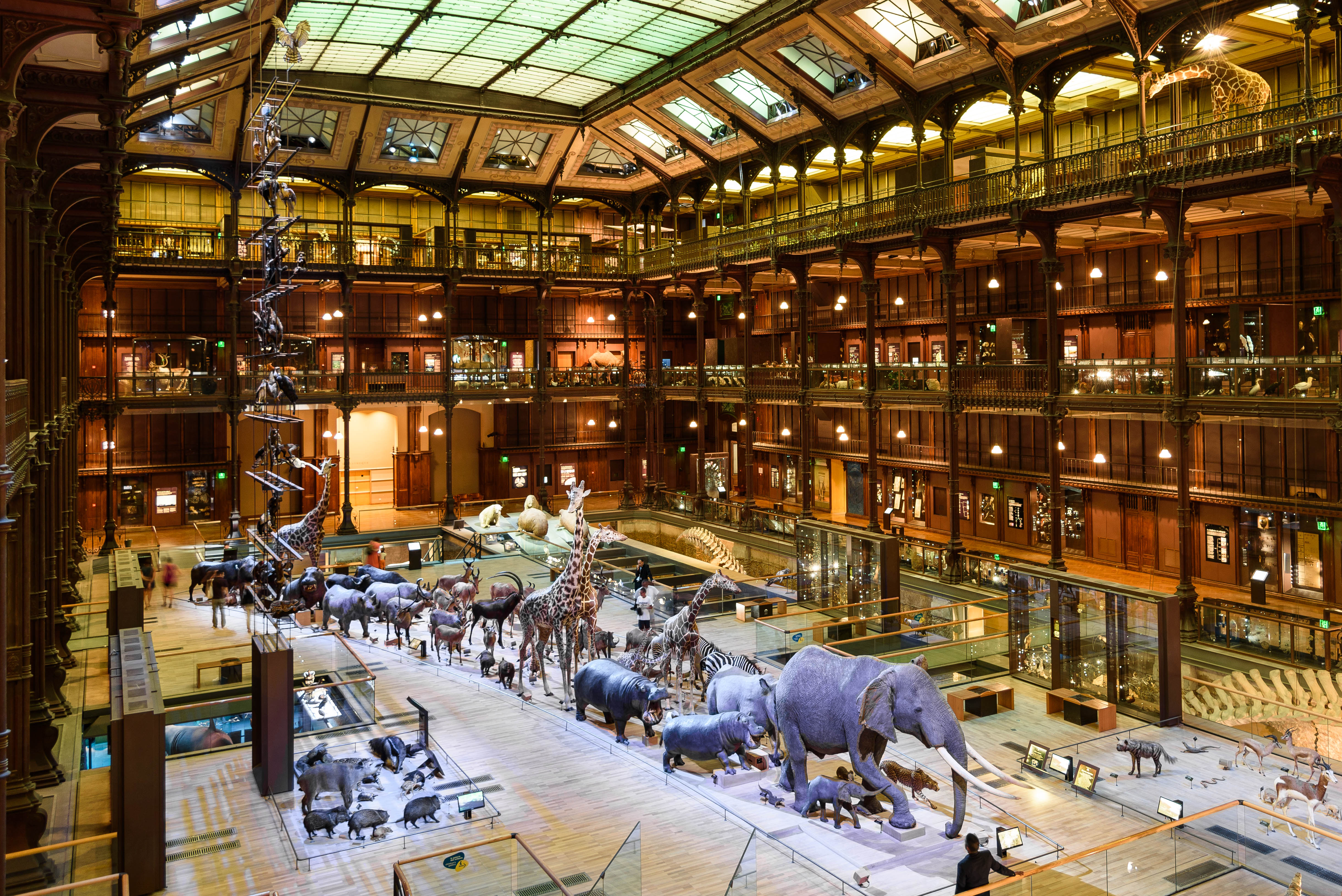
Interior of the Grand Gallery of Evolution

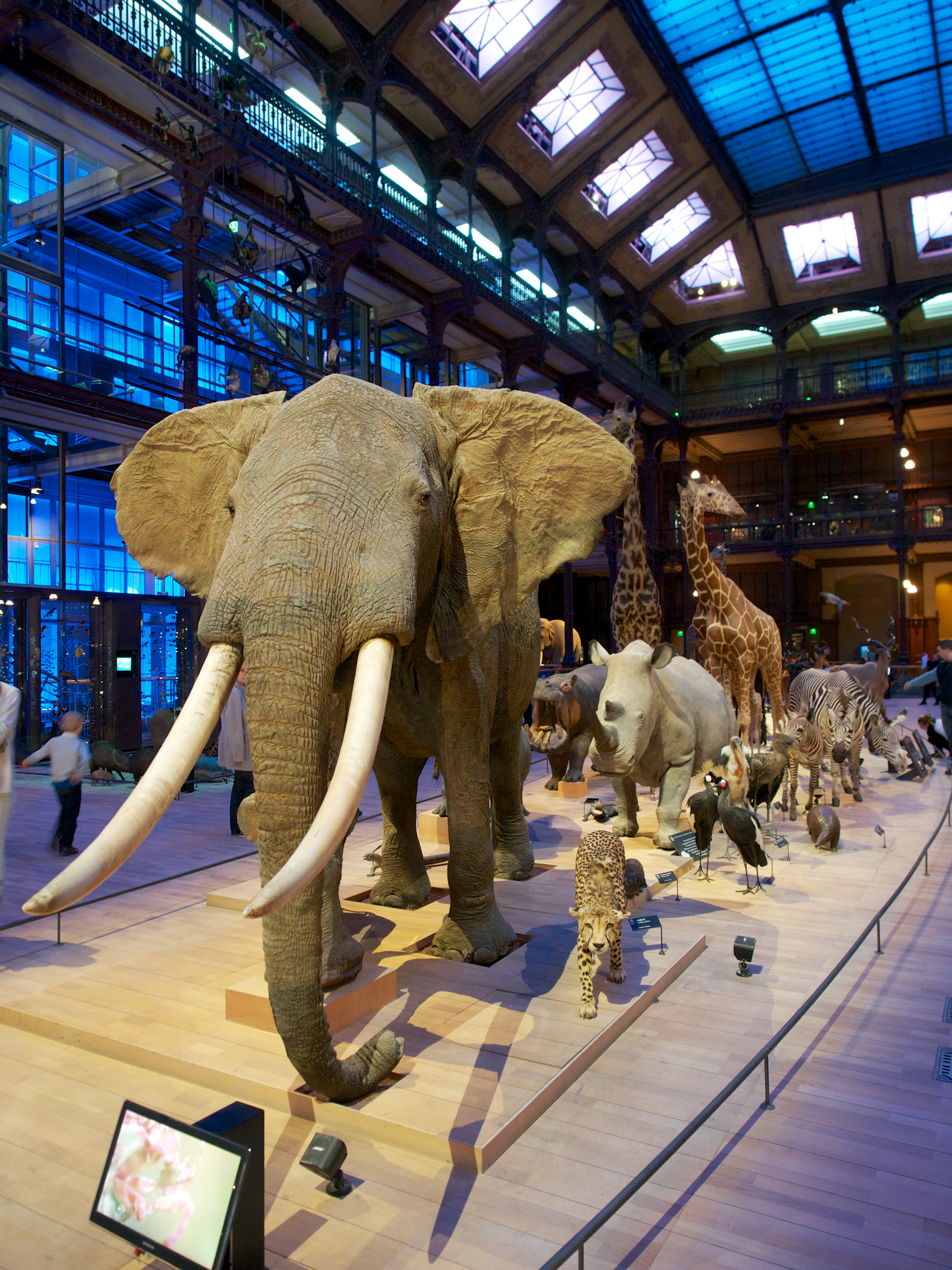
Parade of African mammals

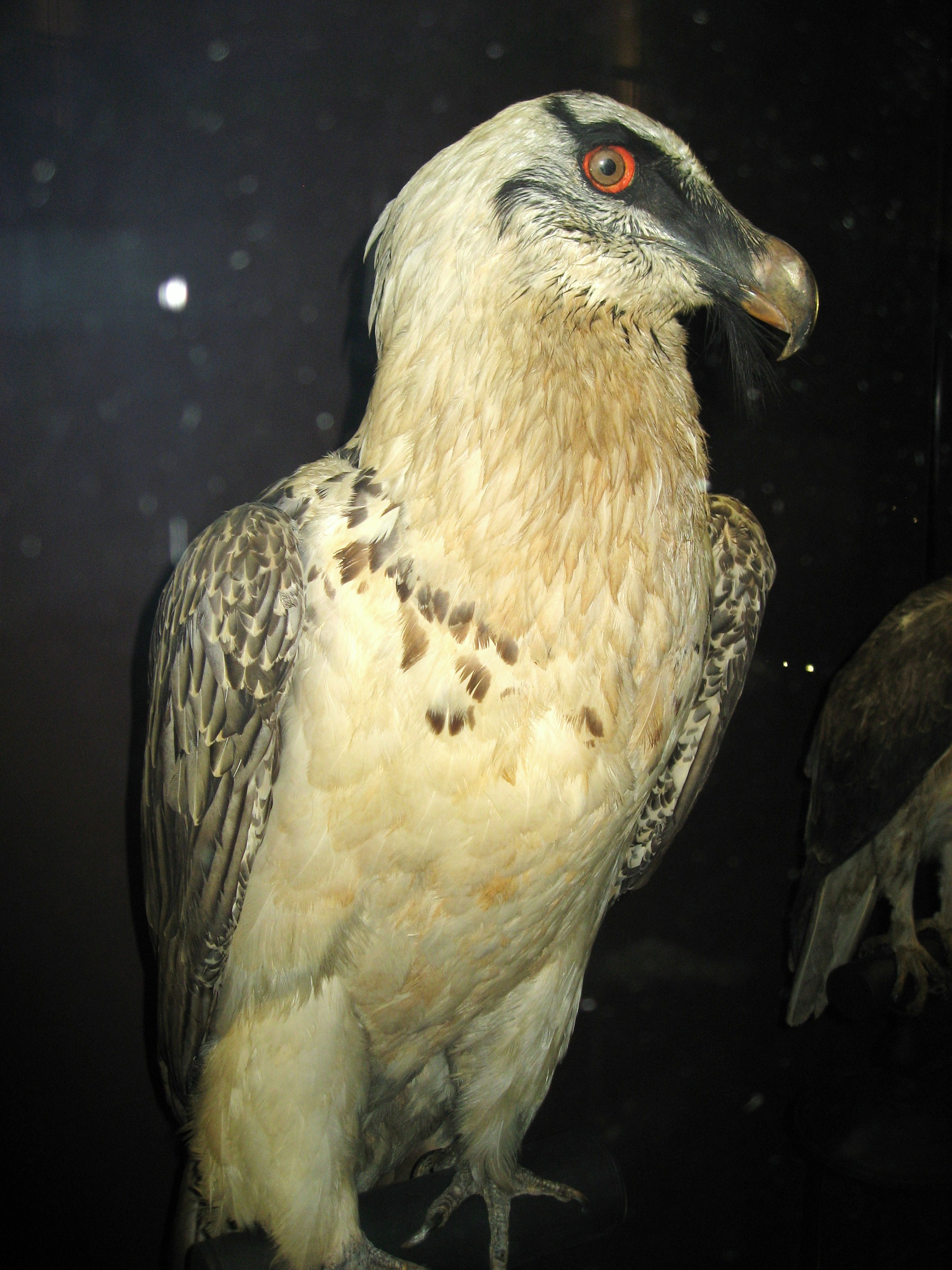
A stuffed bearded vulture (Gypaetus barbatus)

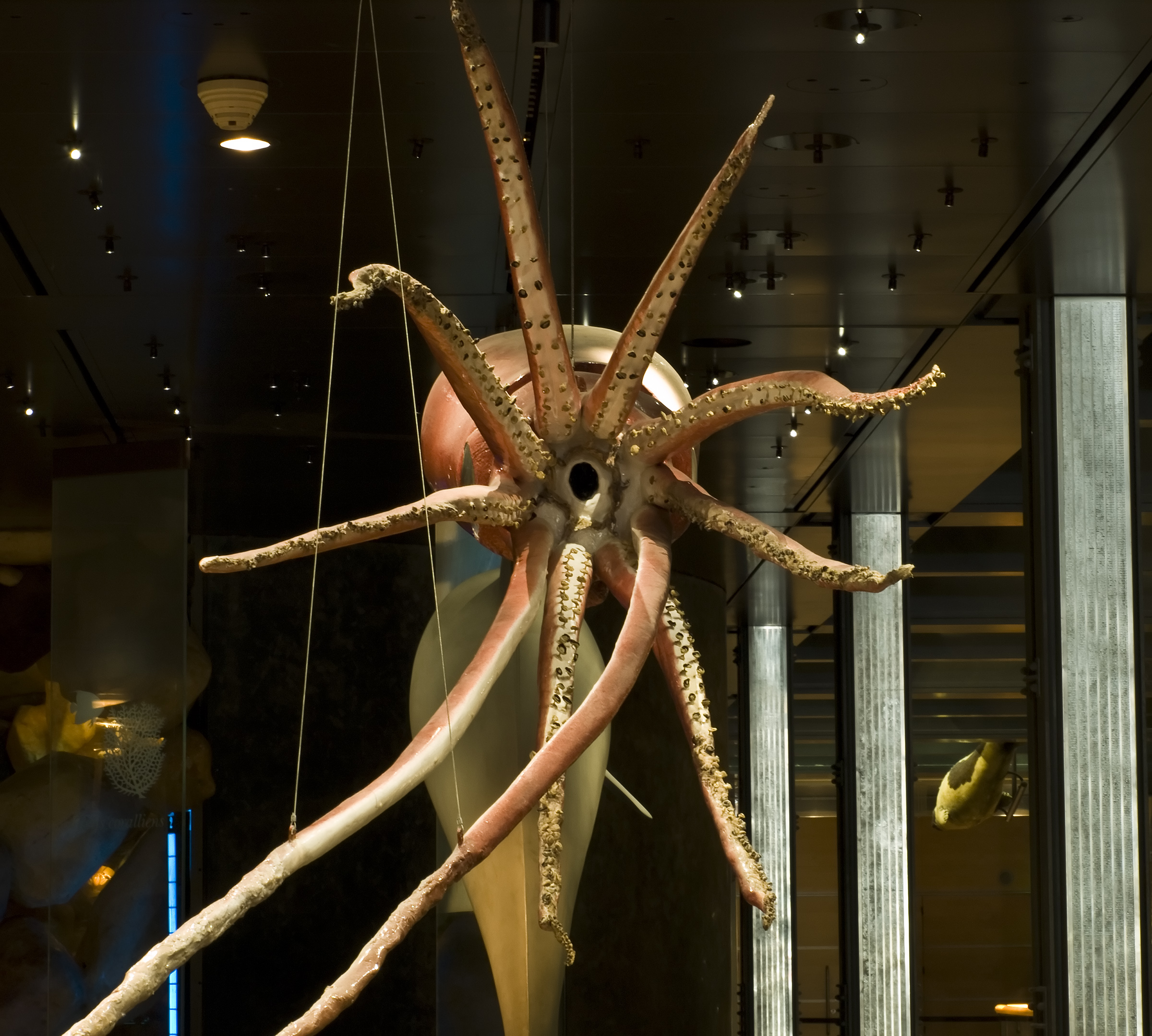
A plastified giant squid (Architeuthis sanctipauli), nine meters long, in the Gallery of Evolution

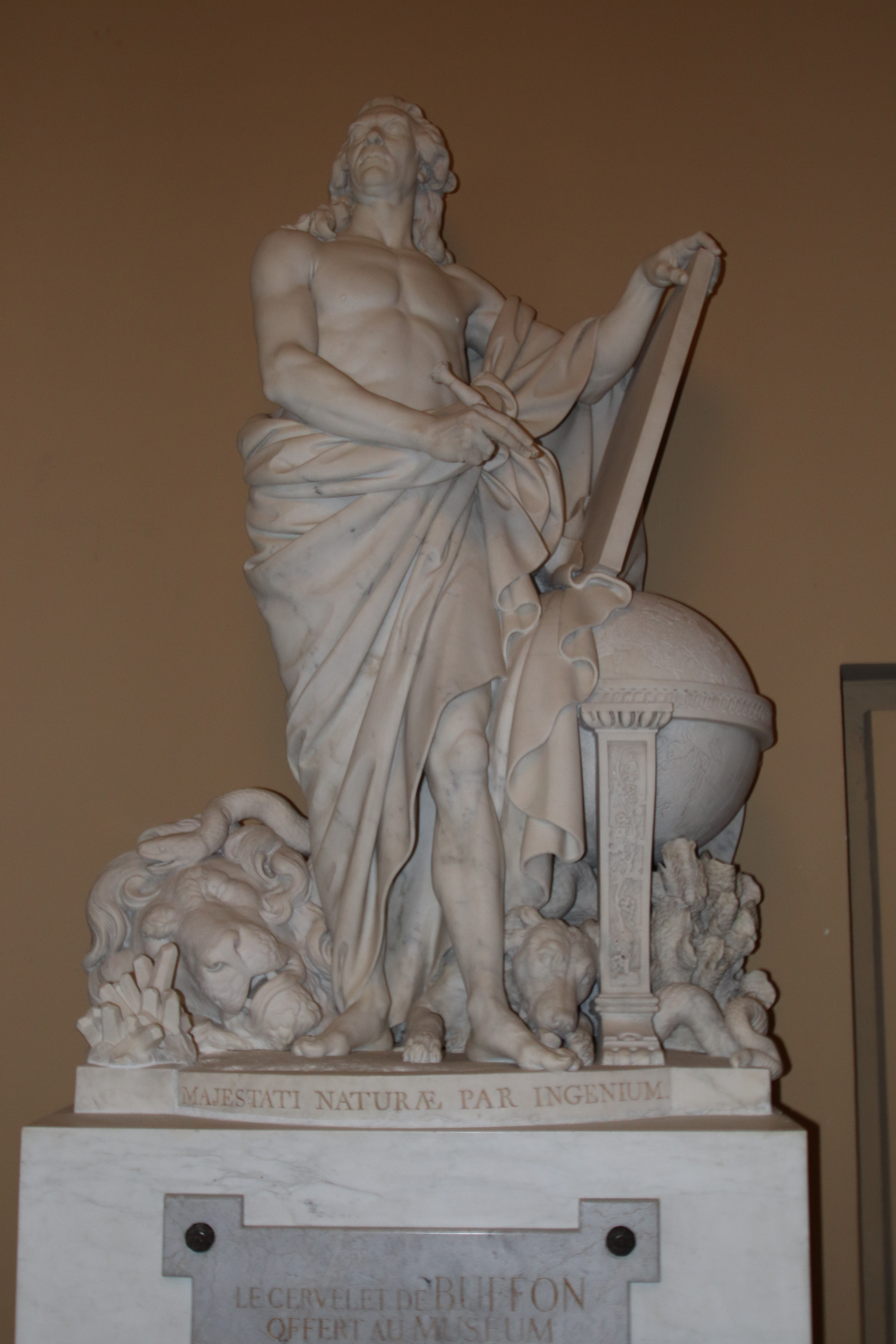
Statue of Buffon by Pajou

The MNHN has been called "the Louvre of the Natural Sciences". Its largest and best-known gallery is the Grand Gallery of Evolution, located at the end of the central alley facing the formal garden. It replaced an earlier Neoclassical gallery built next to the same by Buffon, opened in 1785, and demolished in 1935. It was proposed in 1872 and begun in 1877 by the architect Louis-Jules André, a teacher at the influential École des Beaux-Arts in Paris. It is a prominent example of Beaux Arts Architecture. It was opened in 1889 for the Paris Universal Exposition of 1889, which also presented the Eiffel Tower. It was never fully completed in its original design; it never received the neoclassical entrance planned for the side of the building away from the garden, facing Rue Geoffroy-Saint-Hilaire.

The facade of the building was designed specifically as a backdrop for the garden. The facade facing the garden is divided into eleven traverses. Ten are decorated with sculpted medallions honouring prominent French scientists associated with the MNHN. The central traverse has a larger marble statue of a woman seated holding a book, in a pose similar to that of statue of Buffon facing the building. The statues are the work of Eugene Guillaume, a pupil of the sculptor Pradier.

While the building exterior was neo-classical, the iron framework of the interior was extremely modern for the 19th century, like that of the Gare d'Orsay railroad station of the same period. It contained an immense rectangular hall, 55 metres long, 25 wide, and 15 metres high, supported by forty slender cast-iron columns, and was originally covered with a glass roof one thousand square metres in size. The building suffered from technical problems, and was closed entirely in 1965. It was extensively remodelled between 1991 and 1994 and reopened in its present form.

The great central hall, kept in its same form but enlarged during the modernisation, is devoted to the presentation of marine animals on the lower sides, and, on a platform in the centre, a parade of full-size African mammals, including a rhinoceros originally presented to King Louis XV in the 18th century. On the garden side is another hall, in its original size, devoted to animals which have disappeared or are in danger of extinction.

=== Gallery of Mineralogy and Geology ===
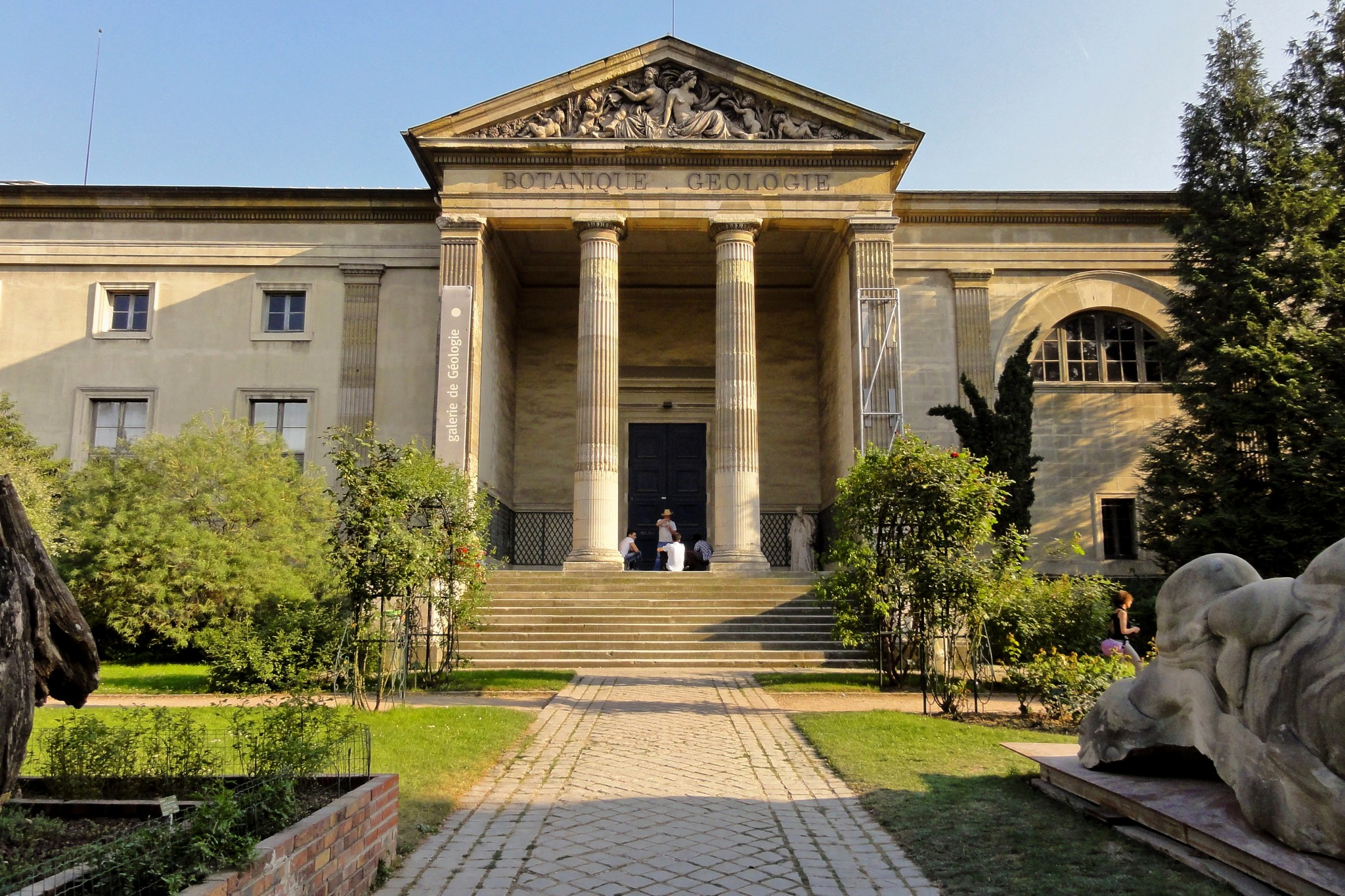
Gallery of Mineralogy and Geology

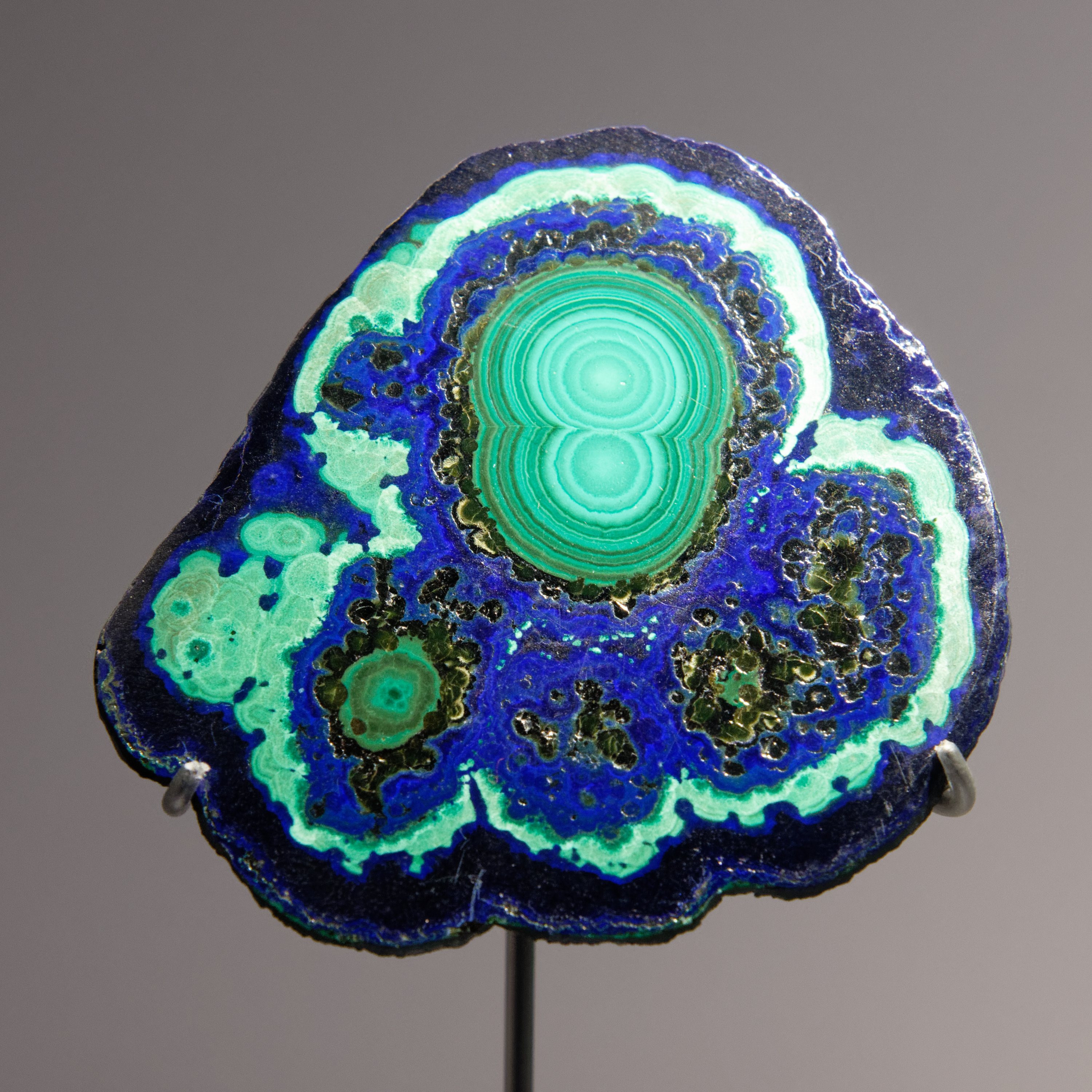
Examples of malachite and azurite, donated by J.P. Morgan in 1903

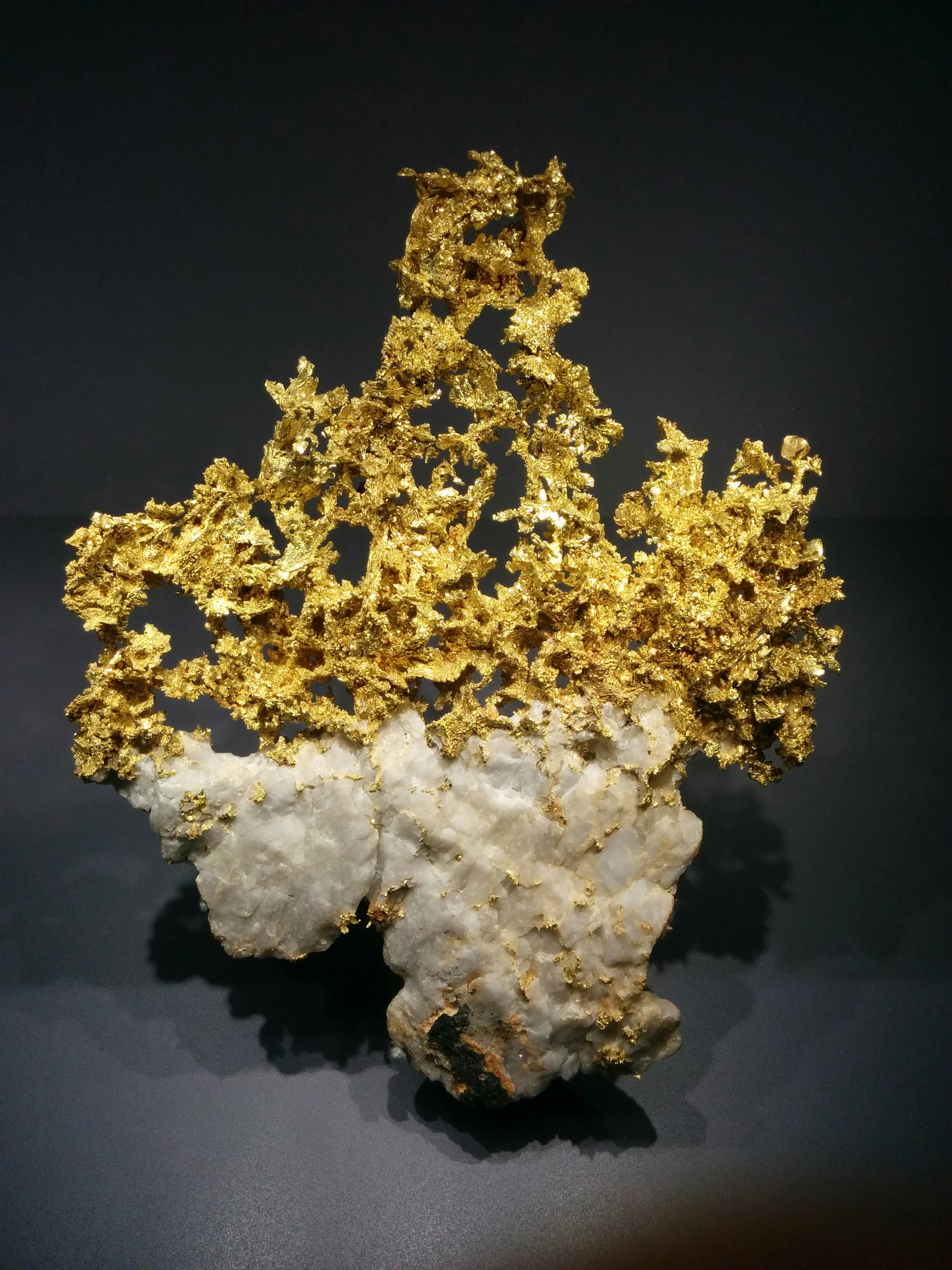
Native gold and quartz from California

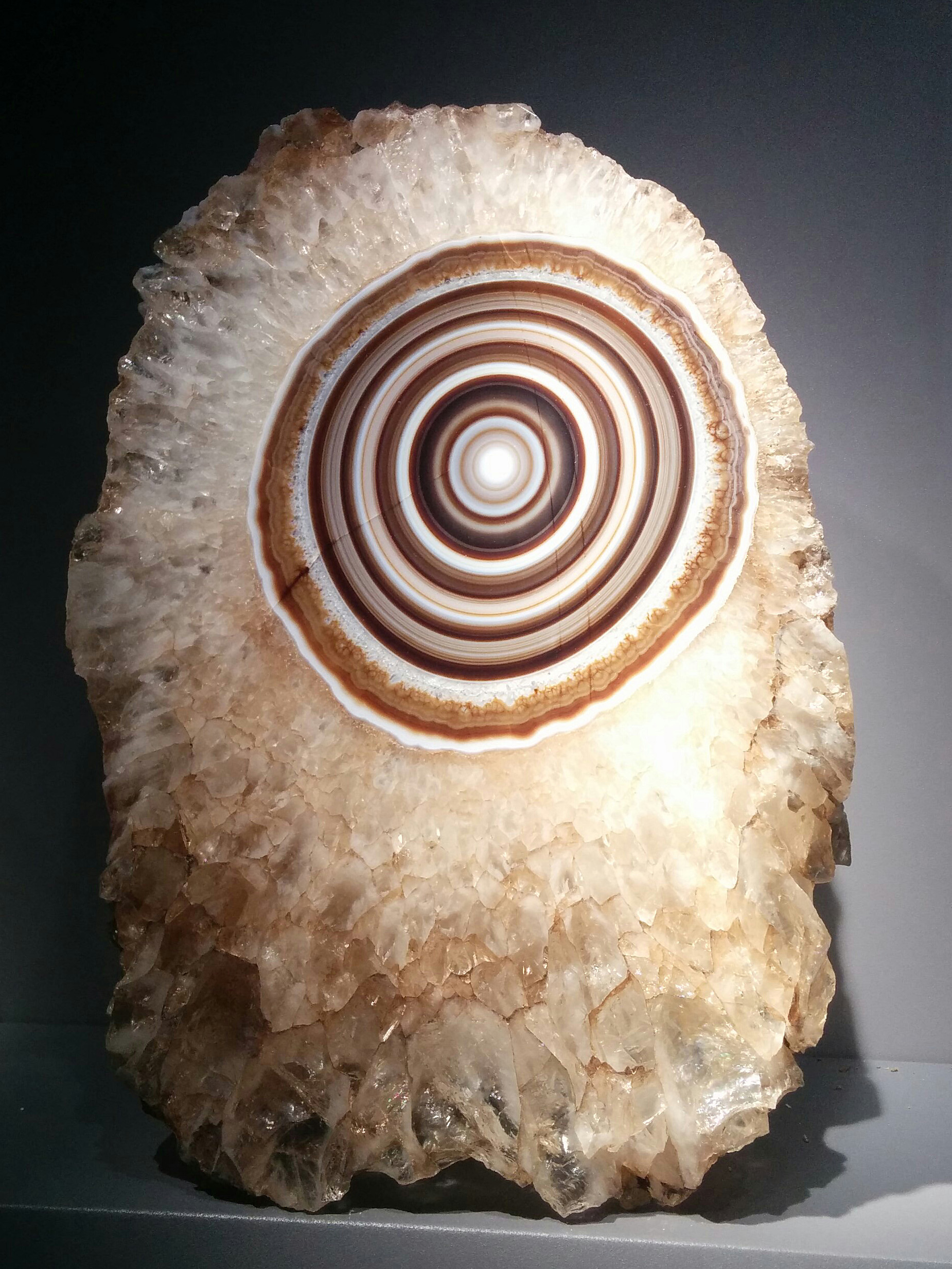
Quartz from Uruguay

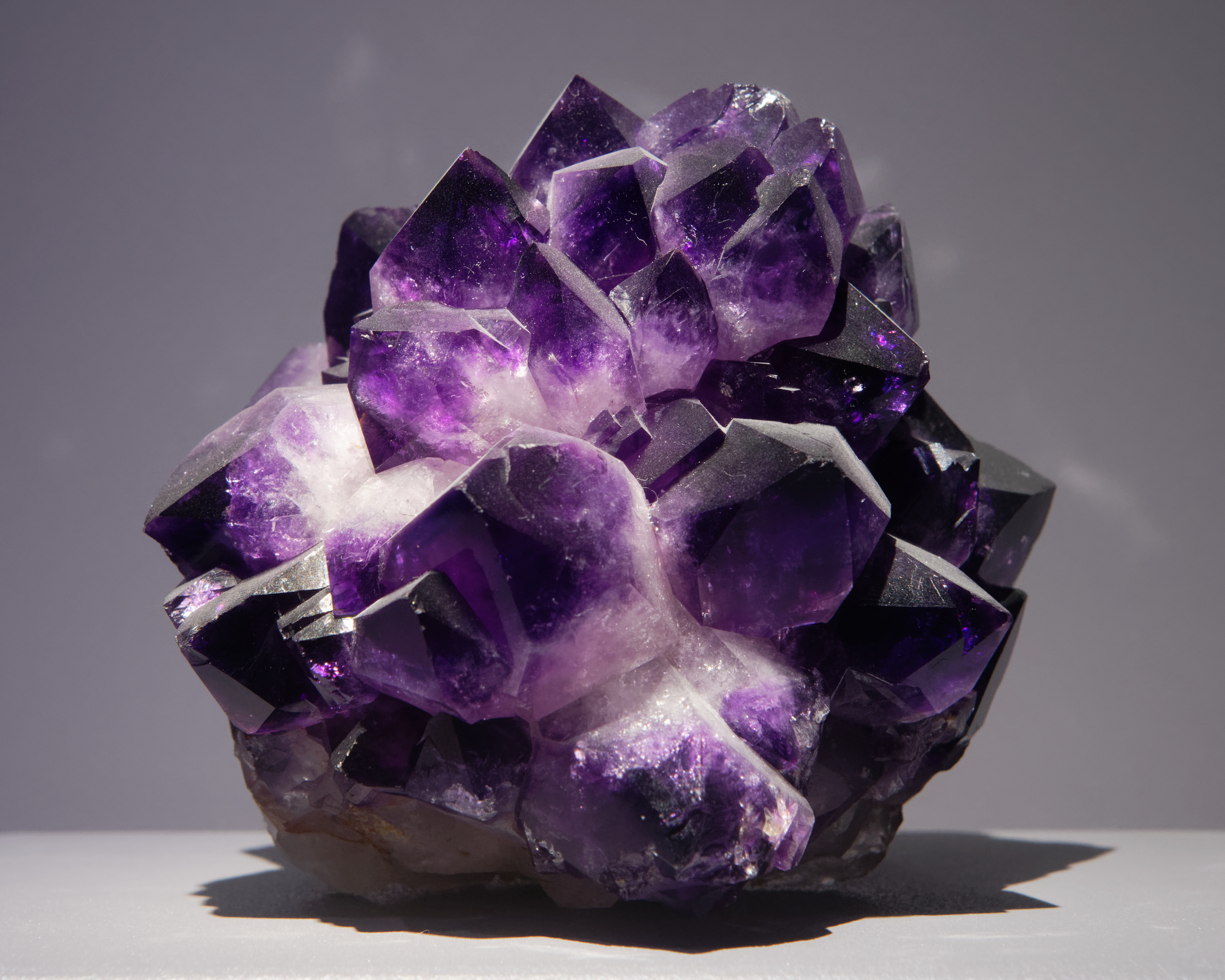
Amethyst from Siberia

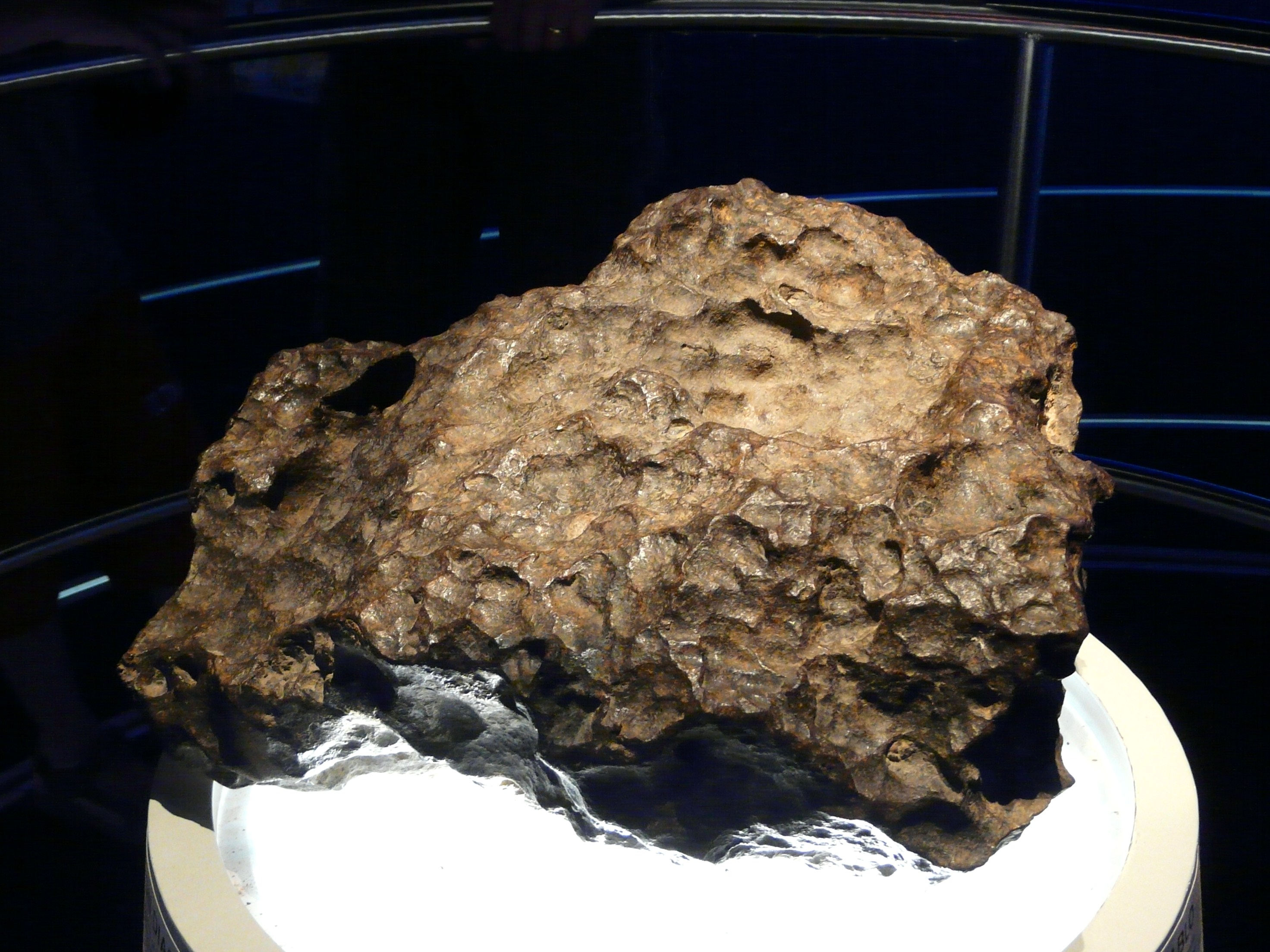
Fragment of the Canyon Diablo Meteorite which created Meteor Crater in Arizona

The Gallery of Mineralogy, looking across the formal garden and close to the Gallery of Evolution, was constructed between 1833 and 1837 by Charles Rohault de Fleury in a neoclassical style, with two porticos of Doric columns. Directly in front is the rose garden, renewed in 1990 with 170 types of European roses, as well as a Japanese pagoda tree (Styphnolobium japonicum), planted there by Bernard de Jussieu in 1747.

The gallery contains over 600,000 stones and fossils. It is particularly known for its collection of giant crystals, including colourful examples of azurite, tourmaline (rubelite), malachite and ammonite.ammonite Other displays include the jars and vestiges of the original royal apothecary of Louis XIV, and three Florentine marble marquetry tables from the palace of Cardinal Mazarin.

The gallery also contains a large collection of meteorites which have been gathered from around the world. This includes a large fragment of Canyon Diablo meteorite, a piece of an asteroid which landed on Earth about 550,000 years ago and created the Meteor Crater in Arizona. It weighs 360 kg (790 lb).

=== Gallery of Botany ===
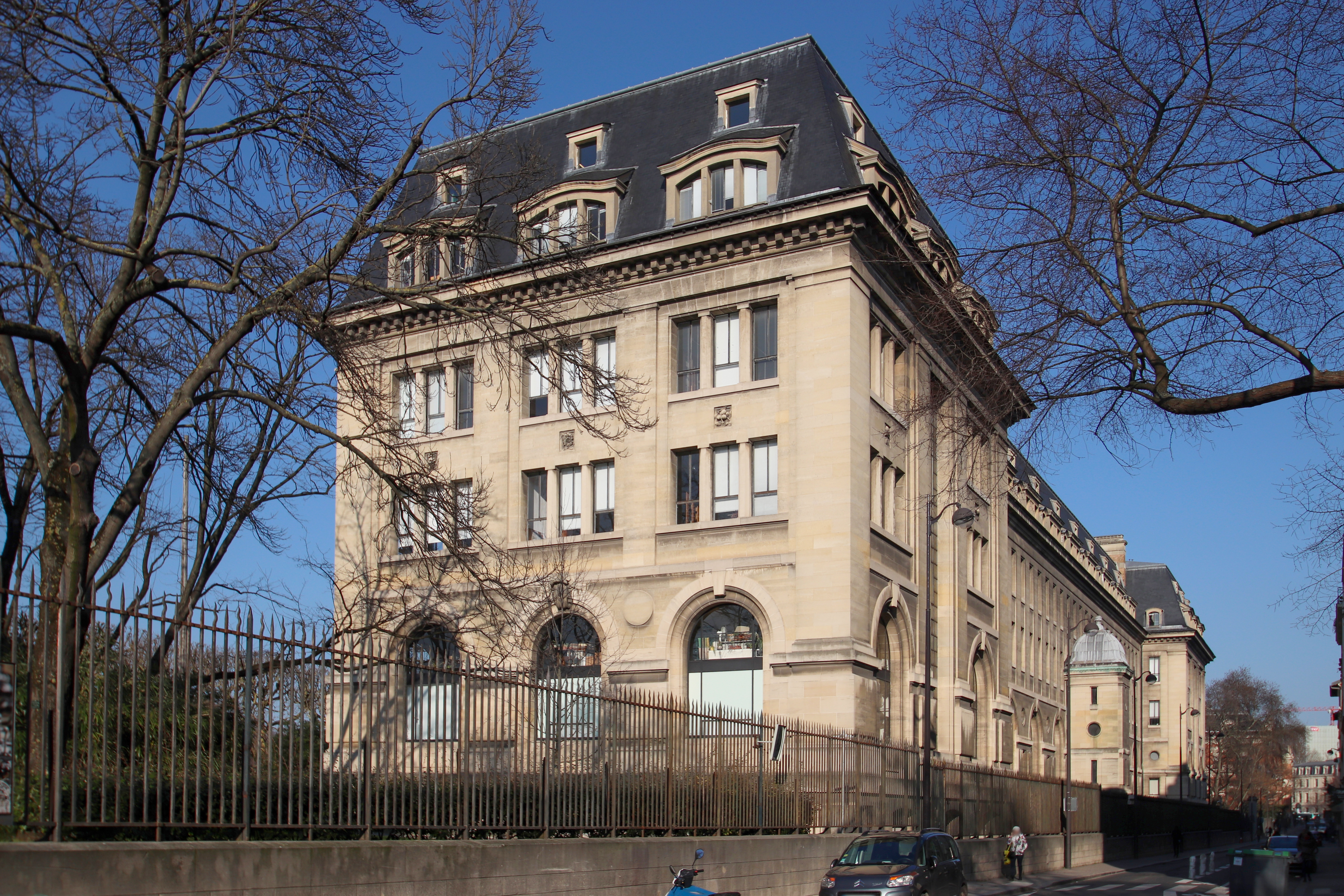
The Gallery of Botany. At left is a black locust tree (Robinia pseudoacacia), one of the two oldest trees in Paris, planted in 1635 by Vespasien Robin

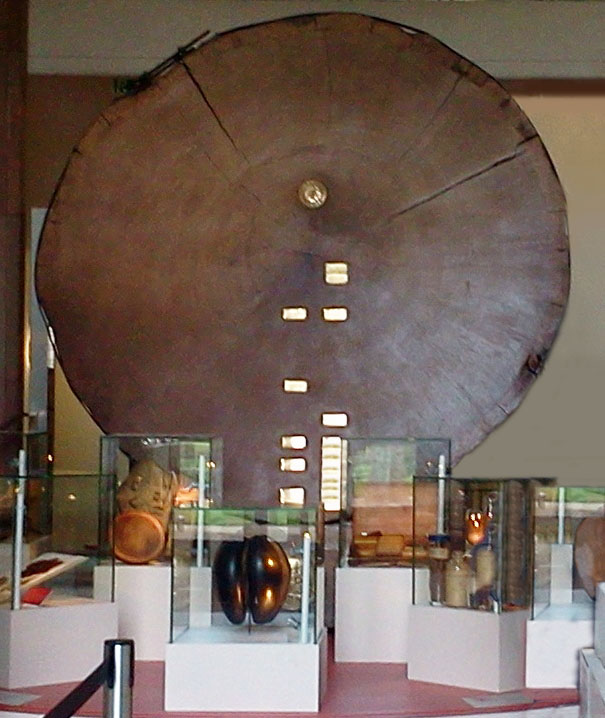
Slice of a giant Sequoia tree (Sequoiadendron giganteum) in the Gallery of Botany

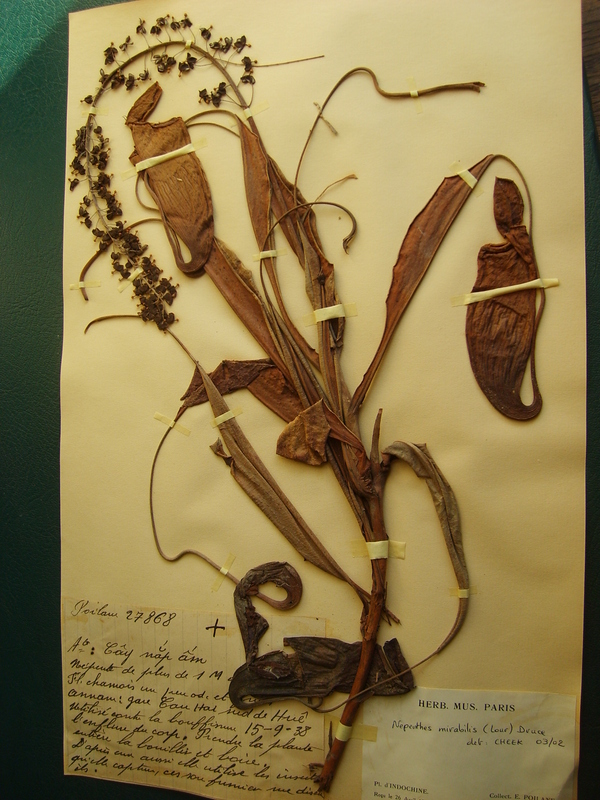
Specimen of the tropical pitcher plant (Nepenthes mirabilis) from Southeast Asia, one of 7.5 million plants in the Herbier National

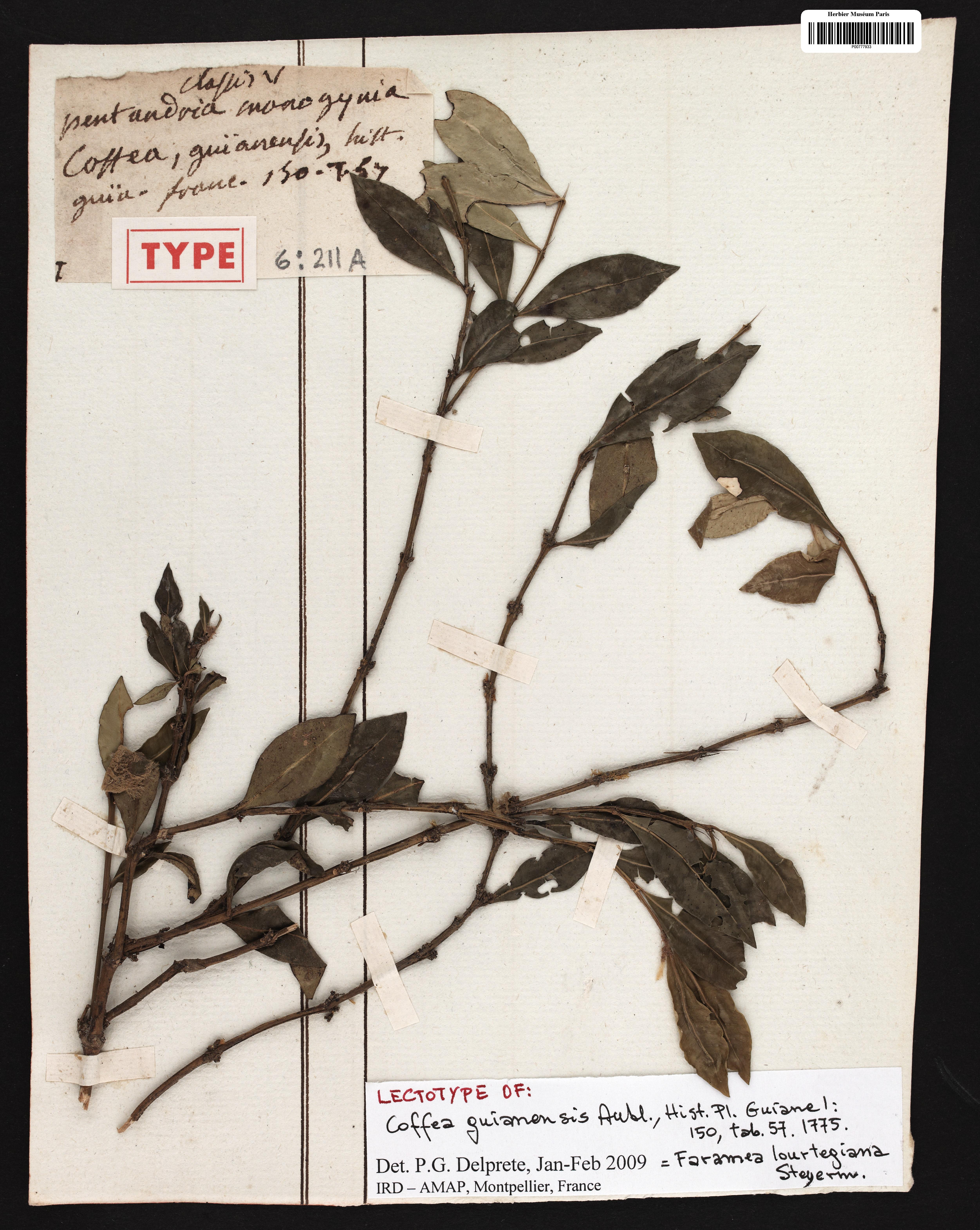
A coffee plant from Guyana ("Coffea guianensis"), collected by Jean Baptiste Christophore Fusée Aublet in 1775

The Gallery of Botany is on the Allée the Buffon facing the centre of the garden, between the Gallery of Mineralogy and the Gallery of Palaeontology. At the corner is one of the two oldest trees in Paris, a Robinia pseudoacacia or black locust, planted in 1635 by Vespasien Robin, the royal gardener and botanist, from an earlier tree brought from America by his brother, also a botanist, in 1601. It is tied in age with another from the same source planted at the same time on the square of Saint-Julien-le-Pauvre.

The Gallery was built in 1930–35 with a grant from the Rockefeller Foundation. Directly in front is a statue entitled "Science and Mystery" by Jean-Louis Schroeder, made in 1889. It depicts an old man pondering an egg, contemplating the enigma of which came first.

The primary content of the gallery is the Herbier National, a collection representing 7.5 million plants collected since the founding of the museum. They are divided for study into Spermatophytes, plants which reproduce with seeds, and cryptogams, plants which reproduce with spores, such as algae, lichens and mushrooms. Many of the plants were collected by Jean Baptiste Christophore Fusée Aublet, the royal pharmacist and botanist in French Guiana. In 1775 he published his "Histoire des plantes de la Guiane Française" describing 576 genera and 1,241 species of neotropical plants, including more than 400 species that were new to science, at a time when only 20,000 plants had been described,

The ground floor interior of the gallery has vestibules built in a combination of Art Deco and Neo-Egyptian styles. It is used for temporary exhibits. The exhibits include a slice of a giant sequoia tree, 2200 years old, which fell naturally in 1917.

=== The Gallery of Palaeontology and Comparative Anatomy ===
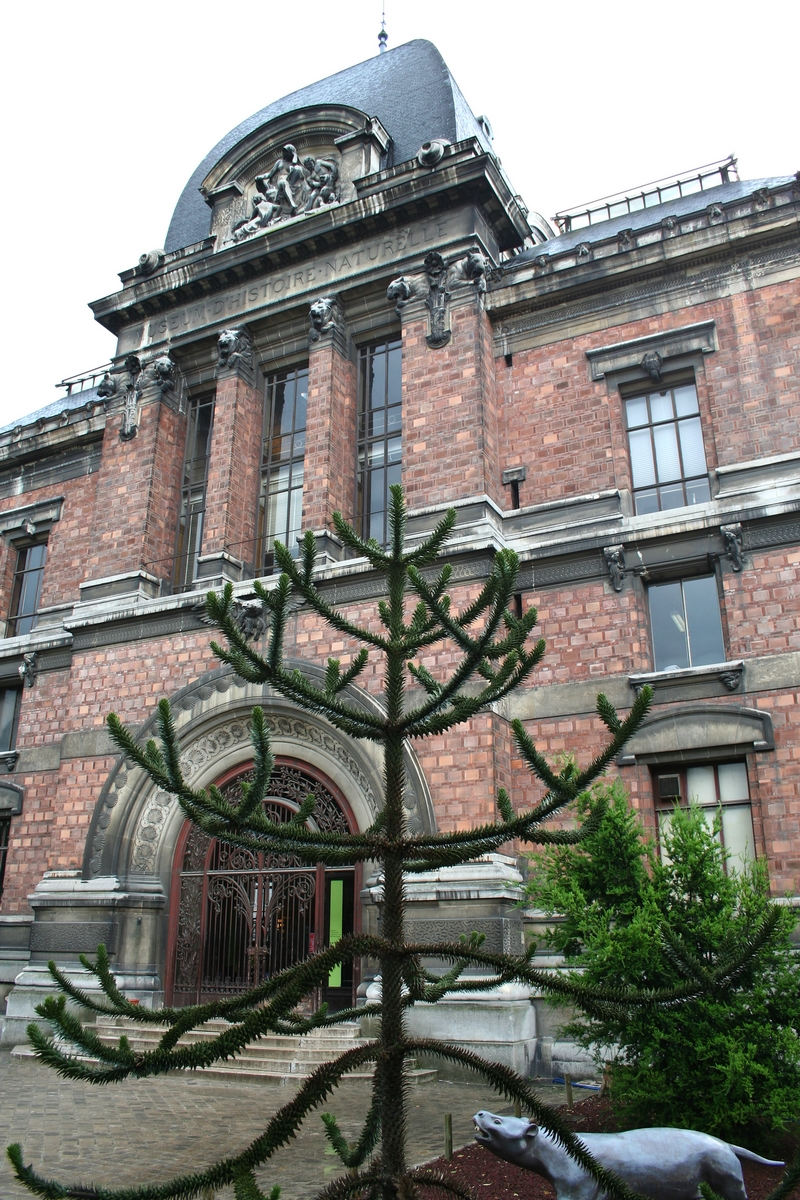
Facade of the Gallery of Palaeontology and Comparative Anatomy

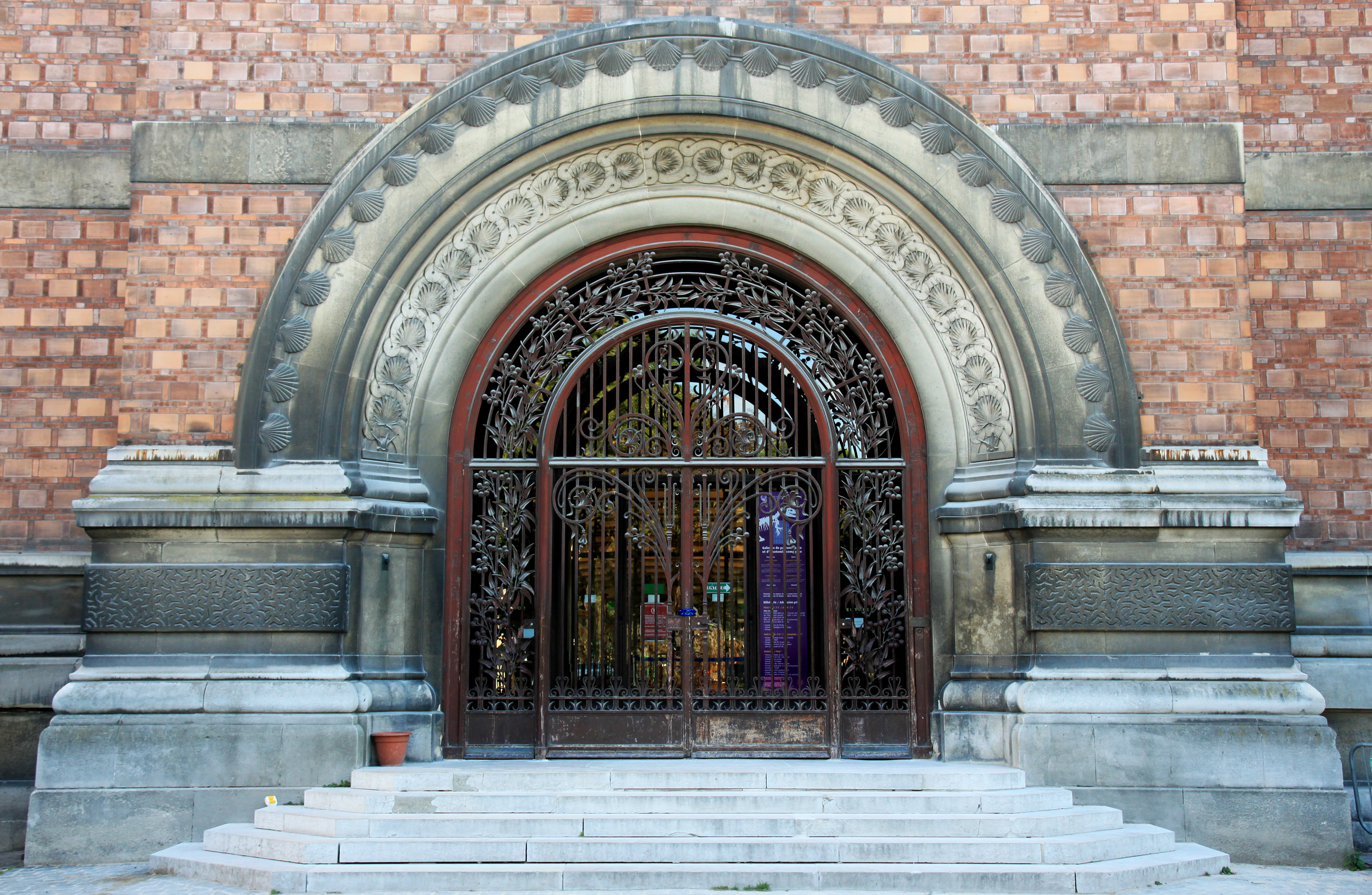
Relief sculpture and ironwork on the entrance of the gallery

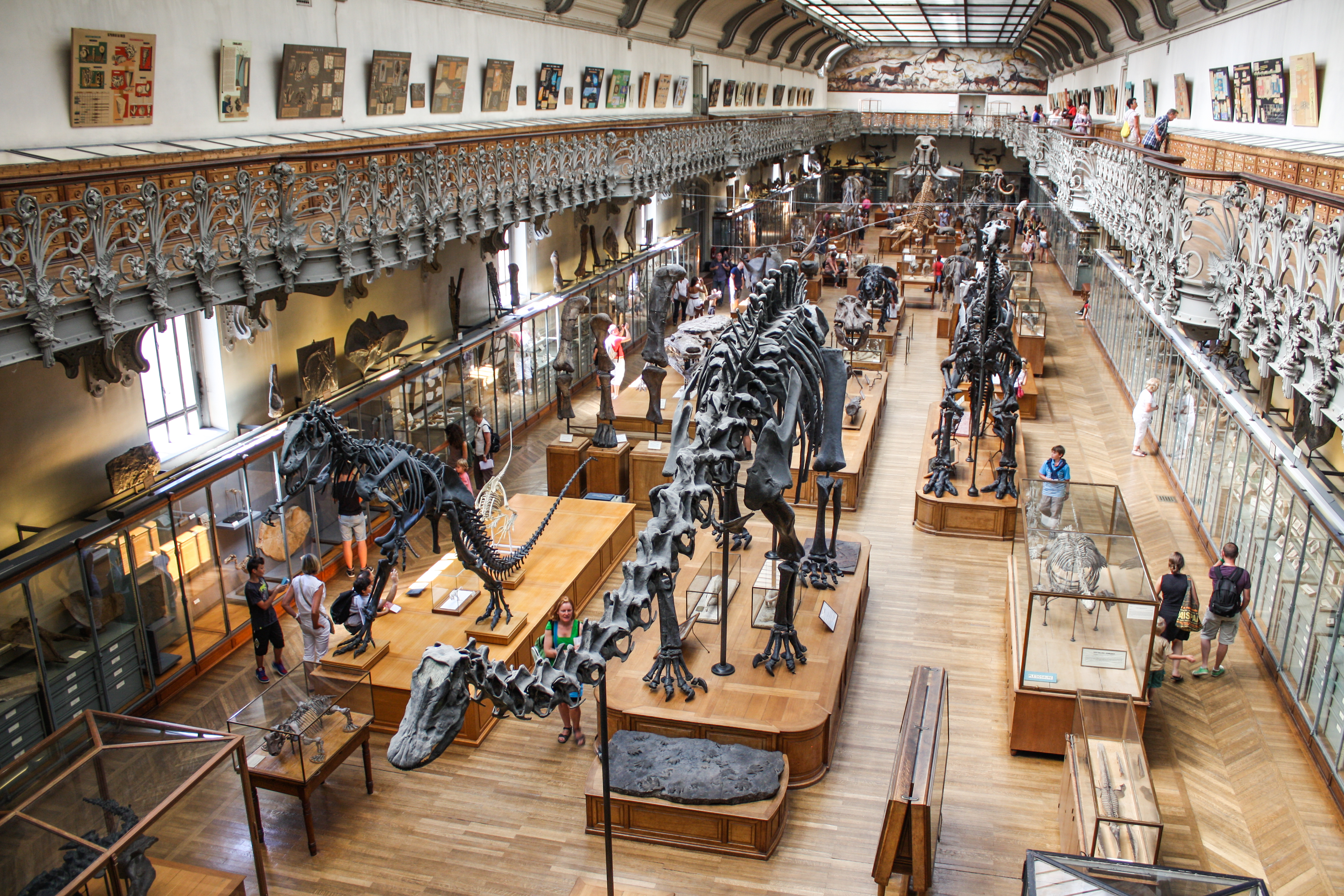
Dinosaur gallery

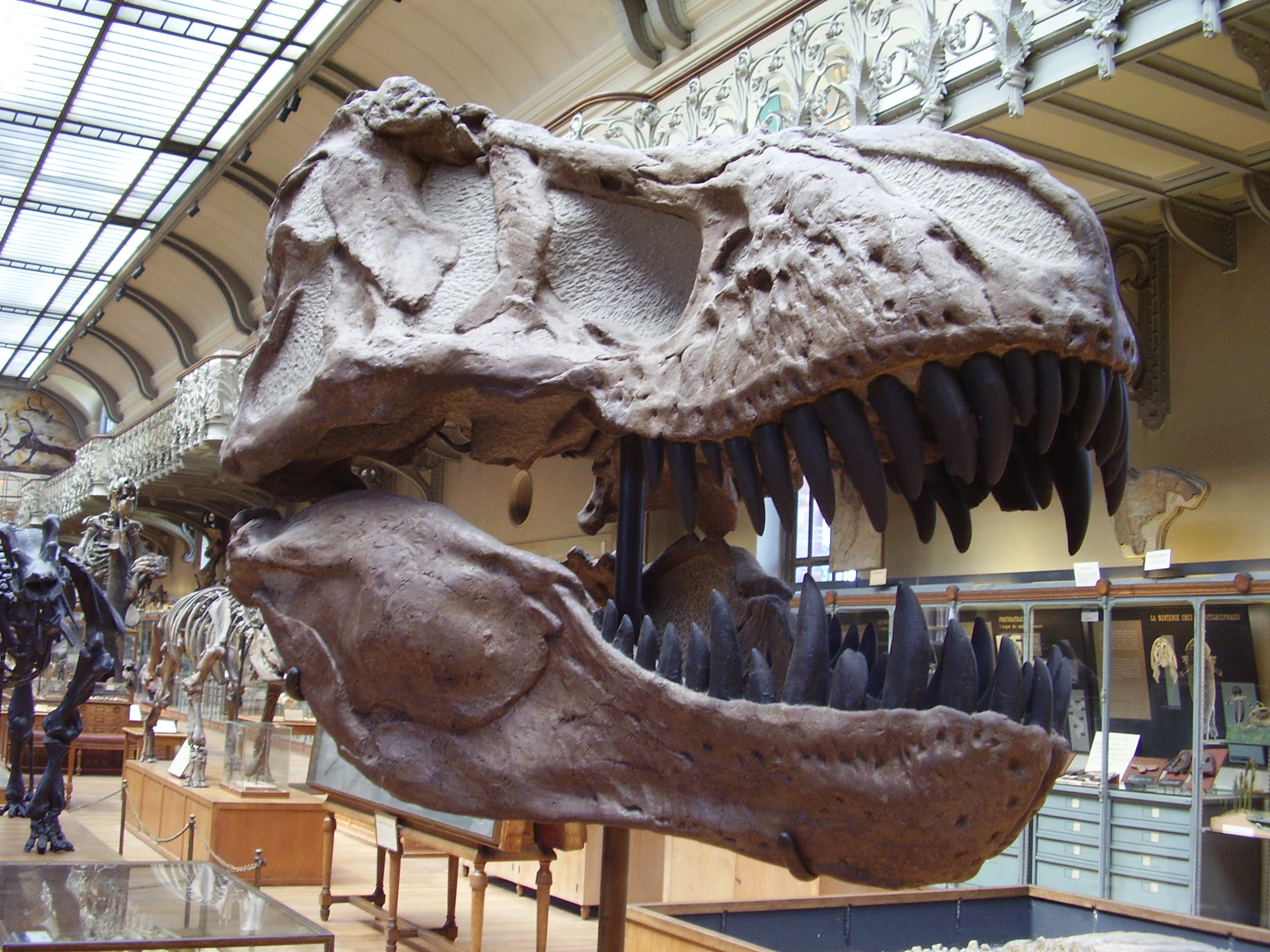
Skull cast of a Tyrannosaurus rex

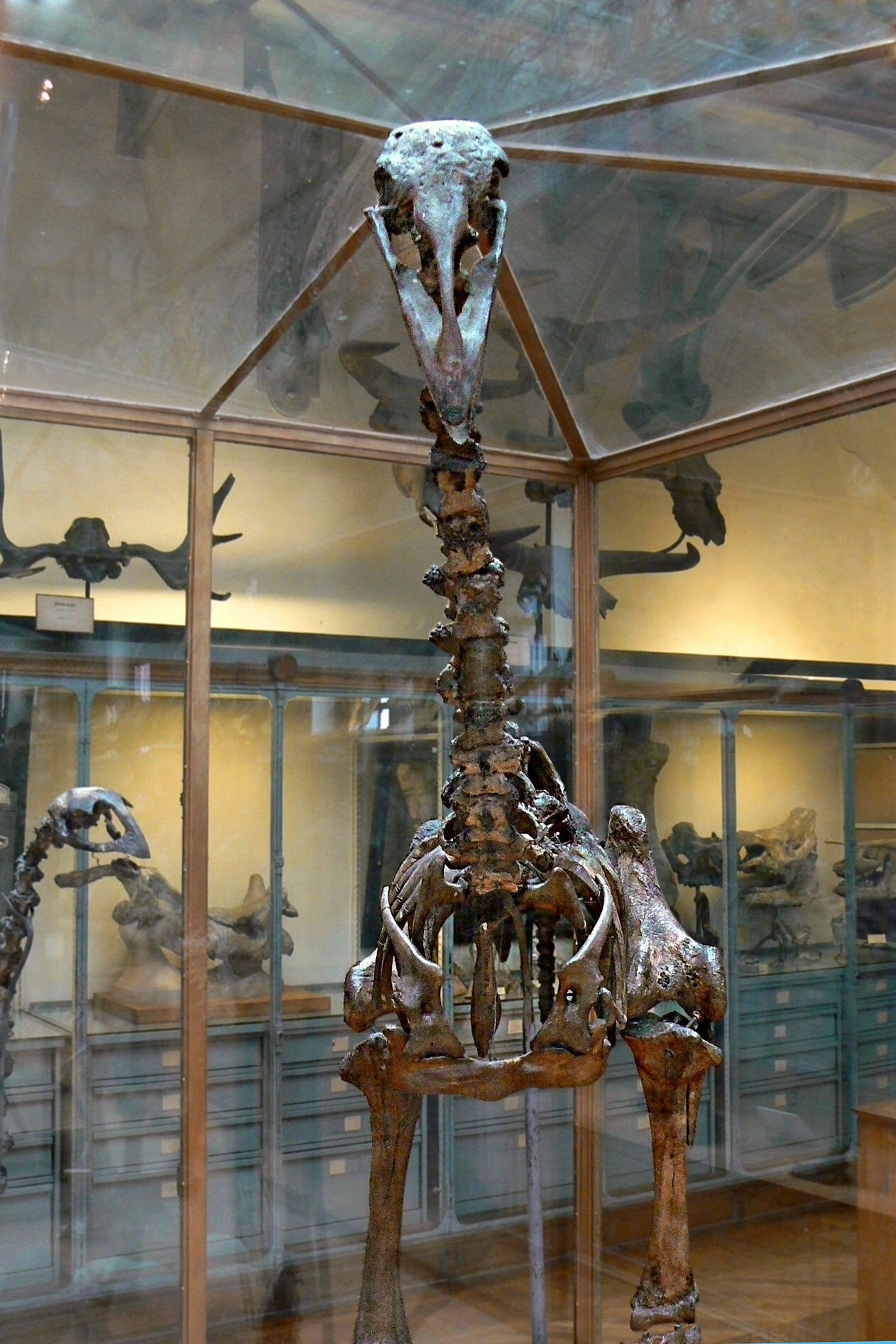
Skeleton of an Elephant Bird (Aepyornis)

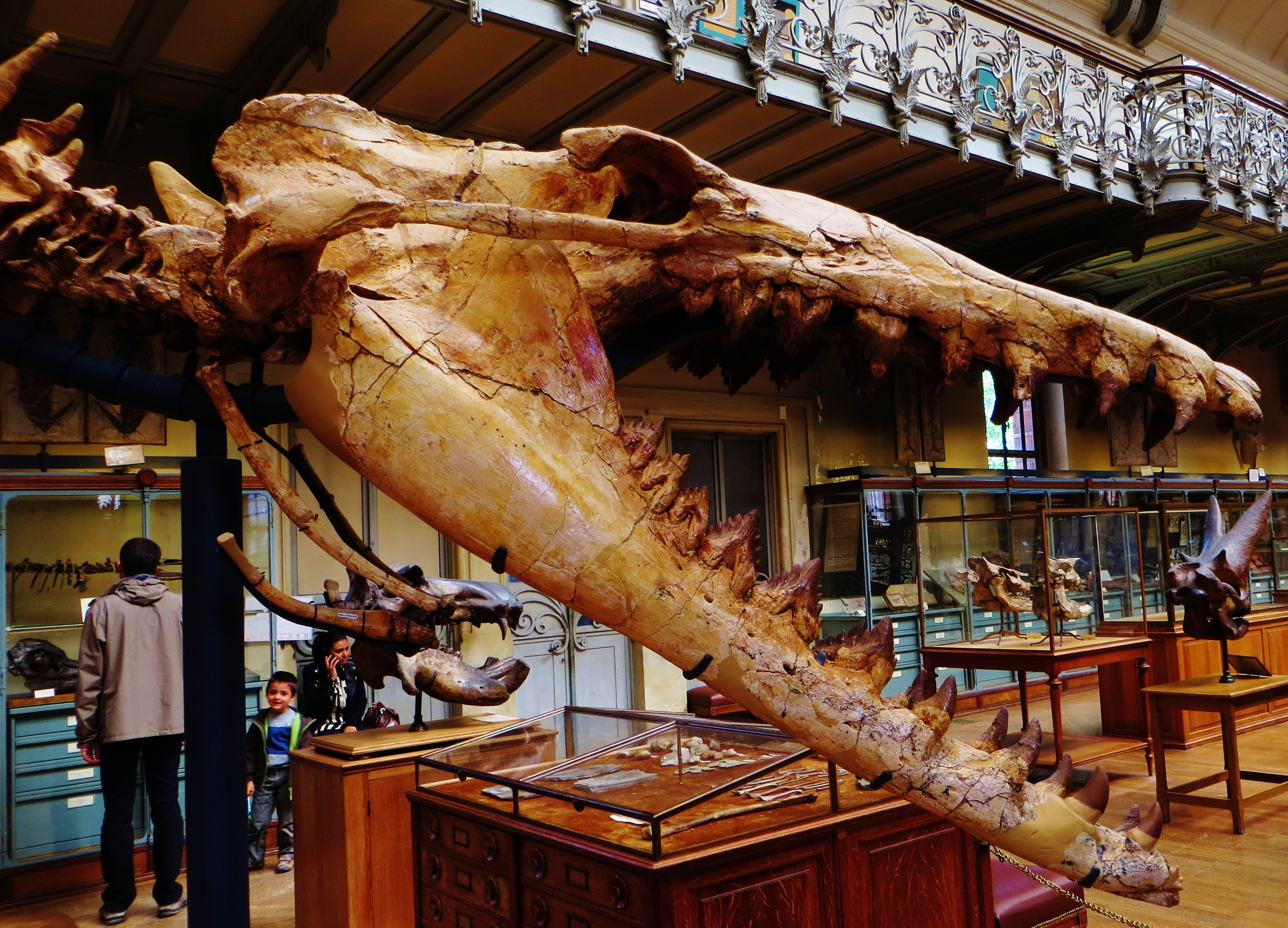
Skull of a Cynthiacetus, an early whale, from Peru

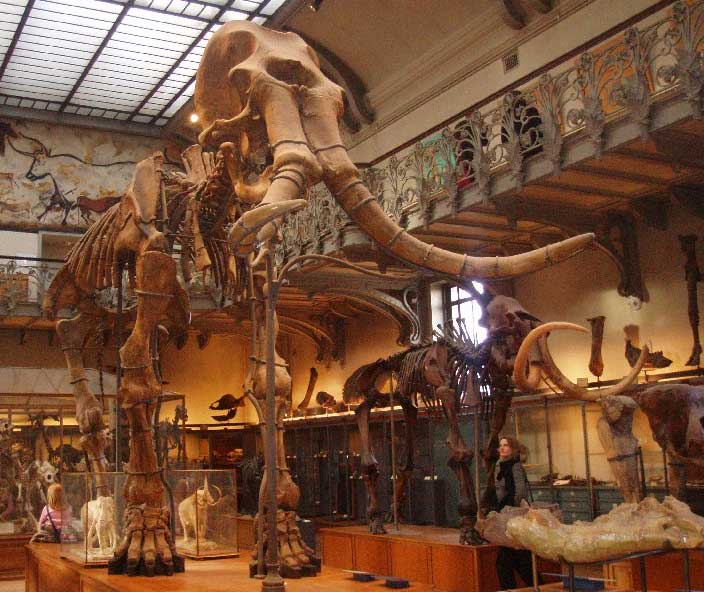
Skeleton of a Southern Mammoth (Mammuthus meridionalis)

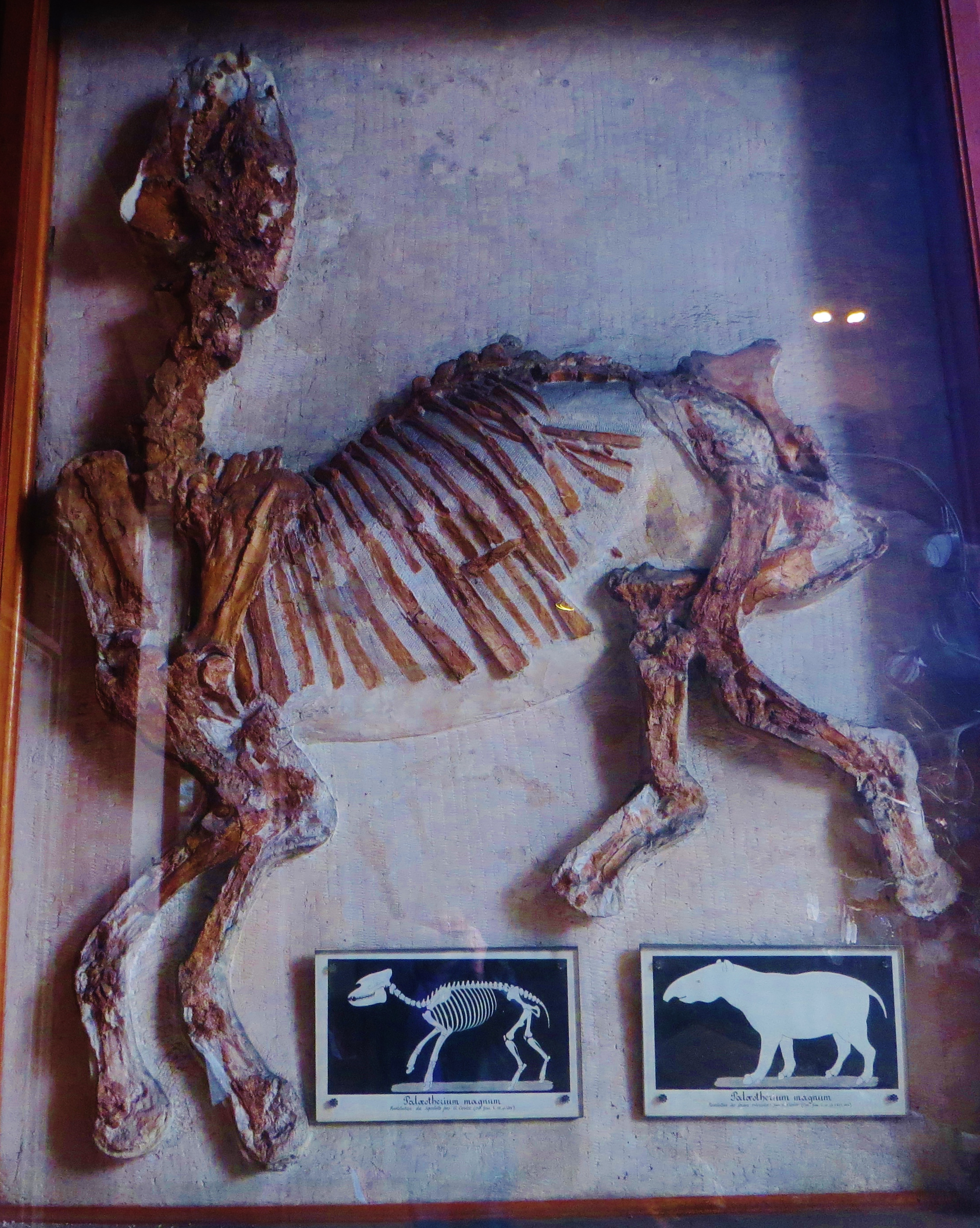
Skeleton of a Palaeotherium, an early equoid

The Gallery of Palaeontology and Comparative Anatomy was built between 1894 and 1897 by architect Ferdinand Dutert, who had built the innovative iron-framed Galerie des machines at the 1889 Paris Exposition. A new pavilion in the same style was added to the west side of the gallery; it was completed in 1961. In front of the Gallery is the Iris Garden, created in 1964, which displays 260 varieties of iris flowers, and a sculpture, "Nymph with a pitcher" (1837) by Isidore Hippolyte Brion. The sides of gallery are also decorated with sculpture; twelve relief sculptures of animals in bronze and fourteen medallions of famous biologists. The ironwork grill and stone arches over the entrance are filled with elaborate designs and sculpture of seashells. Inside the entrance is a large marble statue of an Orangutan strangling a hunter, created in 1885 by the noted animal sculptor Emmanuel Fremiet, best known for his statue of Joan of Arc on horseback on the Place des Pyramides in Paris.

=== Jardin des Plantes ===
The Jardin des Plantes is the home of the main galleries of the MNHN, and a division of the museum, which was born there. The garden was founded by Louis XIII 1635 as the Royal Garden of medicinal plants, under the direction of the royal physician. In the early 18th century, the chateau of the gardens was enlarged to house the collections of the royal pharmacist. In 1729, this collection was broadened into the Cabinet of Natural History, destined to receive the Royal collections dedicated to zoology and mineralogy. New plants and animal species were collected from around the world, examined, illustrated, classified, named and described in publications which were circulated across Europe and to America. An amphitheatre was constructed in the garden in 1787 to provide a venue for lectures and classes on the new discoveries. New greenhouses were built beginning in 1788, and the size of the gardens was doubled. The gardens served as the laboratory of scientists including Jean Baptiste Lamarck, author of the earliest theory of evolution, and were a base for major scientific expeditions by Nicolas Baudin, Alexander von Humboldt, Jules Dumont d'Urville and others throughout the 18th and 19th century.

The gardens today include a large formal garden planted in geometric designs; and two enormous greenhouses, keeping tropical plants at a steady temperature of 22 degrees Celsius. The Alpine gardens present plants coming from Corsica, the Caucasus, North American and the Himalaya. The gardens of the School of Botany contain 3,800 species of plants, displayed by genre and family.

=== Ménagerie of the Jardin des Plantes ===
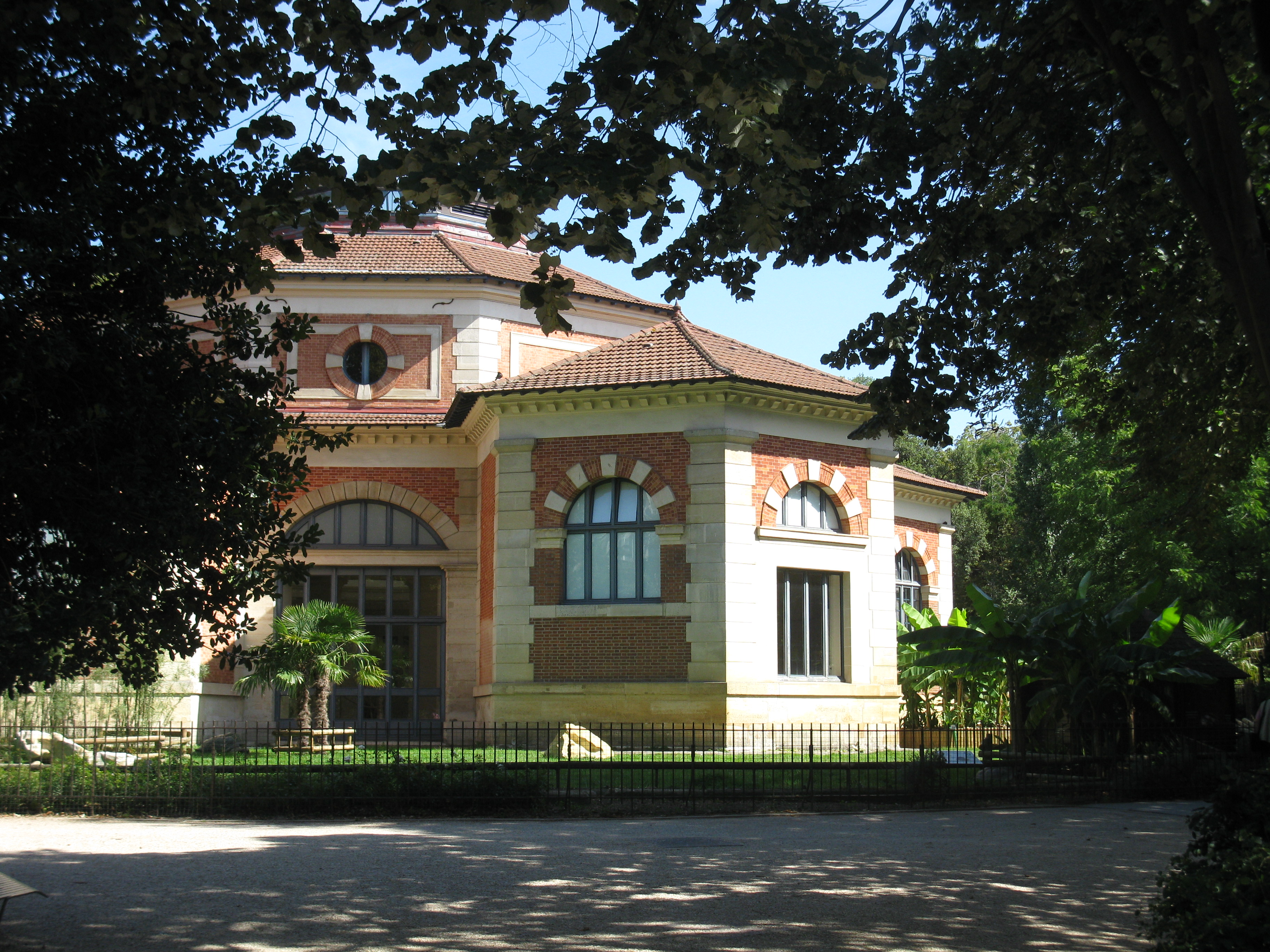
The Rotunda of the Menagerie

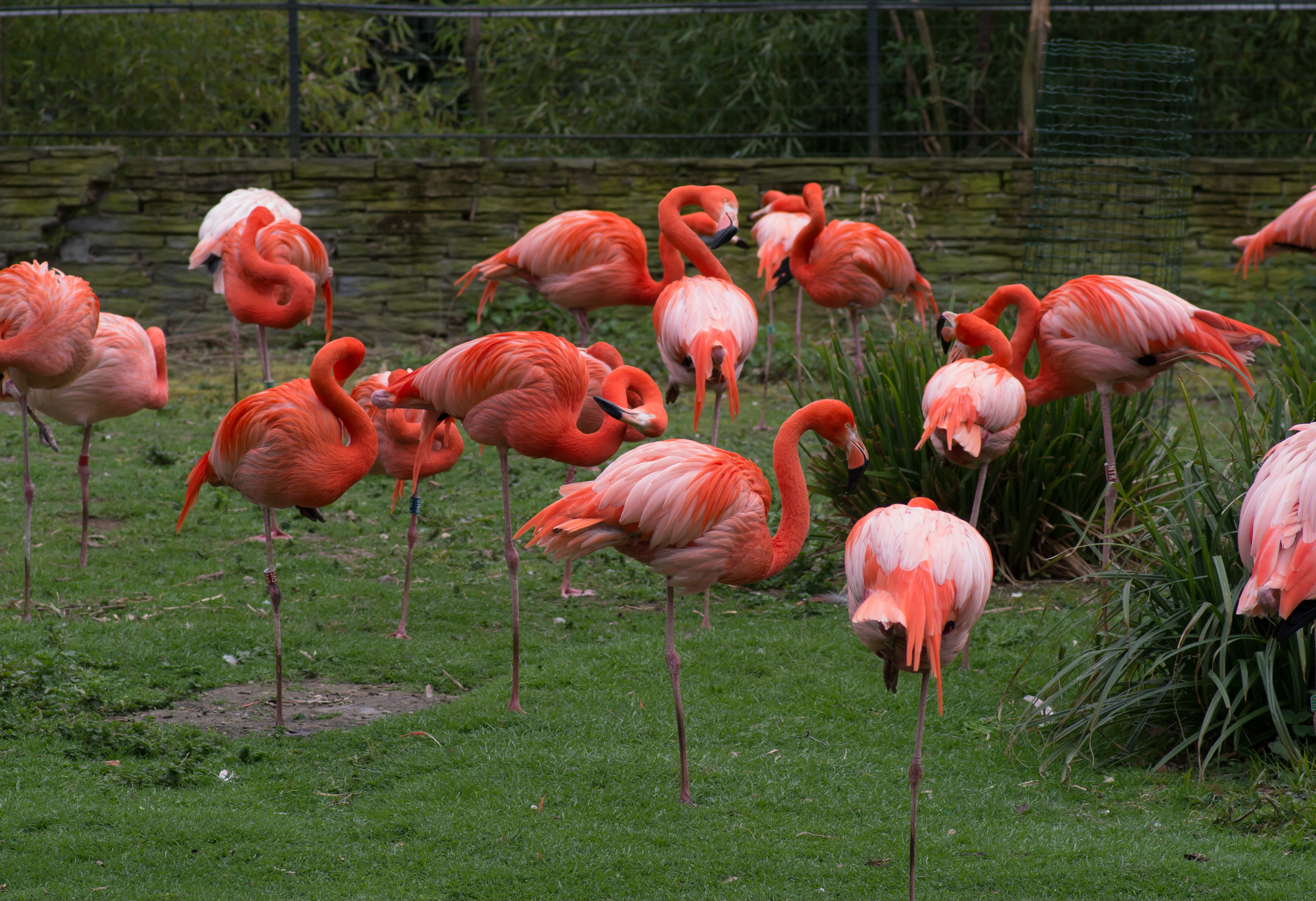
Pink flamingoes in the Menagerie

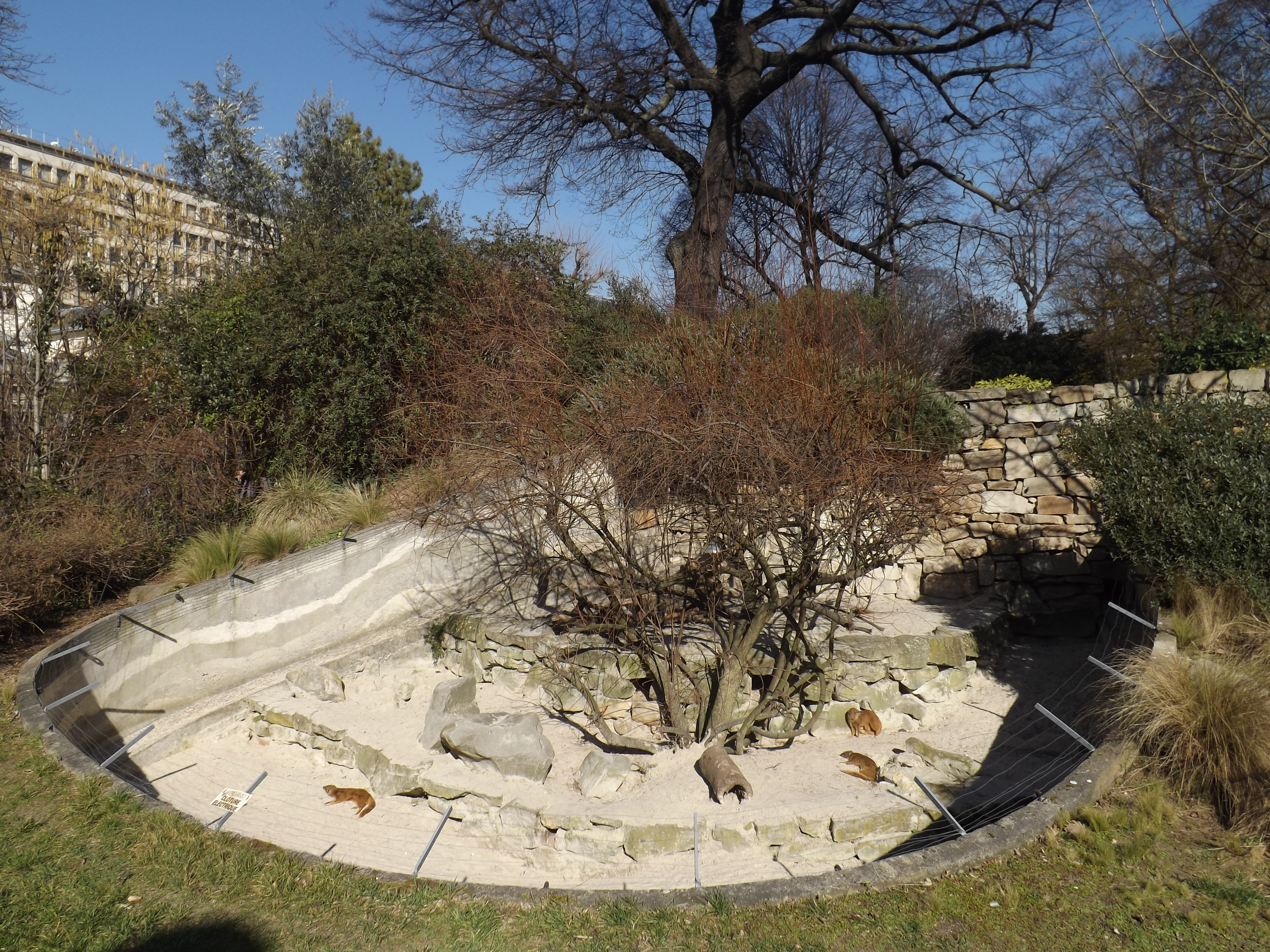
Enclosure for mongooses

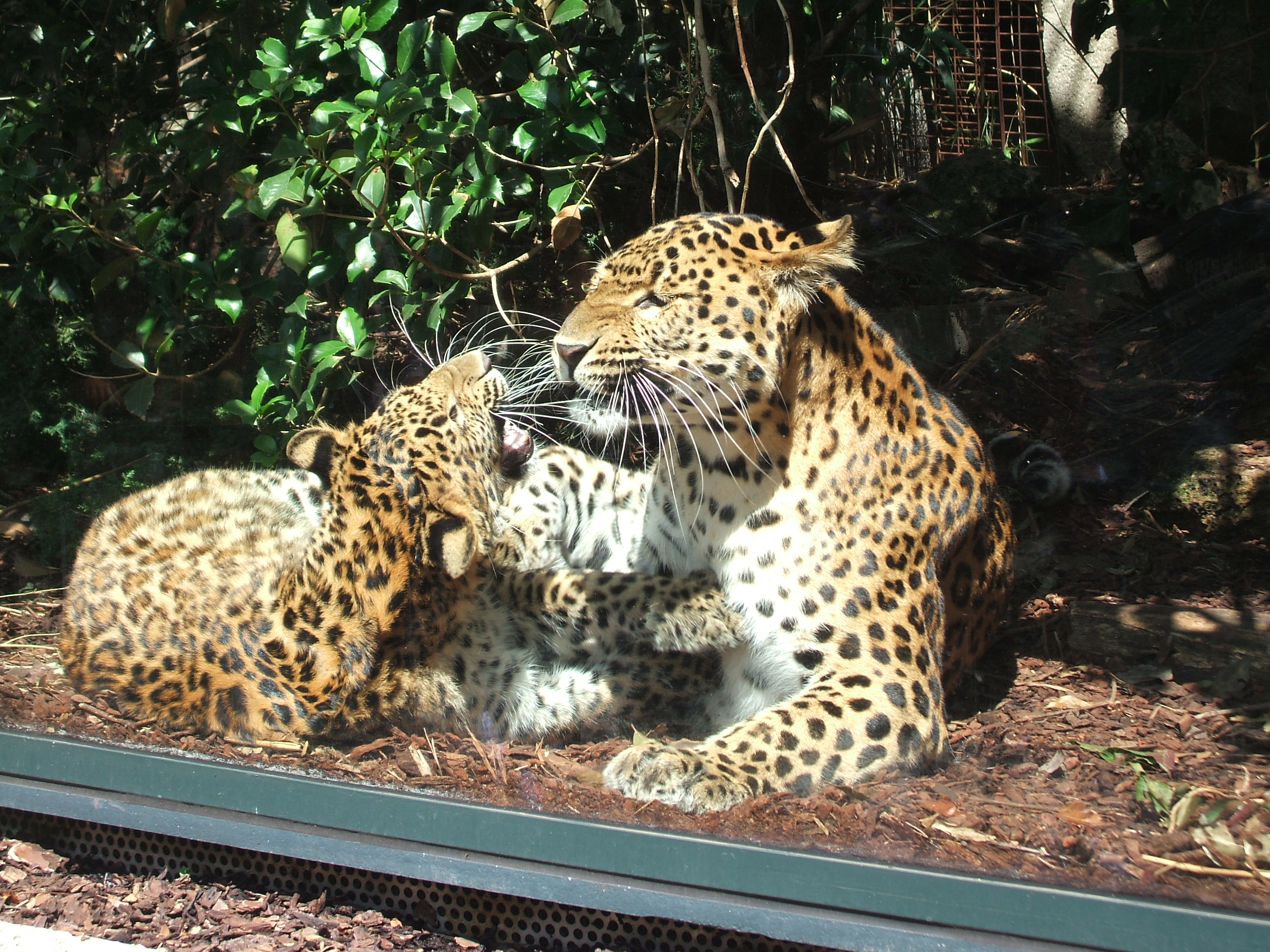
Amur leopards in the Menagerie

The Menagerie is the second-oldest public zoo in the world still in operation, following the Tiergarten Schönbrunn in Vienna founded in 1752. It occupies the northeast side of the garden along the Quai St. Bernard, covering 5 hectares (12 acres). It was created between 1798 and 1836 as a home for the animals of the royal menagerie at Versailles, which were largely abandoned after the French Revolution. Its architecture features picturesque "fabriques", or pavilions, mostly created in the 19th century, to shelter the animals. In the 20th century the larger animals were moved to the Paris Zoological Park, a more extensive site in the Bois de Vincennes. also governed by the MNHN. The menagerie is currently home to about six hundred mammals, birds, reptiles, amphibians and invertebrates, representing about 189 species. These include the Amur leopard, one of the rarest cats on earth.

== Mission and organisation ==
The MNHN has as its mission both research (fundamental and applied) and public diffusion of knowledge. It is organised into seven research and three diffusion departments.

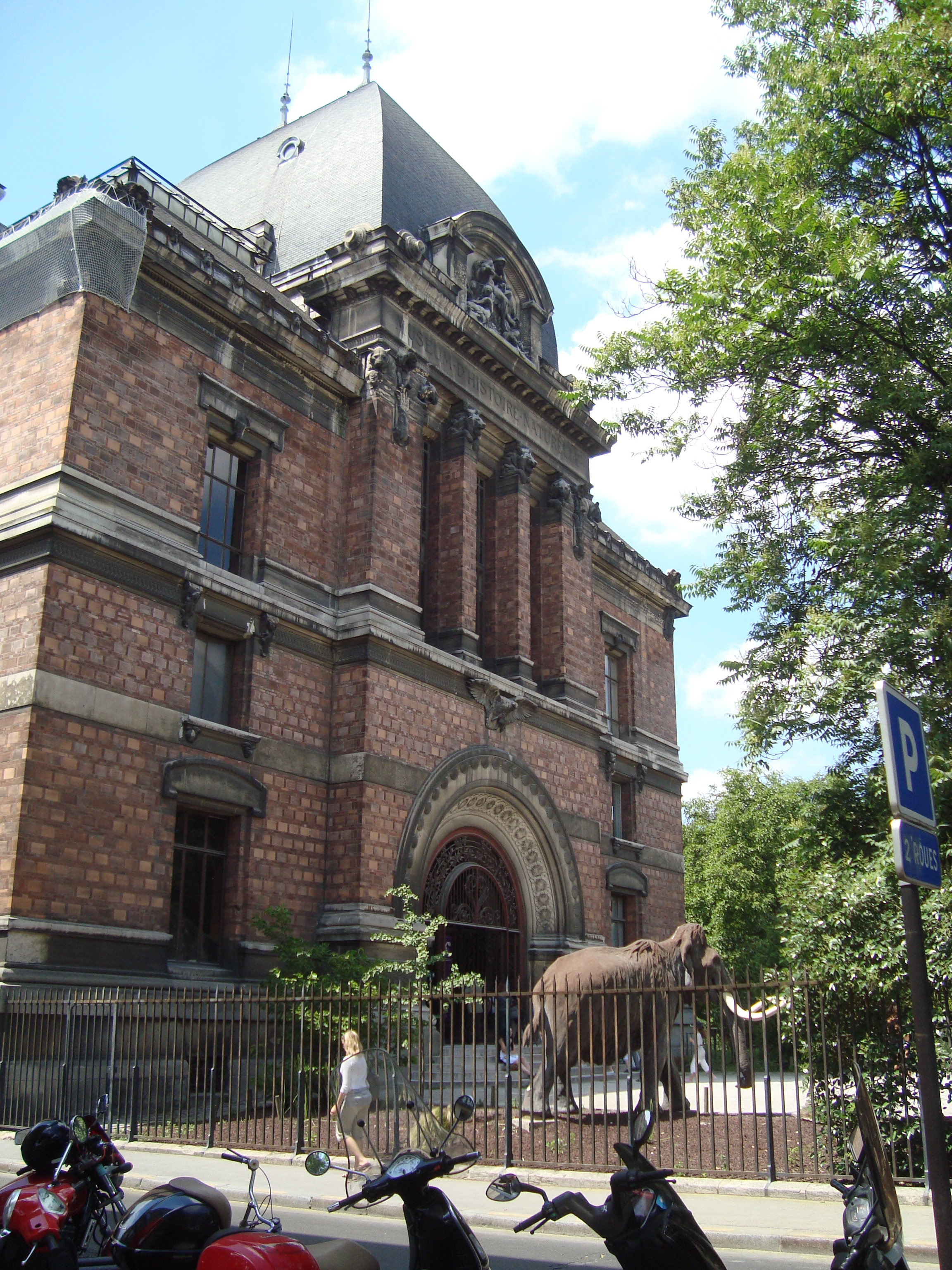
Main façade of the Gallery of Palaeontology and Comparative Anatomy.

The research departments are:

- Classification and Evolution
- Regulation, Development, and Molecular Diversity
- Aquatic Environments and Populations
- Ecology and Biodiversity Management
- History of Earth
- Men, Nature, and Societies, and
- Prehistory

The diffusion departments are:

- The Galleries of the Jardin des Plantes
- Botanical Parks and Zoos, and
- The Museum of Man (Musée de l'Homme)

The museum also developed higher education, and now delivers a master's degree.

== Location and branches ==
The MNHN comprises fourteen sites throughout France with four in Paris, including the Jardin des Plantes in the 5th arrondissement (métro Place Monge).

The herbarium of the MNHN, referred to by code P, includes a large number of important collections amongst its 8 000 000 plant specimens. The historical collections incorporated into the herbarium, each with its P prefix, include those of Jean-Baptiste de Lamarck (P-LA) René Louiche Desfontaines (P-Desf.), Joseph Pitton de Tournefort and Charles Plumier (P-TRF). The designation at CITES is FR 75A. It publishes the botanical periodical Adansonia and journals on the flora of New Caledonia, Madagascar, Comoro Islands, Cambodia, Laos, Vietnam, Cameroon, and Gabon.

The Musée de l'Homme is also in Paris, in the 16th arrondissement (métro Trocadéro). It houses displays in ethnography and physical anthropology, including artefacts, fossils, and other objects.

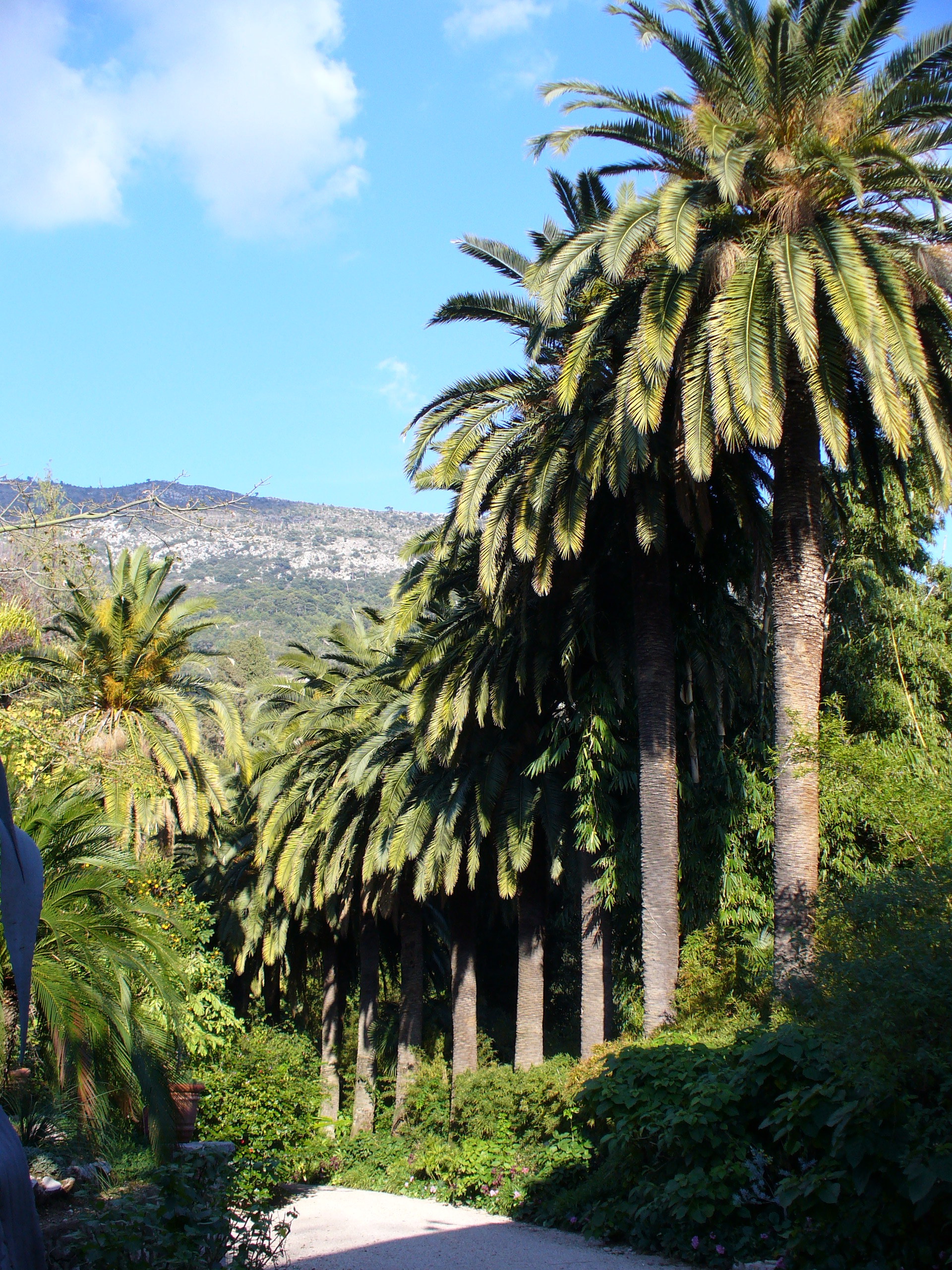
Allée of palms in the Jardin botanique exotique de Menton

Also part of the MNHN are:

- Three zoos, the Paris Zoological Park (Parc zoologique de Paris, also known as the Zoo de Vincennes), at the Bois de Vincennes in the 12th arrondissement, the Cleres Zoological Park (Parc zoologique de Clères), at a medieval manor in Clères (Seine-Maritime) and the Haute Touche Zoological Park in Obterre (Indre), the largest in France,
- Three botanical parks, the Arboretum de Chèvreloup in Rocquencourt next to the Château de Versailles, the Jardin botanique exotique de Menton and the Jardin alpin de La Jaÿsinia in Samoëns,
- Two museums, the Musée de l'abri Pataud in Les Eyzies-de-Tayac and the Harmas de Fabre in Sérignan-du-Comtat,
- Four scientific sites, the Institut de Paléontologie humaine in Paris, the Centre d'Écologie générale de Brunoy, the Station de Biologie marine et Marinarium de Concarneau and the CRESCO (Centre de Recherche et d'Enseignement sur les Systèmes Côtiers) in Dinard.

== Chairs ==
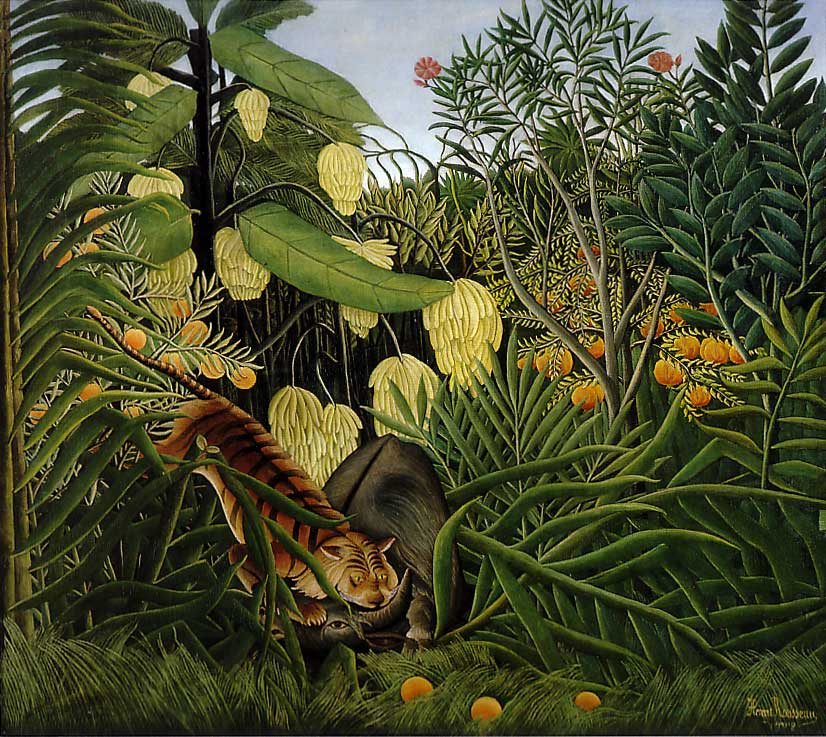
Dreamlike paintings of Henri Rousseau were inspired by visits to the Jardin des Plantes

The transformation of the Jardin ('Garden') from the medicinal garden of the king to a national public museum of natural history required the creation of twelve chaired positions. Over the ensuing years the number of Chairs and their subject areas evolved, some being subdivided into two positions and others removed. The list of Chairs of the MNHN includes major figures in the history of the Natural sciences. Early chaired positions were held by Jean-Baptiste Lamarck, René Desfontaines, and Georges Cuvier, and later occupied by Paul Rivet, Léon Vaillant, and others.

== In popular culture ==
In Jules Verne's 1870 novel, 20,000 Leagues Under The Sea, the story is written in the form of narration from journal entries by Professor Pierre Aronnax, a naturalist from the Paris Museum of Natural History (the name of the museum at the time).

The Gallery of Palaeontology and Comparative Anatomy and other parts of Jardin des Plantes was a source of inspiration for French graphic novelist Jacques Tardi. The gallery appears on the first page and several subsequent pages of Adèle et la bête (Adèle and the Beast; 1976), the first album in the series of Les Aventures extraordinaires d'Adèle Blanc-Sec. The story opens with a 136-million-year-old pterodactyl egg hatching, and a live pterodactyl escaping through the gallery glass roof, wreaking havoc and killing people in Paris. The Gallery of Palaeontology and Comparative Anatomy returned the favour by placing a life size cardboard cutout of Adèle and the hatching pterodactyl in a glass cabinet outside the main entrance on the top floor balcony.

The Pulitzer Prize–winning novel All the Light We Cannot See, by Anthony Doerr, partially takes place at the MNHN; the father of the protagonist Marie-Laure works as the chief locksmith of the museum. The story also makes many references to Jules Verne's novel 20,000 Leagues Under the Seas, and the fictional naturalist and narrator Professor Pierre Aronnax. Marie-Laure was gifted braille books of the novel by her father.

== Directors of the MNHN ==
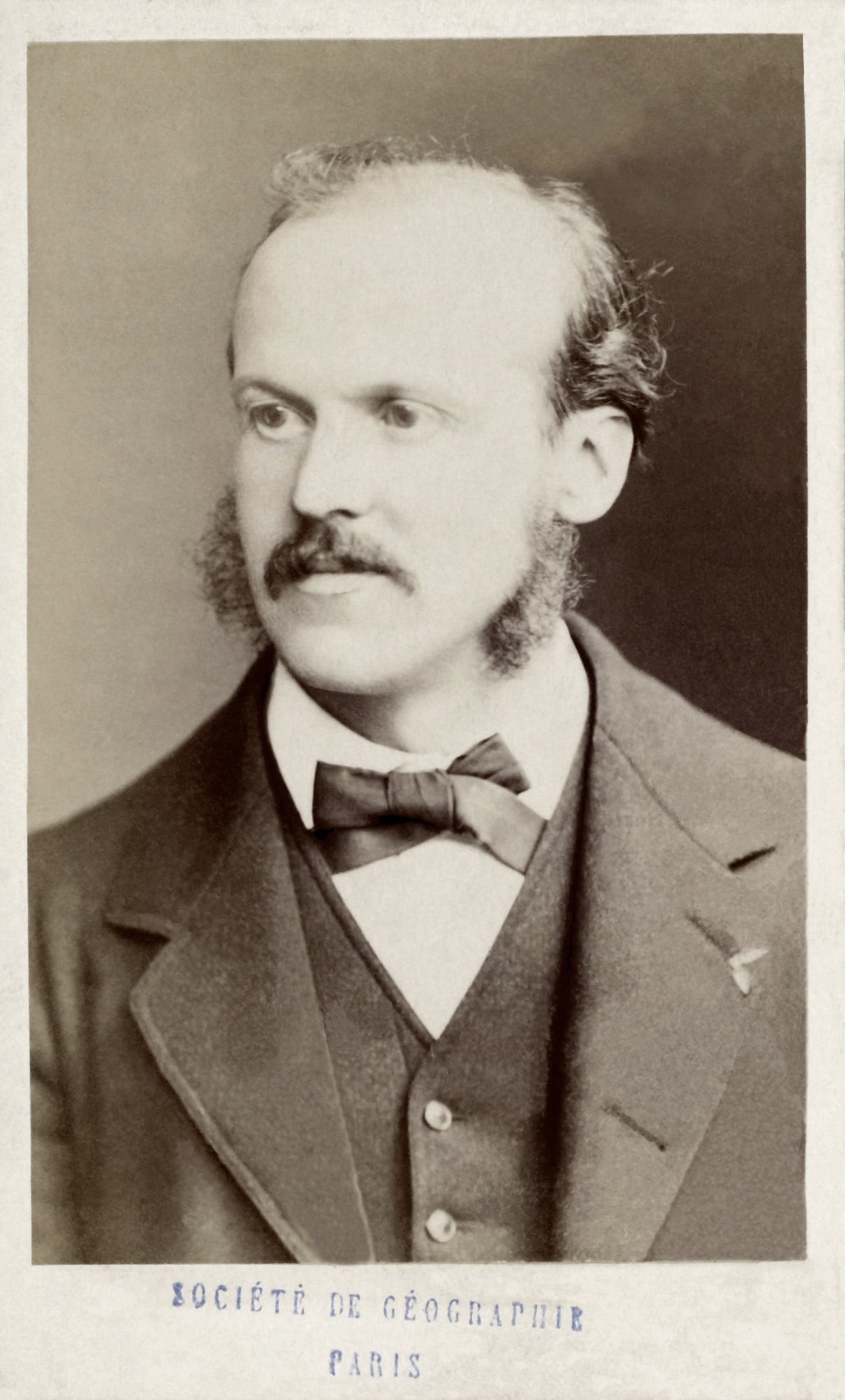
Alphonse Milne-Edwards, director of the museum at the end of the 19th century.

Directors elected for one year:

- 1793–1794: Louis Jean-Marie Daubenton
- 1794–1795: Antoine-Laurent de Jussieu
- 1795–1796: Bernard Germain Étienne de Laville-sur-Illon, comte de Lacépède
- 1796–1797: Louis Jean-Marie Daubenton
- 1797–1798: Louis Jean-Marie Daubenton
- 1798–1799: Antoine-Laurent de Jussieu
- 1799–1800: Antoine-Laurent de Jussieu

Directors elected for two years:

- 1800–1801: Antoine-François Fourcroy
- 1802–1803: René Desfontaines
- 1804–1805: Antoine-François Fourcroy
- 1806–1807: René Desfontaines
- 1808–1809: Georges Cuvier
- 1810–1811: René Desfontaines
- 1812–1813: André Laugier
- 1814–1815: André Thouin
- 1816–1817: André Thouin
- 1818–1819: André Laugier
- 1820–1821: René Desfontaines
- 1822–1823: Georges Cuvier
- 1824–1825: Louis Cordier
- 1826–1827: Georges Cuvier
- 1828–1829: René Desfontaines
- 1830–1831: Georges Cuvier
- 1832–1833: Louis Cordier
- 1834–1835: Adrien de Jussieu
- 1836–1837: Michel Eugène Chevreul
- 1838–1839: Louis Cordier
- 1840–1841: Michel Eugène Chevreul
- 1842–1843: Adrien de Jussieu
- 1844–1845: Michel Eugène Chevreul
- 1846–1847: Adolphe Brongniart
- 1848–1849: Adrien de Jussieu
- 1850–1851: Michel Eugène Chevreul
- 1852–1853: André Marie Constant Duméril
- 1854–1855: Michel Eugène Chevreul
- 1856–1857: Marie Jean Pierre Flourens
- 1858–1859: Michel Eugène Chevreul
- 1860–1861: Isidore Geoffroy Saint-Hilaire
- 1862–1863: Michel Eugène Chevreul

Directors elected for five years:

- 1863–1879: Michel Eugène Chevreul
- 1879–1891: Edmond Frémy
- 1891–1900: Alphonse Milne-Edwards
- 1900–1919: Edmond Perrier
- 1919–1931: Louis Mangin
- 1932–1936: Paul Lemoine
- 1936–1942: Louis Germain
- 1942–1949: Achille Urbain
- 1950: René Jeannel
- 1951–1965: Roger Heim
- 1966–1970: Maurice Fontaine
- 1971–1975: Yves Le Grand
- 1976–1985: Jean Dorst
- 1985–1990: Philippe Taquet
- 1994–1999: Henry de Lumley

Presidents elected for five years:

- 2002–2006: Bernard Chevassus-au-Louis
- 2006–2008: André Menez (deceased in February 2008)
- 2009–2015: Gilles Boeuf
- 2015–2023: Bruno David
- 2023–present: Gilles Bloch

== Friends ==
The Friends of the Natural History Museum Paris is a private organisation that provides financial support for the MNHN, its branches and the Jardin des Plantes. Membership includes free entry to all galleries of the museum and the botanical garden. The Friends have assisted the museum with many purchases for its collections over the years, as well as funds for scientific and structural development.

== Pictures gallery ==
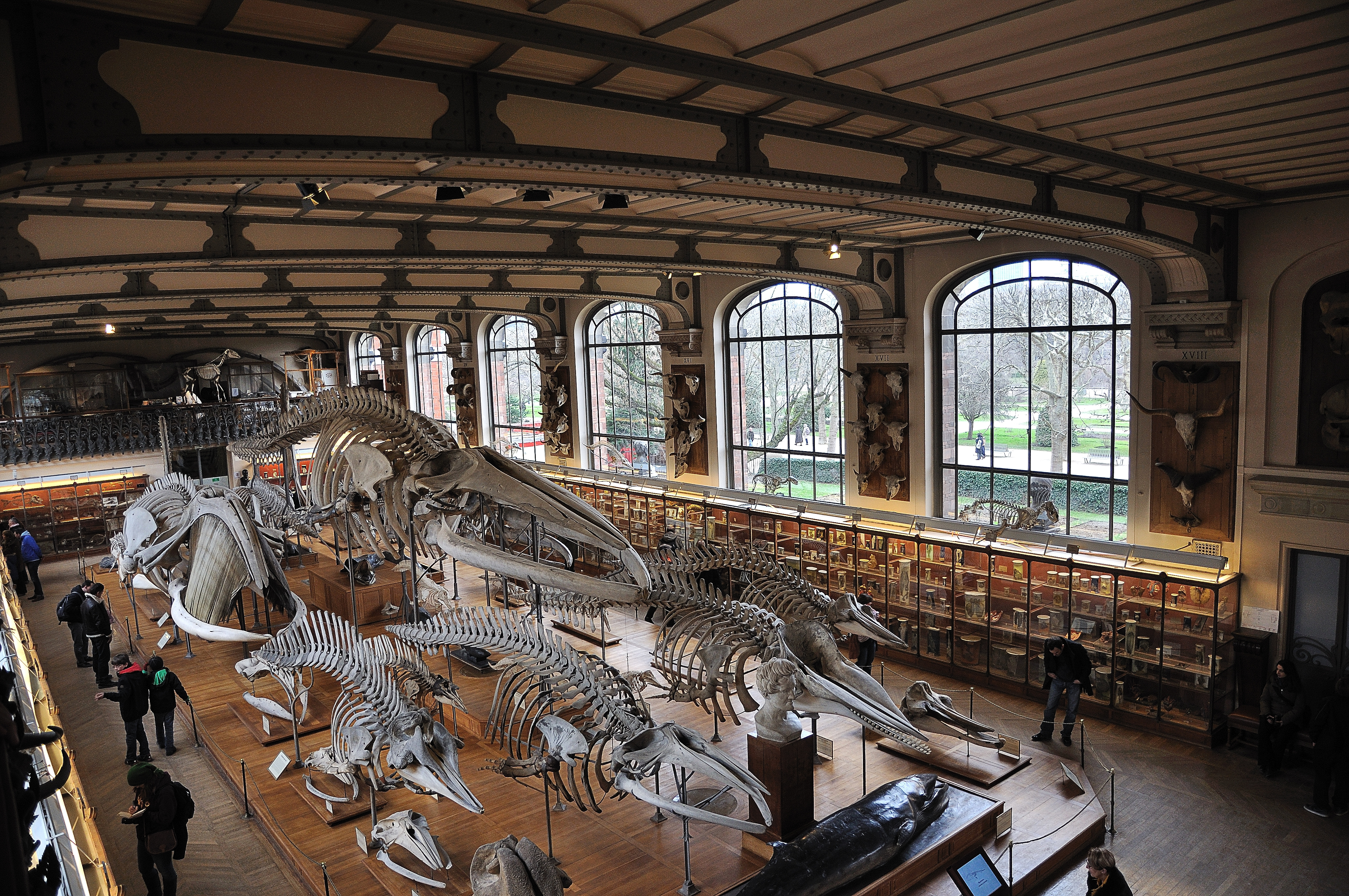
A)

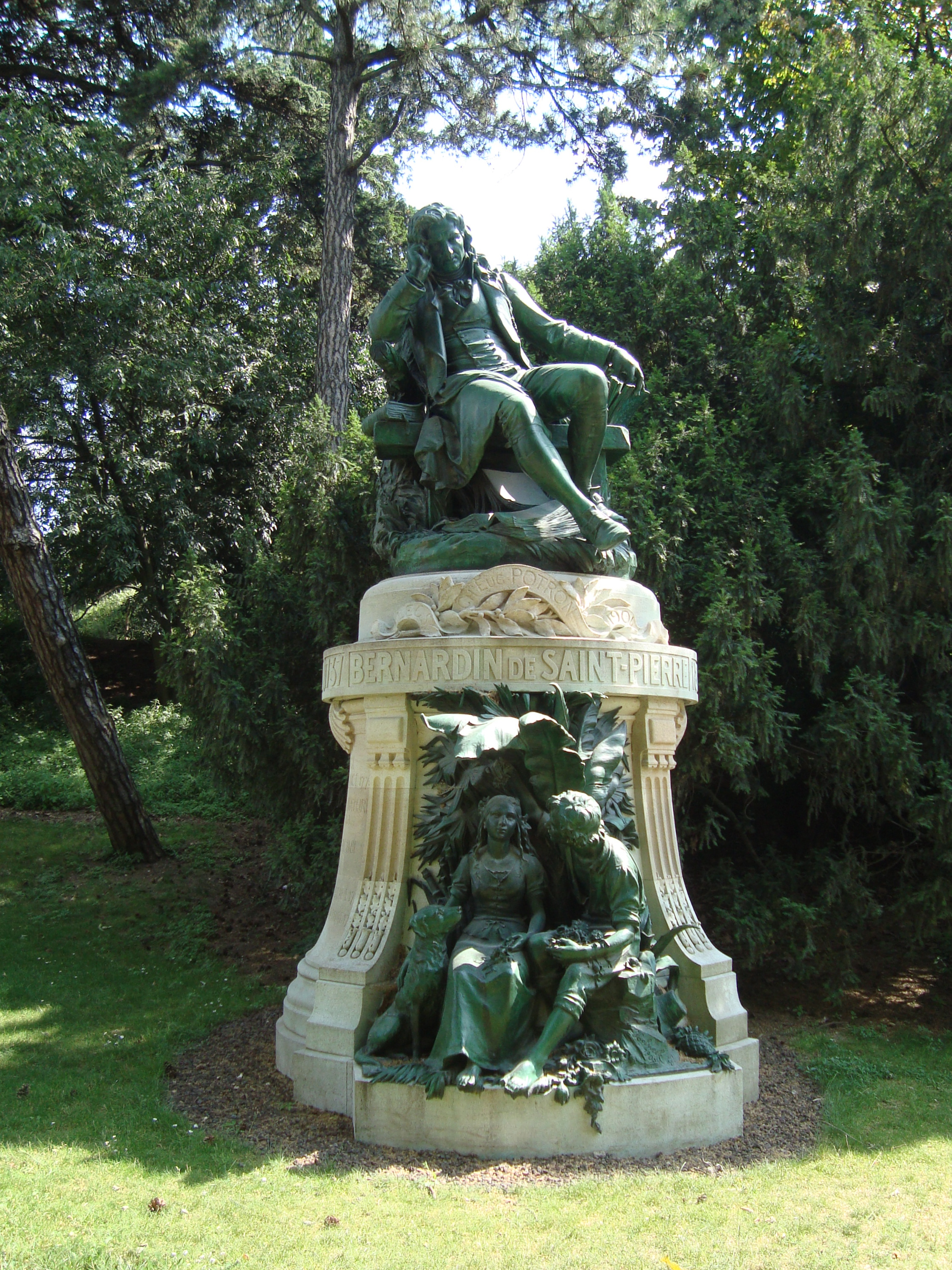
B)

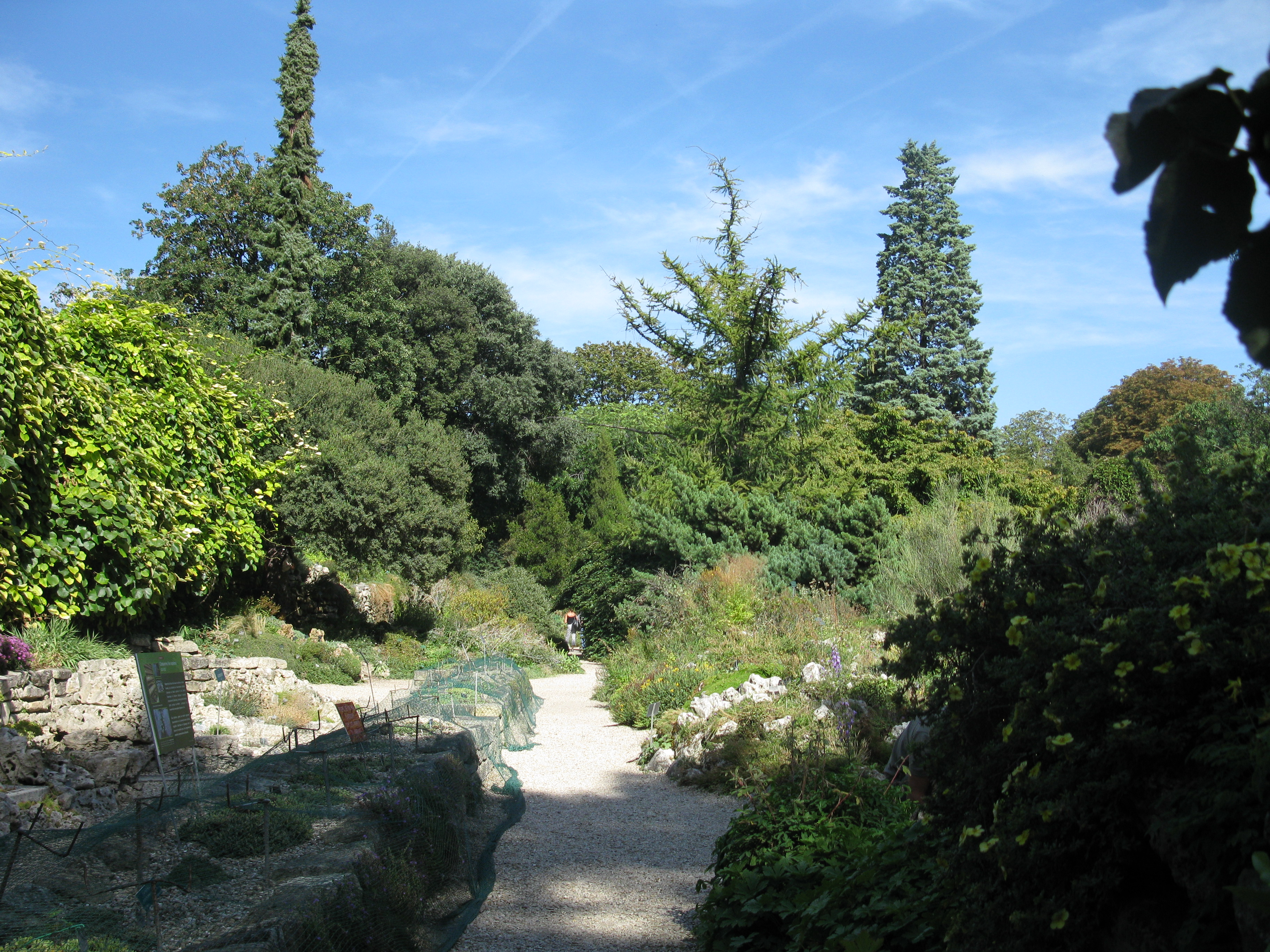
C)

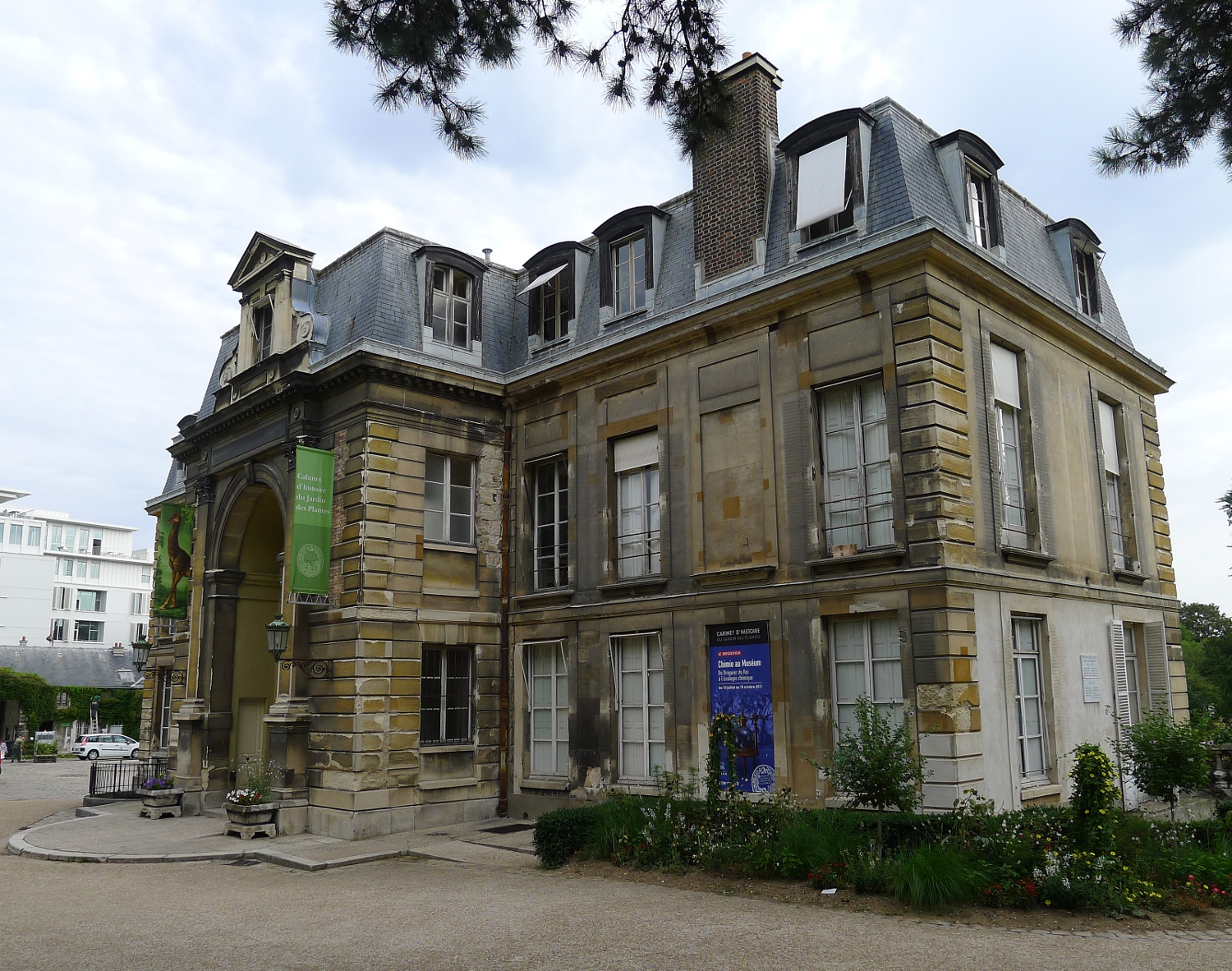
D)

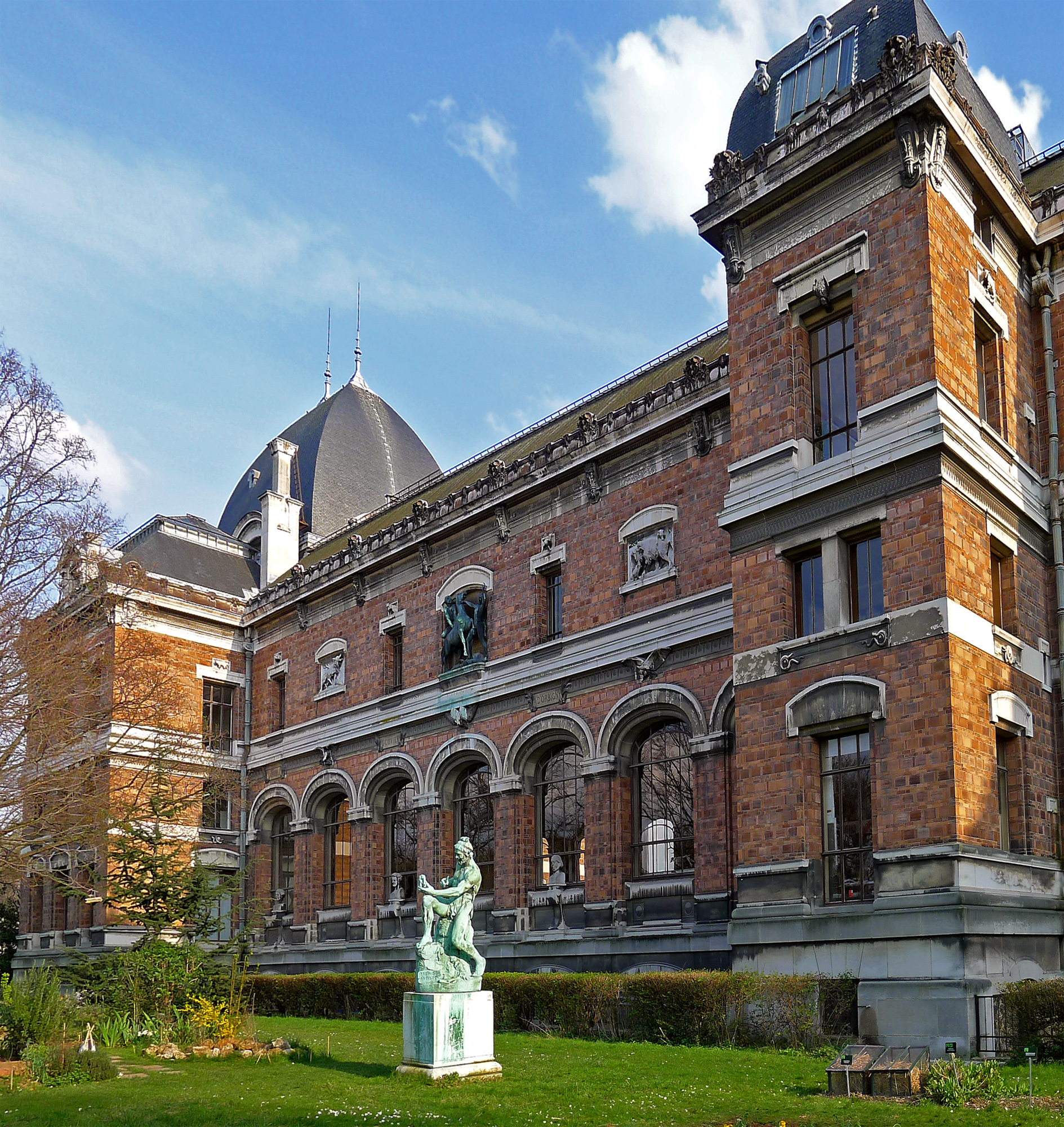
E)

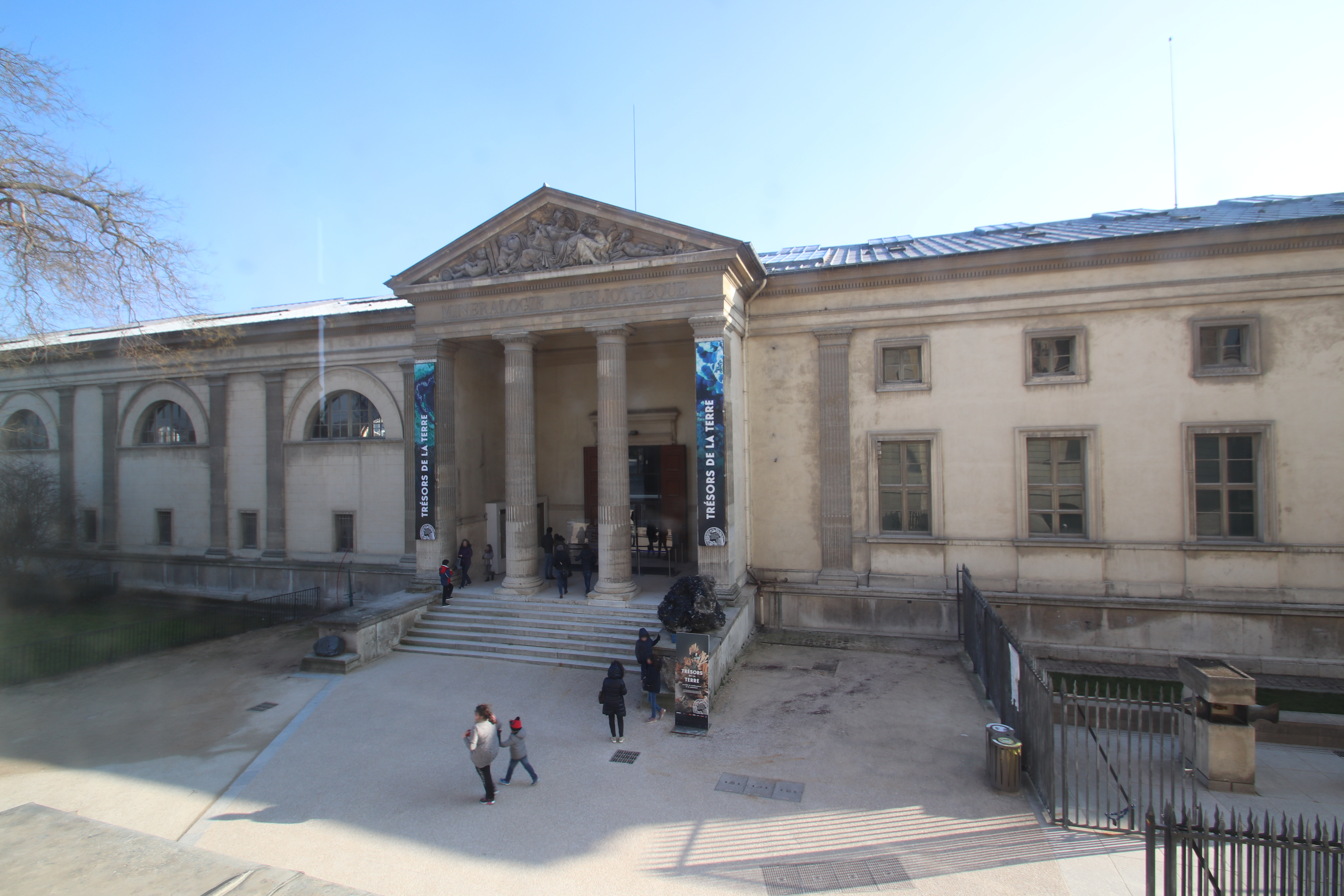
F)

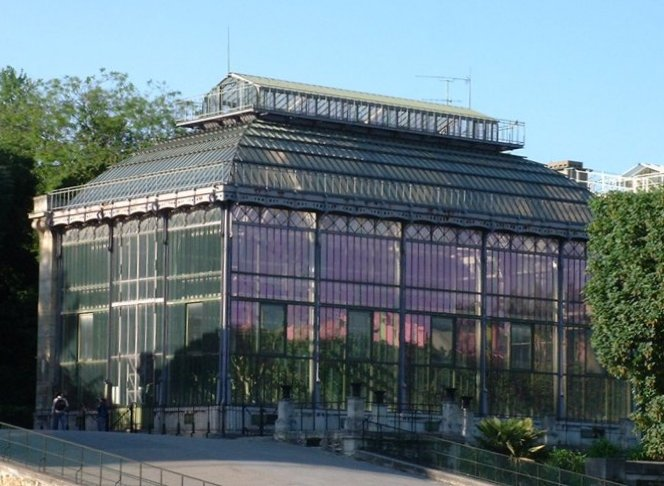
G)

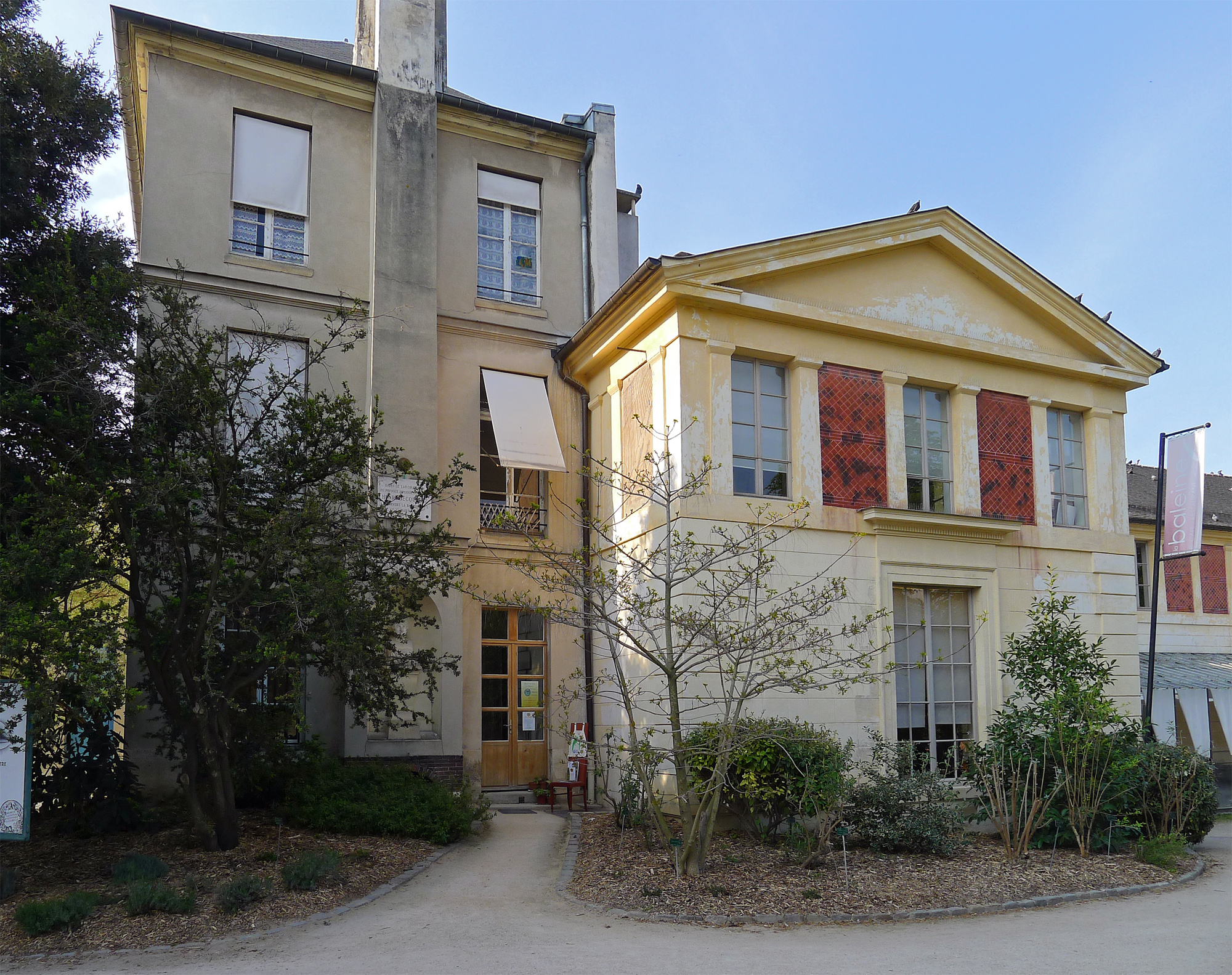
H)

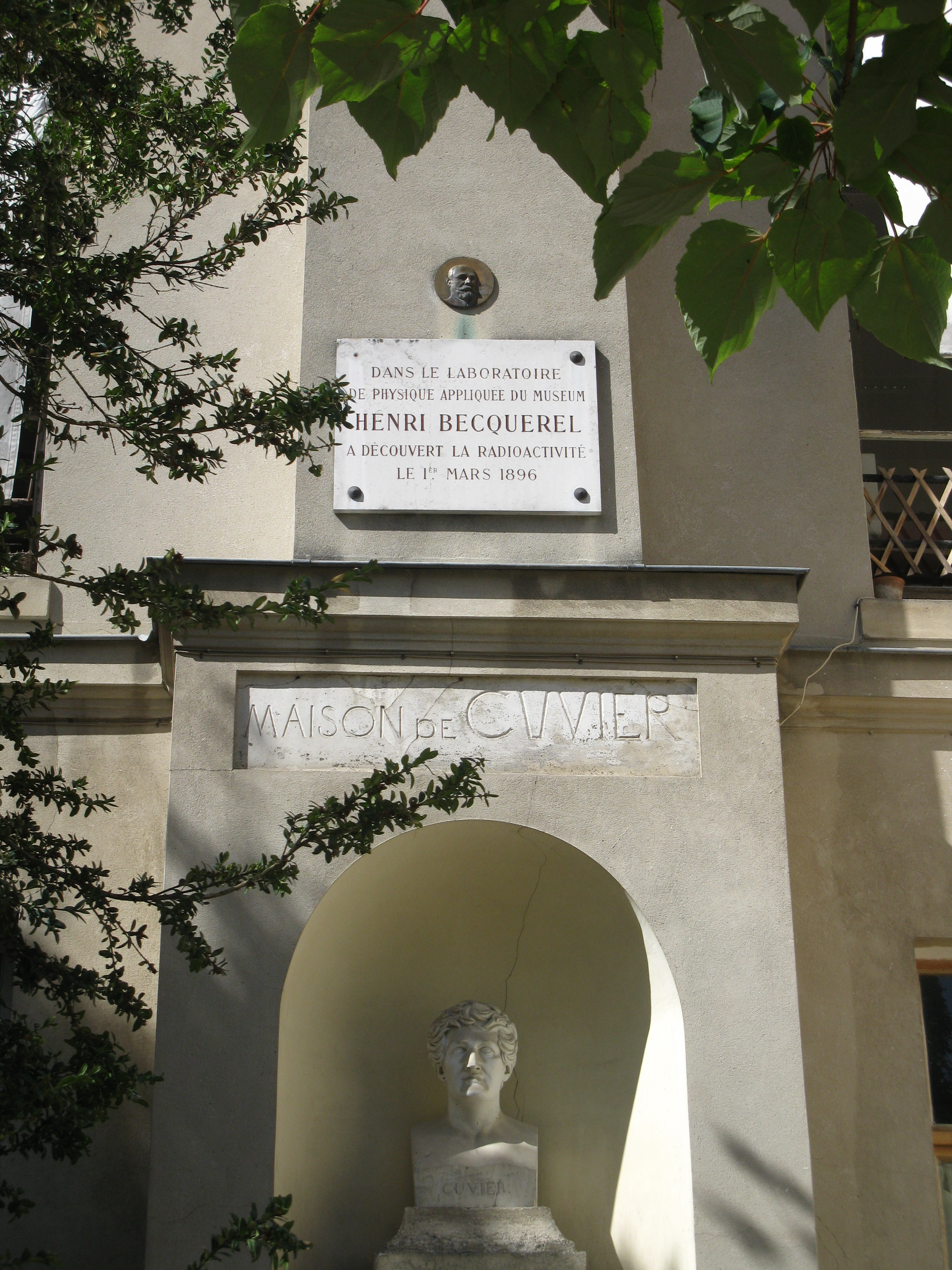
I)

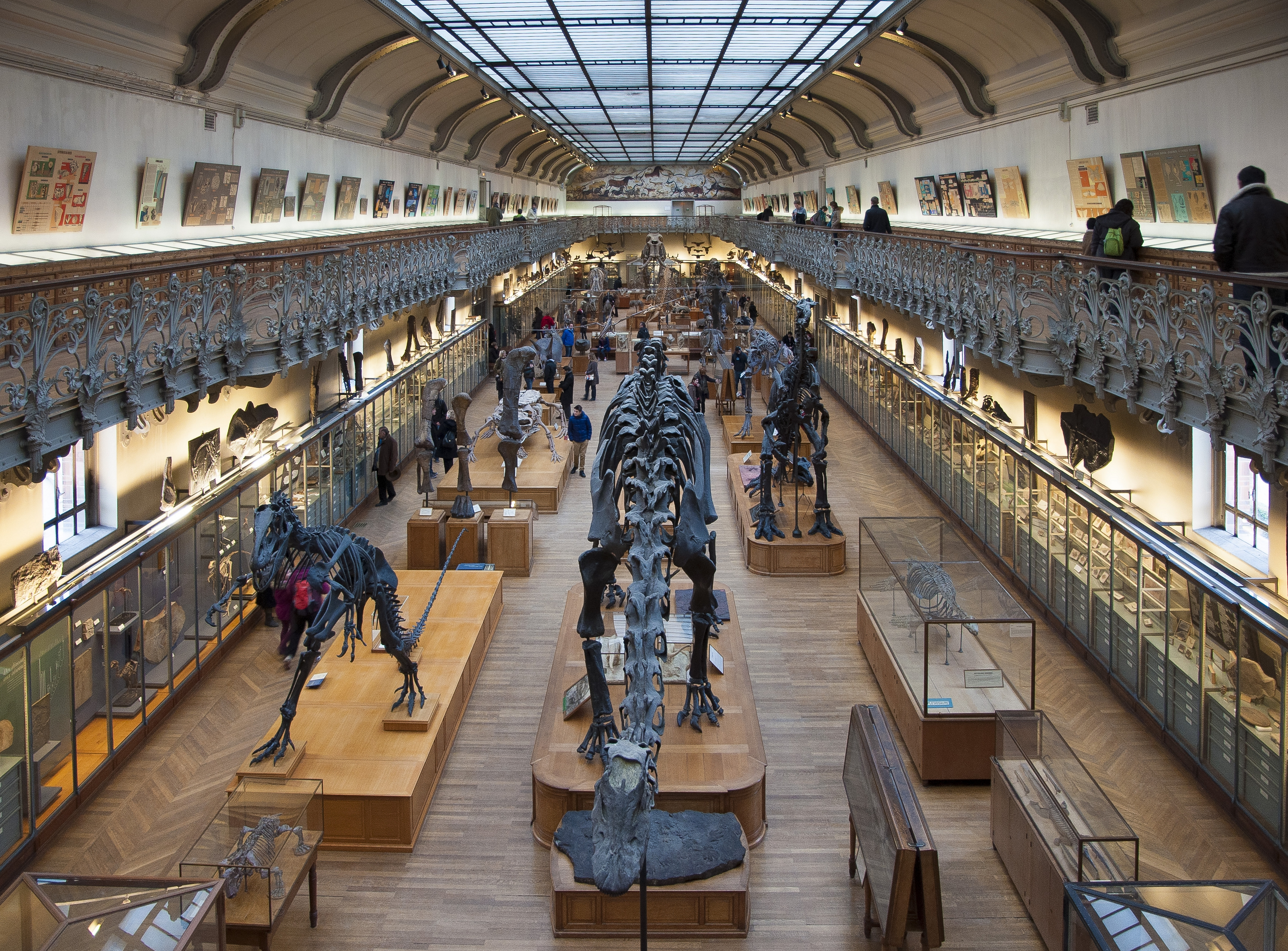
J)

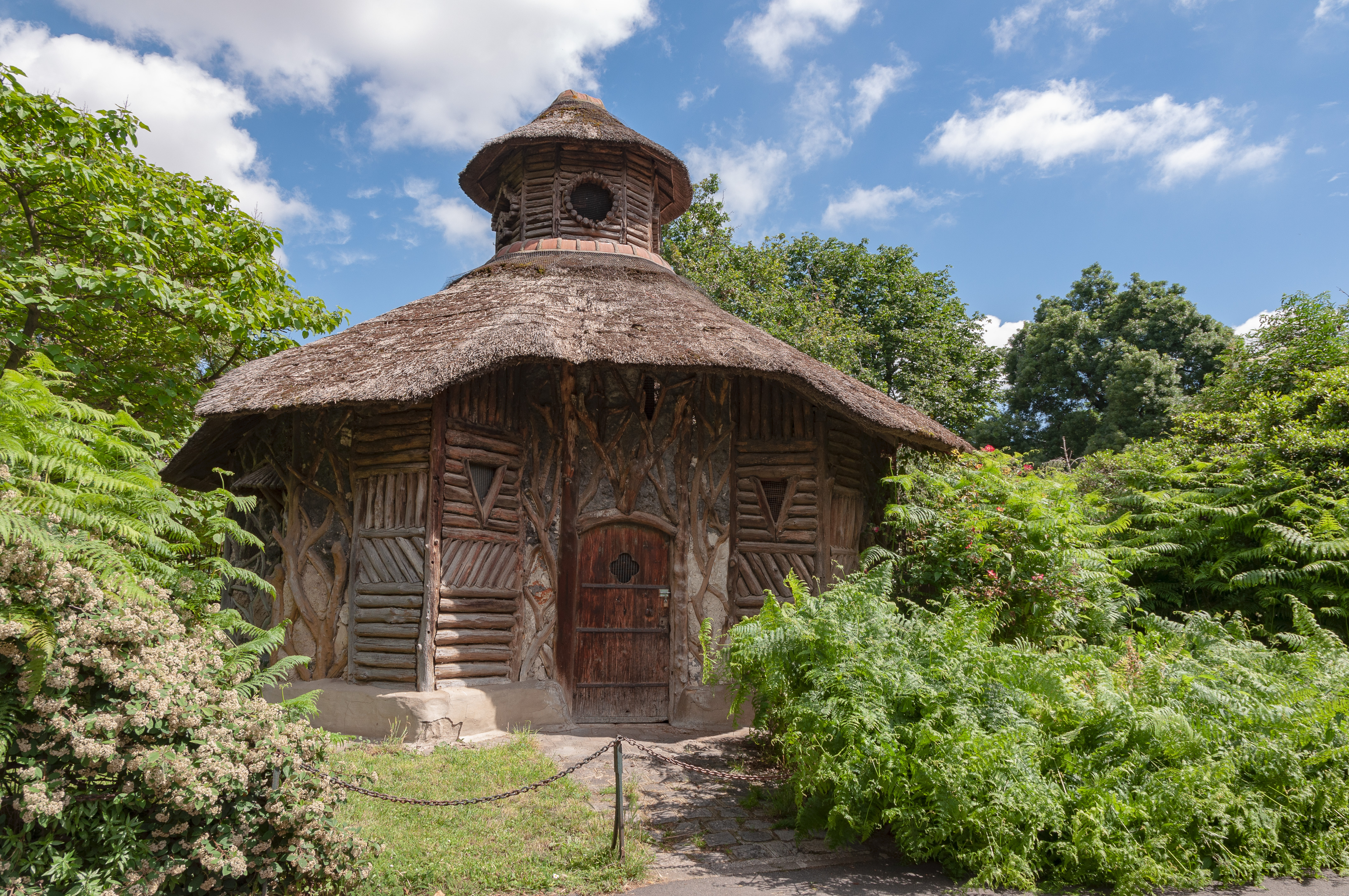
K)

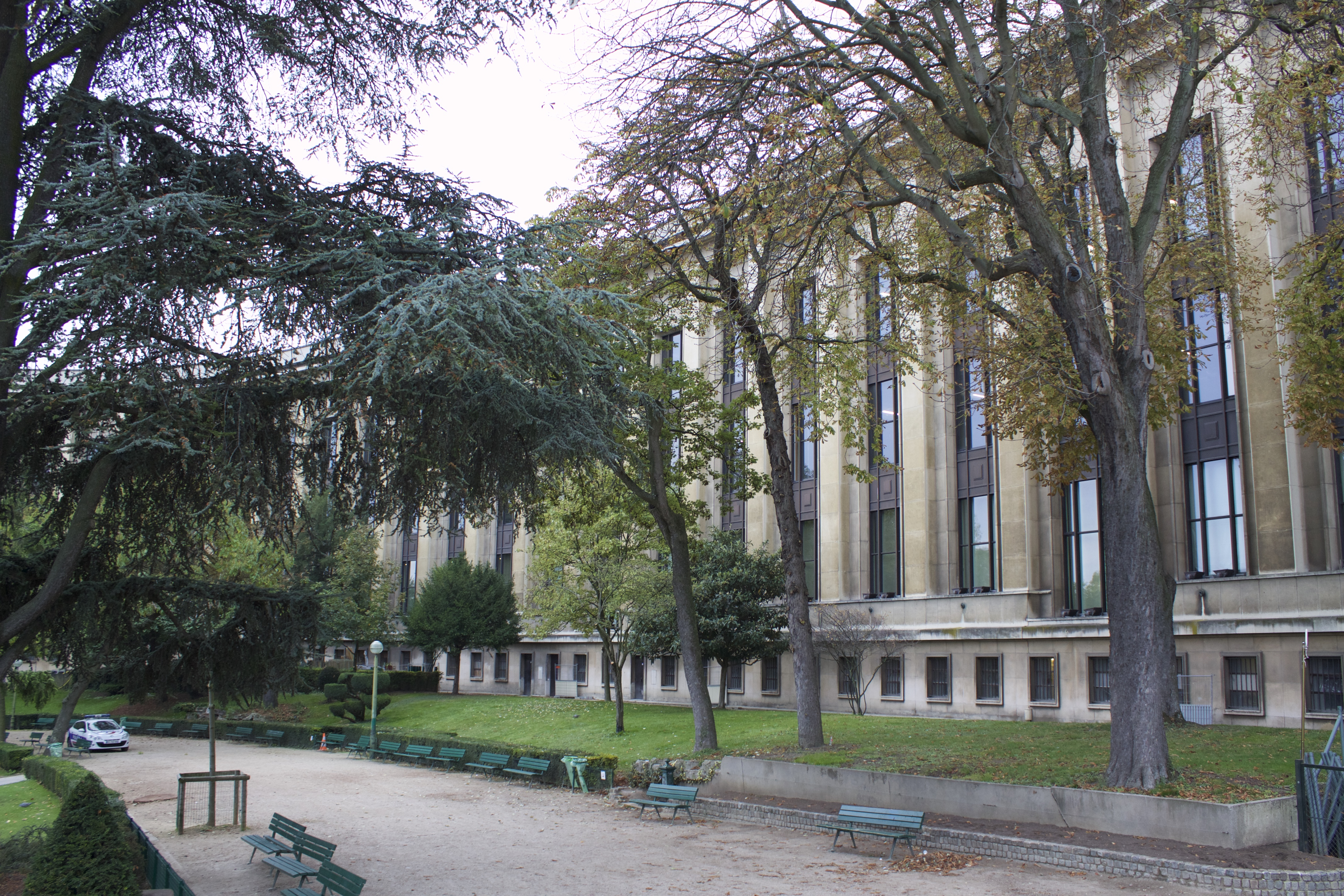
L)

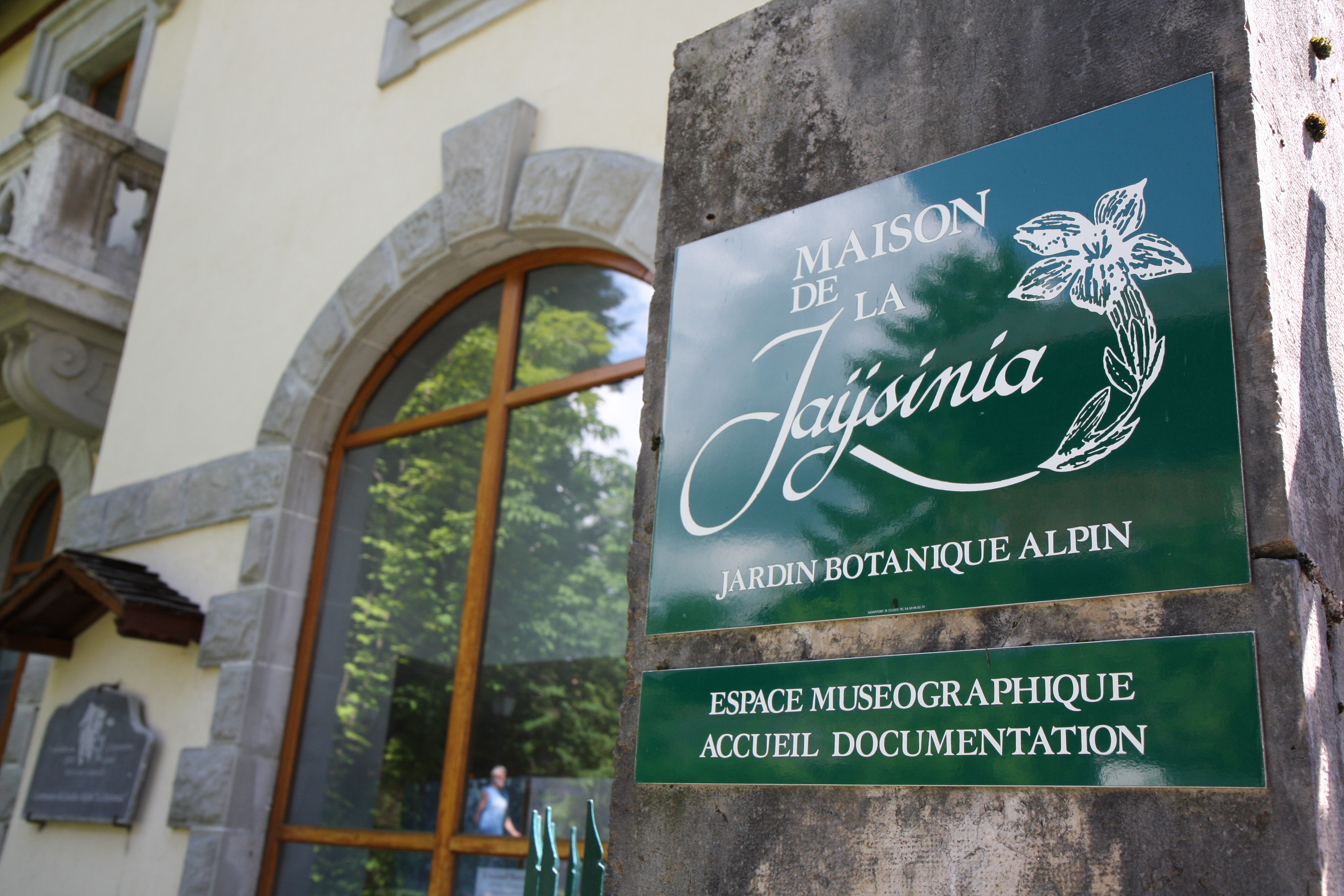
M)

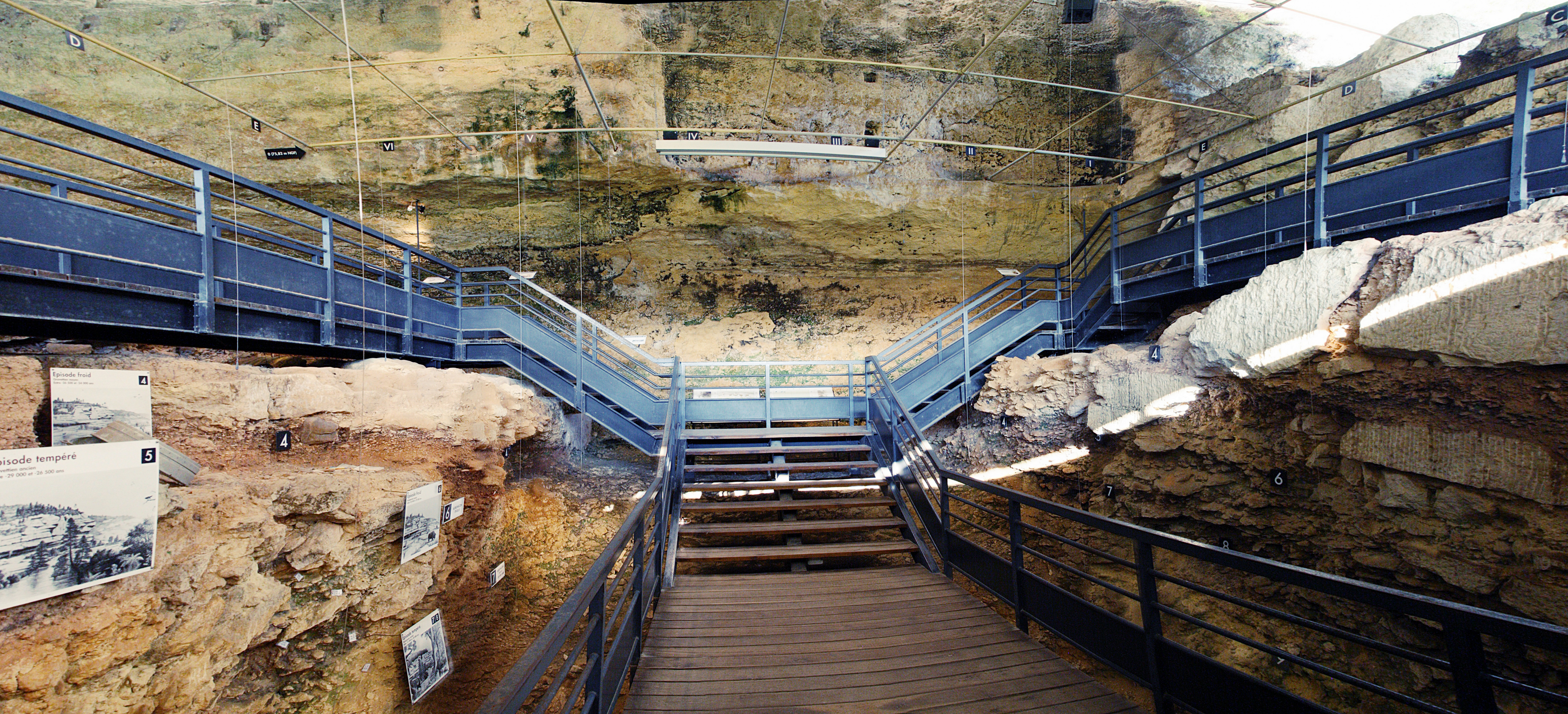
N)

captions:

A) The cetaceum (podium of cetaceans), in the Comparative Anatomy gallery
B) Statue of Bernardin de Saint-Pierre, with Paul and Virginia
C) The alpine garden
D) The Hôtel de Magny
E) The gallery of Palaeontology and Comparative Anatomy, with the statue of the First Artist by Paul Richer
F) The Gallery of Mineralogy and Geology
G) The greenhouse of New Caledonia built between 1834 and 1836 (at the time the "oriental pavilion") according to the plans of Charles Rohault de Fleury
H) Cuvier's house on the left and the triangular pediment of the east wing of the Whale Pavilion on the right
I) The Becquerel alley, north side, leads to Cuvier's house where Henri Becquerel discovered radioactivity in 1896 J) The Palaeontology gallery, on the second floor, with its mezzanine. The second floor exhibits the vertebrate fossils and the mezzanine the invertebrate fossils
K) One of the zoological shelters of the menagerie
L The façade of the Musée de l'Homme, in the southwest wing of the Palais de Chaillot
M The botanical museum of La Jaÿsinia, in the Alps
N The excavations of the Pataud shelter, in Dordogne
.

== See also ==
- List of museums in Paris
- List of tourist attractions in Paris

== Bibliography (in French) ==
- Deligeorges, Stephane; Gady, Alexandre; Labalette, Françoise (2004). Le Jardin des Plantes et le Muséum national d'histoire naturelle (in French). Éditions du Patrimoine- Centre des Monuments Nationaux. ISBN 978-2-85822-601-6.
