= Arboretum de Chèvreloup =

French arboretum in the Île-de-France

Coordinates: 48°49′49″N 2°06′42″E

Chèvreloup Arboretum
- Arboretum de Chèvreloup
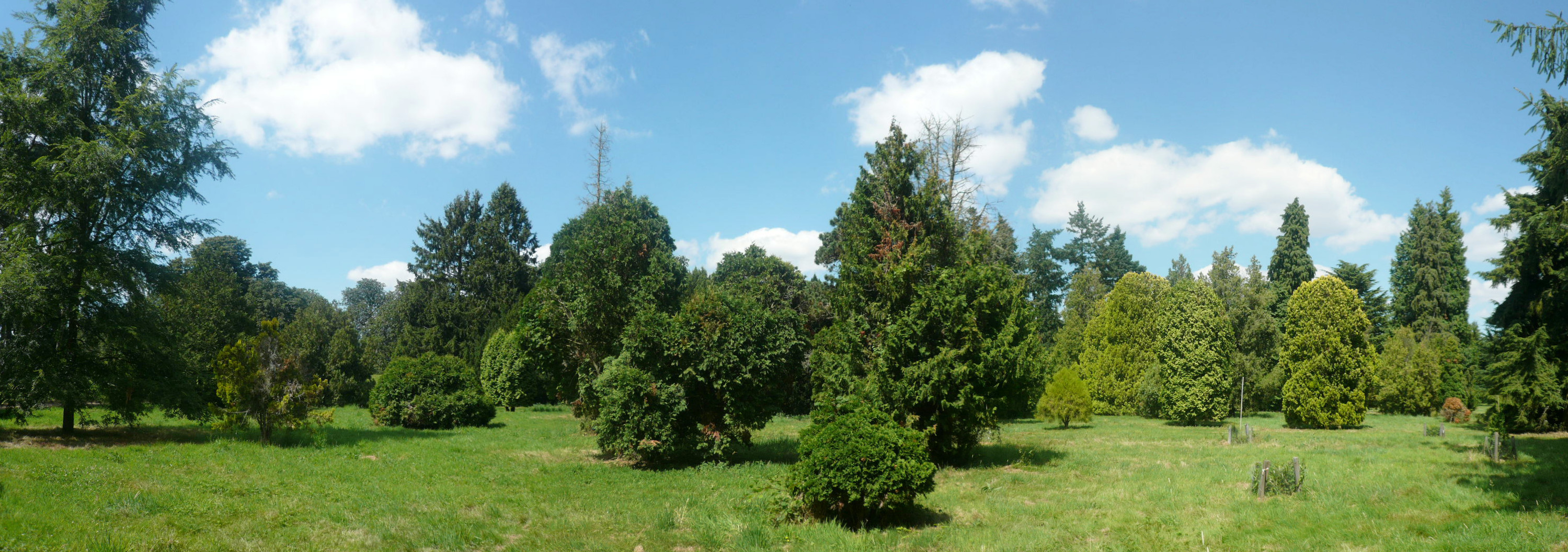
- Garden
- Location: Rocquencourt, France
- Type: arboretum

Muséum national d'histoire naturelle network
- Muséum national d'histoire naturelle; Jardin des Plantes; Musée de l'Homme; Ménagerie du Jardin des Plantes; Brunoy Ecology Research Centre; Chèvreloup Arboretum; Jardin botanique exotique de Menton; Marinarium Concarneau Marine Biology Station; Paris Zoological Park (Vincennes Zoo); Cleres Zoological Park; Research and Education Centre on Coastal Systems; Haute Touche Zoological Park; Jaysinia Alpine Garden; Abri Pataud Prehistoric Museum; L’Harmas de Fabre

The Arboretum de Versailles-Chèvreloup (French pronunciation: [aʁbɔʁetɔm də vɛʁsɑj ʃɛvʁəlu]; 200 hectares) is a major arboretum located just north of the Palace of Versailles at 30, route de Versailles, Rocquencourt, Yvelines, Île-de-France, France. It forms part of the Muséum national d'histoire naturelle, and is open everyday in the warmer months; an admission fee is charged.

== History ==
The site dates to 1699 when Louis XIV acquired the hamlet of Chèvreloup, demolishing its walls to extend his hunting ground around his castle. During the 18th century, botanist Bernard de Jussieu (1699–1777) was a frequent visitor at Versailles, where in 1759 he created a botanical garden at the edge of Chèvreloup in today's Parc de Trianon; this garden was destroyed, however, upon the death of Louis XV. During the French Revolution, Chèvreloup was sold to private owners, then purchased by Napoleon in 1806. In the 19th century it became apparent that the Jardin des Plantes in Paris was too small for a national collection, and in 1922 the conservator of the Estate of Versailles and architect François-Benjamin Chaussemiche (1864–1945) established today's arboretum as the Jardin de Jussieu, annex to the National Museum of Natural History. In 1940, however, it was abandoned. Planting resumed in 1960, with parts of the arboretum opening to the public in 1977.

== Specimens ==
Today the arboretum contains about 15,000 specimens on 195 hectares, representing 124 families, 220 genera, 2700 species and varieties, and 500 cultivars. Its tropical plant collection alone maintains about 5,000 species in greenhouses. The arboretum proper is organized into three major sections:

- Systematic botany (50 hectares) - the oldest plantations, started in 1924, with trees grouped by family or genus. Collections include Abies, Crataegus, X Cupressocyparis, Cupressus, Juglans, Juniperus, Malus, Picea, Pinus, Prunus, Pyrus, Quercus, Sorbus, and Tilia.
- Geography (120 hectares) - begun in 1965, with species grouped according to their original natural range. These collections are divided into three areas - Europe, Asia, and the Americas - with representative holdings as follows: temperate Europe (220 species), the Caucasus (40 species), Himalayas and temperate China (500 species), Japan and Korea (460 species), North America (700 species for the USA), as well as species from the Mediterranean region, particularly from the Atlas Mountains. Most species are represented by six subjects planted within a circle of 25 meters diameter.
- Ornamental horticulture (25 hectares) - trees cultivars selected for their ornamental properties, including specimens created by grafting and cuttings.

Tree species best represented in the arboretum are Chamaecyparis (120 taxa), Prunus (115 taxa), Picea (100 taxa), Quercus (85 taxa), Abies (60 taxa), Sorbus (55 taxa), Crataegus (50 taxa), Fraxinus (45 taxa), Tilia (45 taxa), Viburnum (40 taxa), Cedrus (20 taxa), and Cupressocyparis (20 taxa).

The arboretum also participates in the conservation of rare and endangered species. At present it conserves 70 species from the list produced by the International Union for Conservation of Nature and Natural Resources (IUCN) and the BGCI (Botanic Gardens Conservation International), including Abies chensiensis, Abies nebrodensis, Malus sikkimensis, Picea obovata, Pinus bungeana, Prumnopitys andina, and Quercus dentata.

== See also ==
- List of botanical gardens in France
