= Hôtel de Ville, Le Chesnay =

Town hall in Le Chesnay, France

Hôtel de Ville
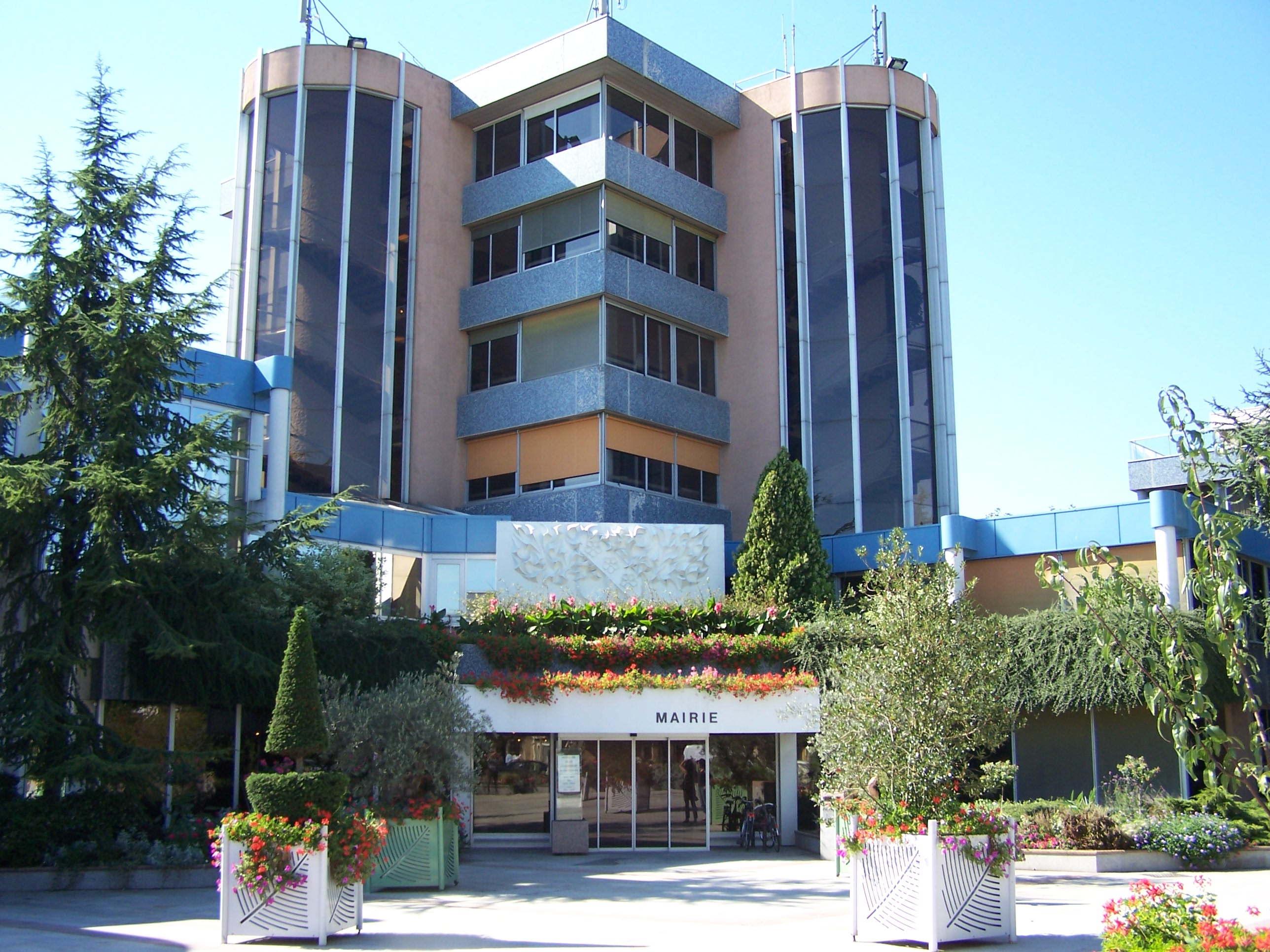
- The main frontage of the Hôtel de Ville in September 2006
- Interactive map of the Hôtel de Ville area

General information
- Type: City hall
- Architectural style: Modern style
- Location: Le Chesnay, France
- Coordinates: 48.8265°N 2.1253°E
- Completed: 1980

The Hôtel de Ville (French pronunciation: [otɛl də vil], City Hall) is a municipal building in Le Chesnay, Yvelines, in the western suburbs of Paris, standing on Rue Pottier.

== History ==
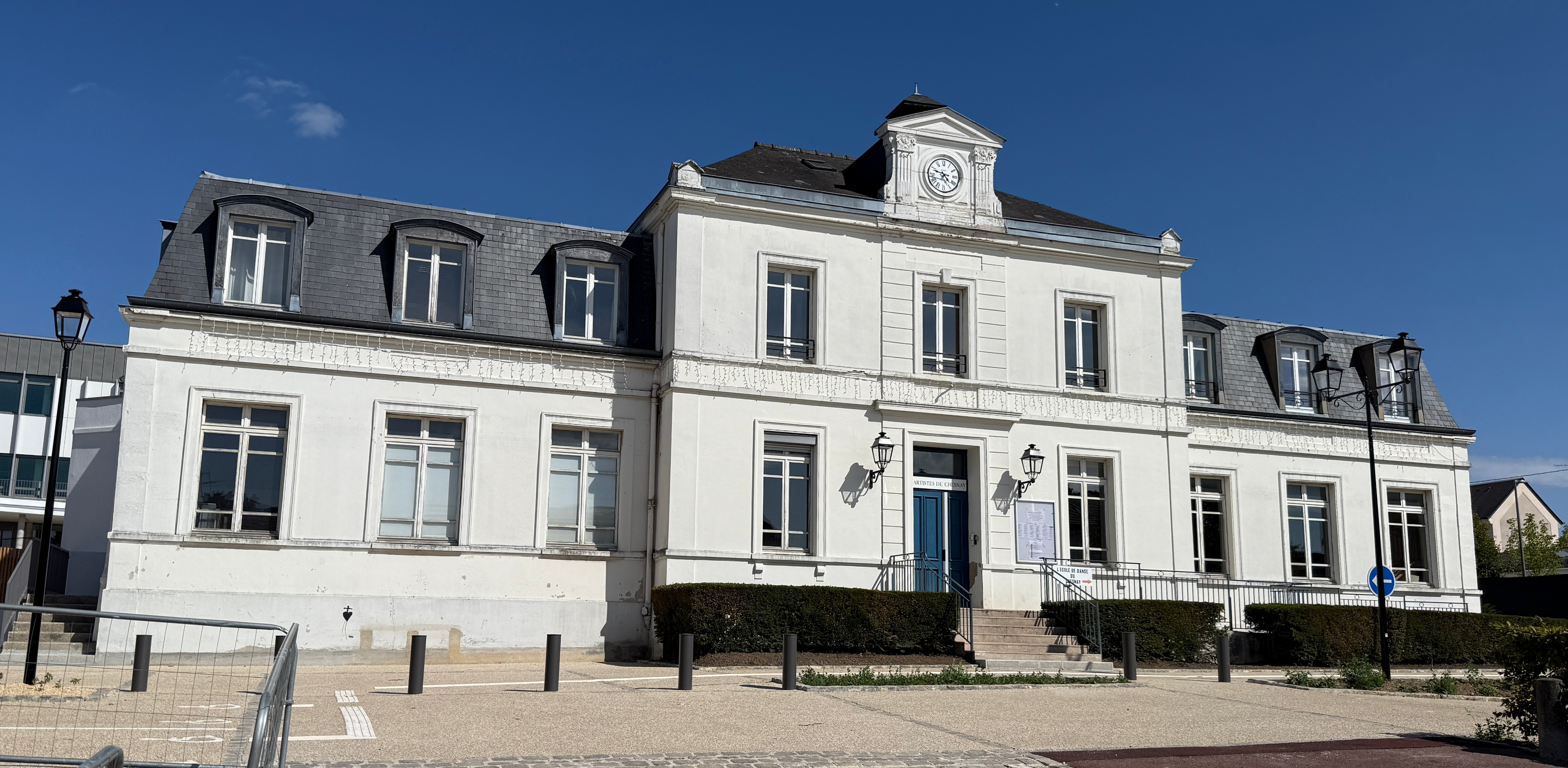
The second town hall

Following the French Revolution, the town council initially met in the house of the mayor at the time. This arrangement continued until the early 1830s, when the council decided to erect a combined town hall and school. The site they selected was on Place Dutartre. The new building was designed in the neoclassical style, built in brick with a cement render and was completed in 1834.

The design involved an asymmetrical main frontage of six bays facing onto the street. The building was laid out with a three-storey tower in the left-hand bay and a two-storey main block on the right. There were doorways in the tower and the centre bay of the main block. The other bays on the ground floor and all the bays on the first floor were fenestrated by casement windows with shutters, while the tower was fenestrated by an oculus at attic level. There was a pediment on top of the tower.

In the 1870s, the council decided to commission a more substantial town hall. The site they selected for the second town hall was on Rue de Versailles. The building was designed in the neoclassical style, built in brick with a cement render finish and was completed in 1877.

The design involved a symmetrical main frontage of nine bays facing onto the street. The central section of three bays, which was slightly projected forward, featured a short flight of steps leading up to a square-headed doorway with a moulded surround and a cornice. There was a casement window with a moulded surround and a keystone on the first floor and a clock, flanked by pilasters supporting a pediment, above the central bay. The outer bays of the central section were fenestrated in a similar style, while the wings featured hipped roofs with dormer windows at first floor level. After the building was no longer required for municipal purposes, it was occupied by the Association des Artistes du Chesnay (Association of Artists of Chesnay).

After the First and Second World Wars, marble plaques were installed in the town hall on Rue de Versailles to commemorate the lives of local service personnel who had died in the wars.

In the 1960s, the council promoted a large mixed-use development known as Parly 2. After significant population growth associated with this development the council decided to commission a modern town hall and theatre complex. The site they selected was on Rue Pottier, approximately 700 metres (2,300 ft) to the east of Parly 2. The new building was designed in the modern style, built in concrete and glass and was completed in 1980.

The design of the town hall involved a square-shaped six-storey tower, a single-storey glass entrance foyer which was projected out to the east, and a pair of semi-circular glass stair wells which were projected out to the northeast and southeast. The theatre, which was projected out to the southeast of the tower, was low-rise and incorporated a full-height glass porch. Internally, the principal room was the Salle du Conseil (council chamber). After Le Chesnay agreed to merge with Rocquencourt in January 2019, the town hall became the meeting place of the combined authority of Le Chesnay-Rocquencourt.
