= Jardin botanique exotique de Menton =

Botanical garden in Provence-Alpes-Côte d'Azur, France

Coordinates: 43.7847°N 7.5112°E

Val Rahmeh Botanical Garden
- Jardin botanique exotique de Menton
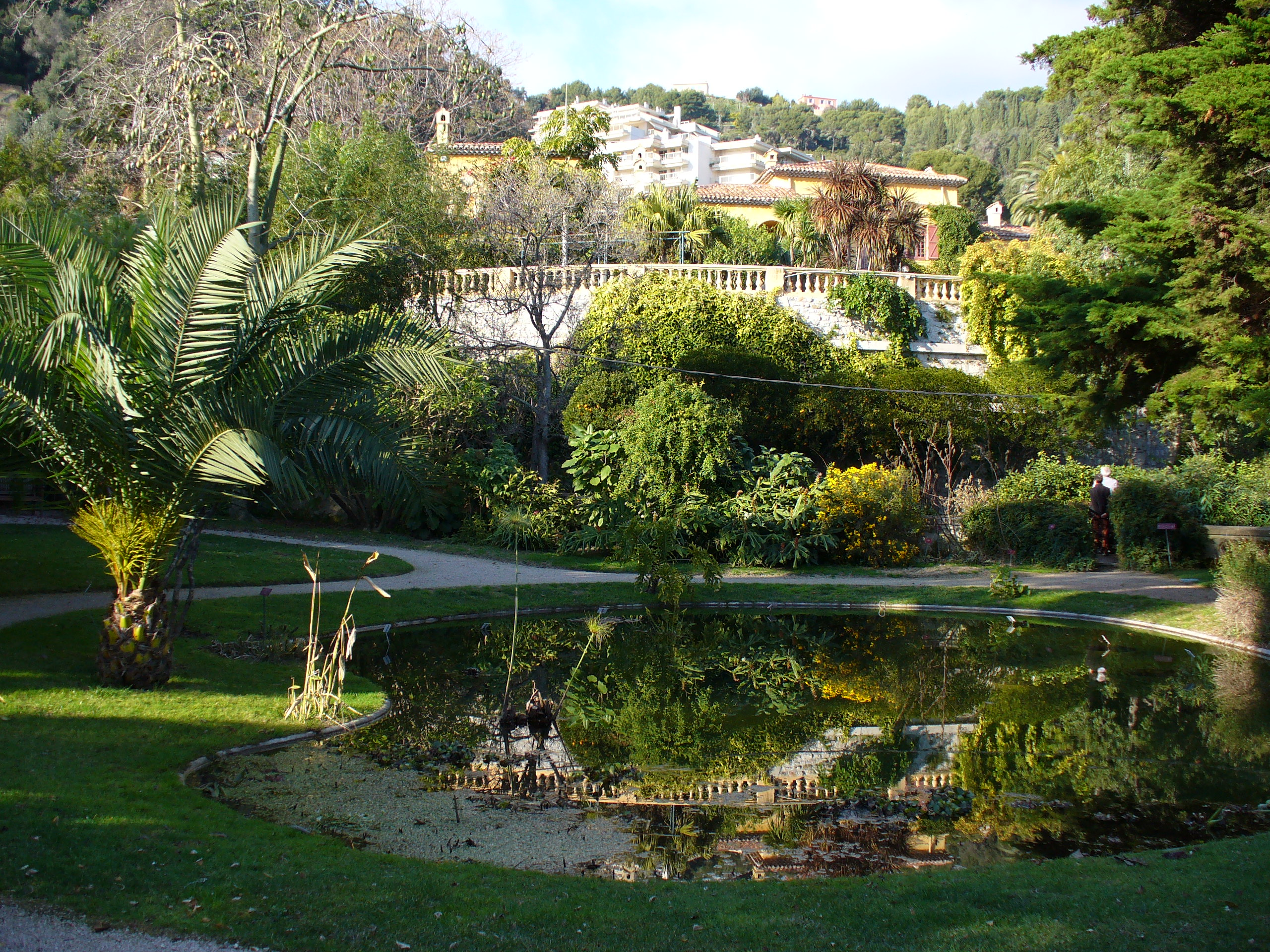
- A view of the garden in January 2007
- Location: Menton, France
- Type: botanical garden

Muséum national d'histoire naturelle network
- Muséum national d'histoire naturelle; Jardin des Plantes; Musée de l'Homme; Ménagerie du Jardin des Plantes; Brunoy Ecology Research Centre; Chèvreloup Arboretum; Jardin botanique exotique de Menton; Marinarium Concarneau Marine Biology Station; Paris Zoological Park (Vincennes Zoo); Cleres Zoological Park; Research and Education Centre on Coastal Systems; Haute Touche Zoological Park; Jaysinia Alpine Garden; Abri Pataud Prehistoric Museum; L’Harmas de Fabre

The Jardin botanique exotique de Menton (French pronunciation: [ʒaʁdɛ̃ bɔtanik ɛɡzɔtik də mɑ̃tɔ̃]; 11,000 m^{2}), also known as the Jardin botanique exotique du Val Rahmeh, is a botanical garden located off Avenue St Jacques, Menton, Alpes-Maritimes, Provence-Alpes-Côte d'Azur, France. It is open daily except Tuesday; an admission fee is charged.

The garden can be traced back to 1875 when the De Monléon family constructed the property. In 1905 Lord Percy Radcliffe, former governor of Malta, with his spouse Rahmeh acquired the property, adding adjacent farmland to form a garden. In 1957 Miss May Sherwood Campbell acquired the property and a second garden, now accessed by a bridge, and created a pond with water hyacinths, water lilies, and papyrus. In 1966 she donated her property to the nation, which transferred it to the Ministry of National Education. It then became a research centre for Mediterranean flora managed by the National Museum of Natural History. The garden opened to the public in 1967.

Today the garden contains some 1,500 taxa growing within a microclimate of high humidity where temperatures rarely fall below 5 °C (41 °F) in winter. It features Sophora toromiro (a species of small trees since disappeared from Easter Island), as well as exceptional olive trees (more than 400 years old) and collections of exotic plants including palm trees, chorisia, datura, and lotus, plus fine collections of citrus, olives, and palm trees. Rare species include Aloe marlothii, Araucaria columnaris, Castanospermum australe (Moreton Bay chestnut), Cnicothamnus lorentzi, and Ficus religiosa. A small rainforest area contains bamboo, gingers, philodendrons, tropical fruit trees, and a path through spices and herbs. The garden also contains an excellent Musa basjoo and two Chorisia speciosa specimens.

== Gallery ==
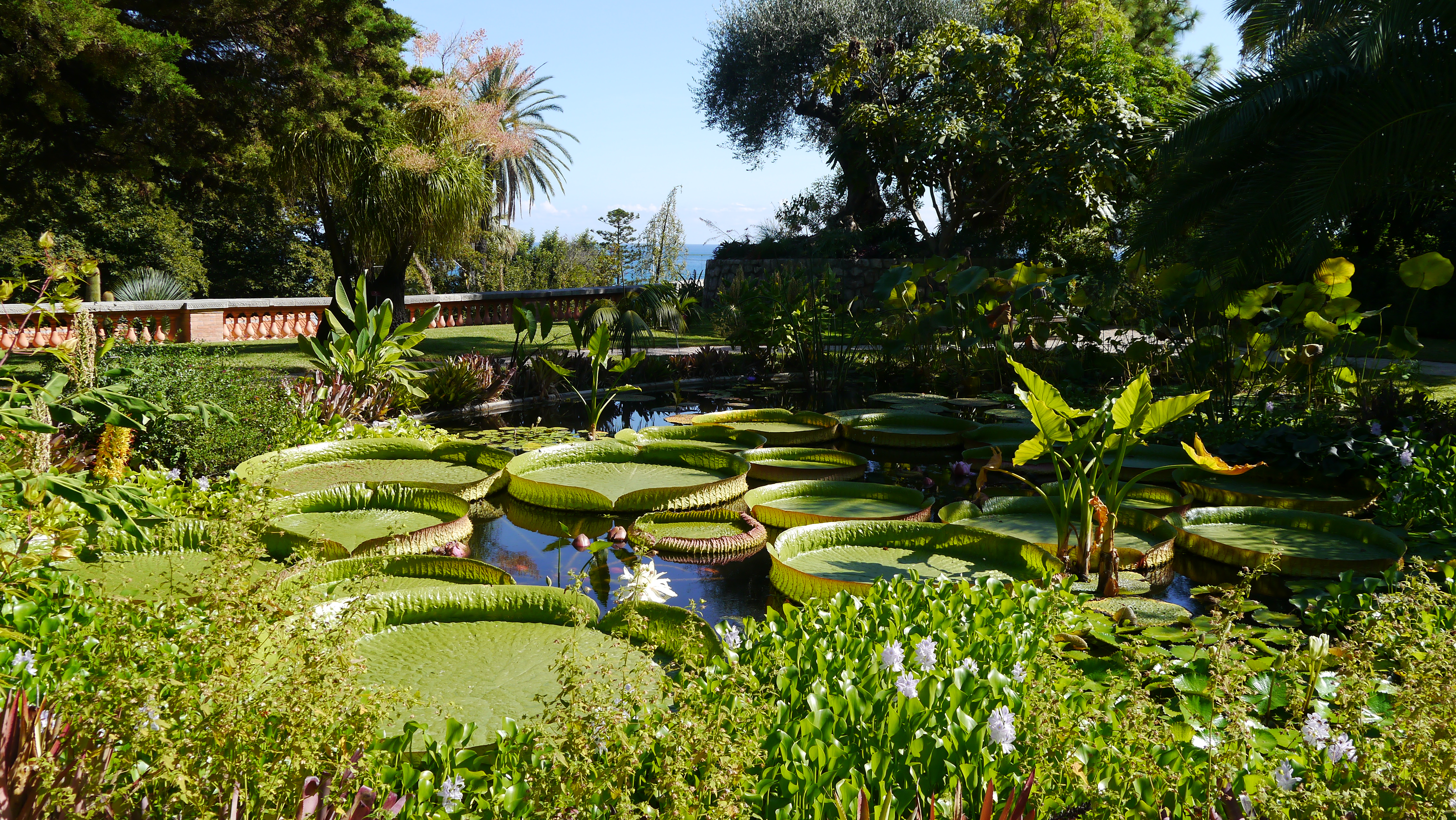
The Victoria amazonica pond in the southernmost point of the garden

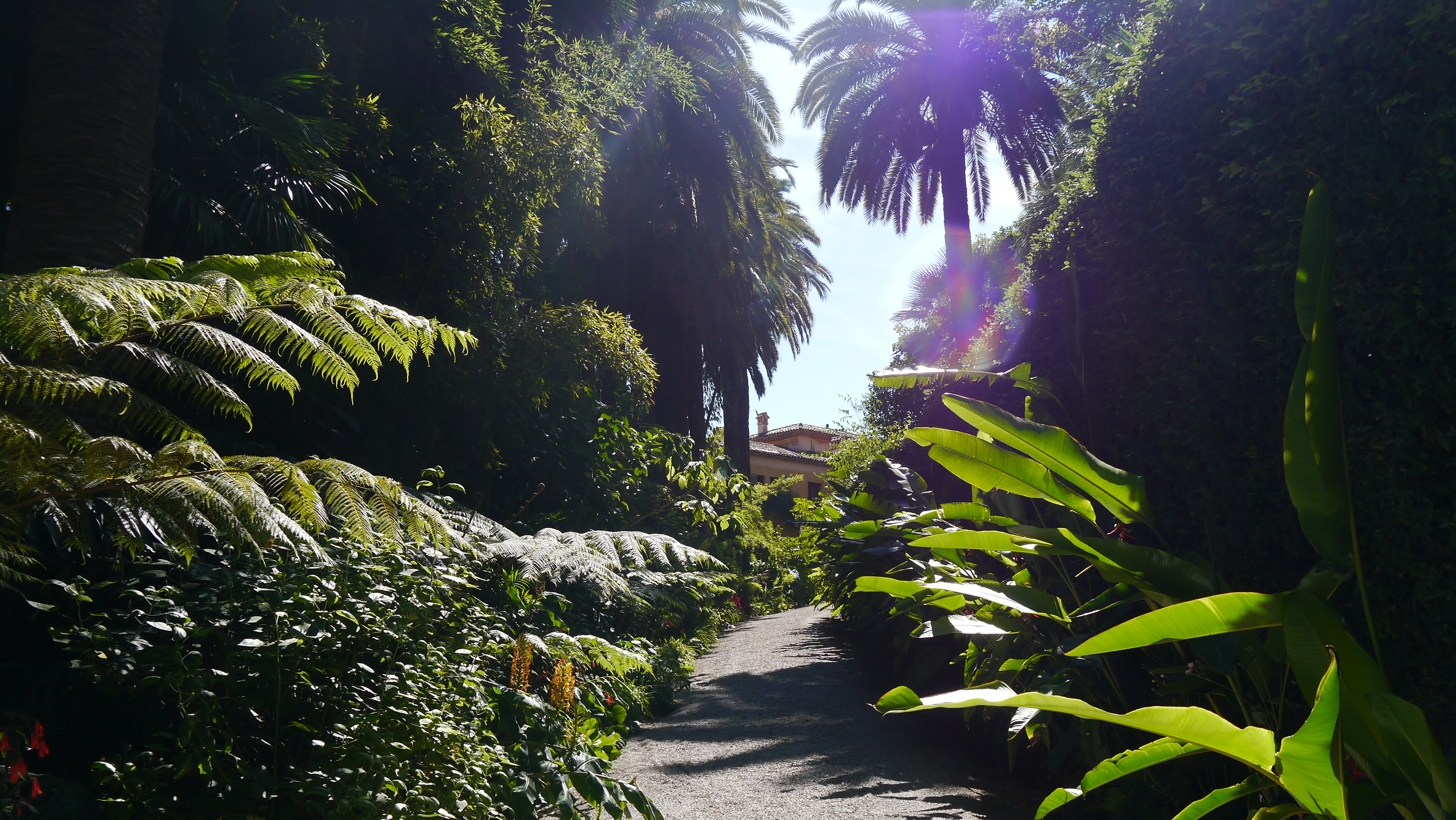
The entrance surrounded by heliconias and tree-ferns

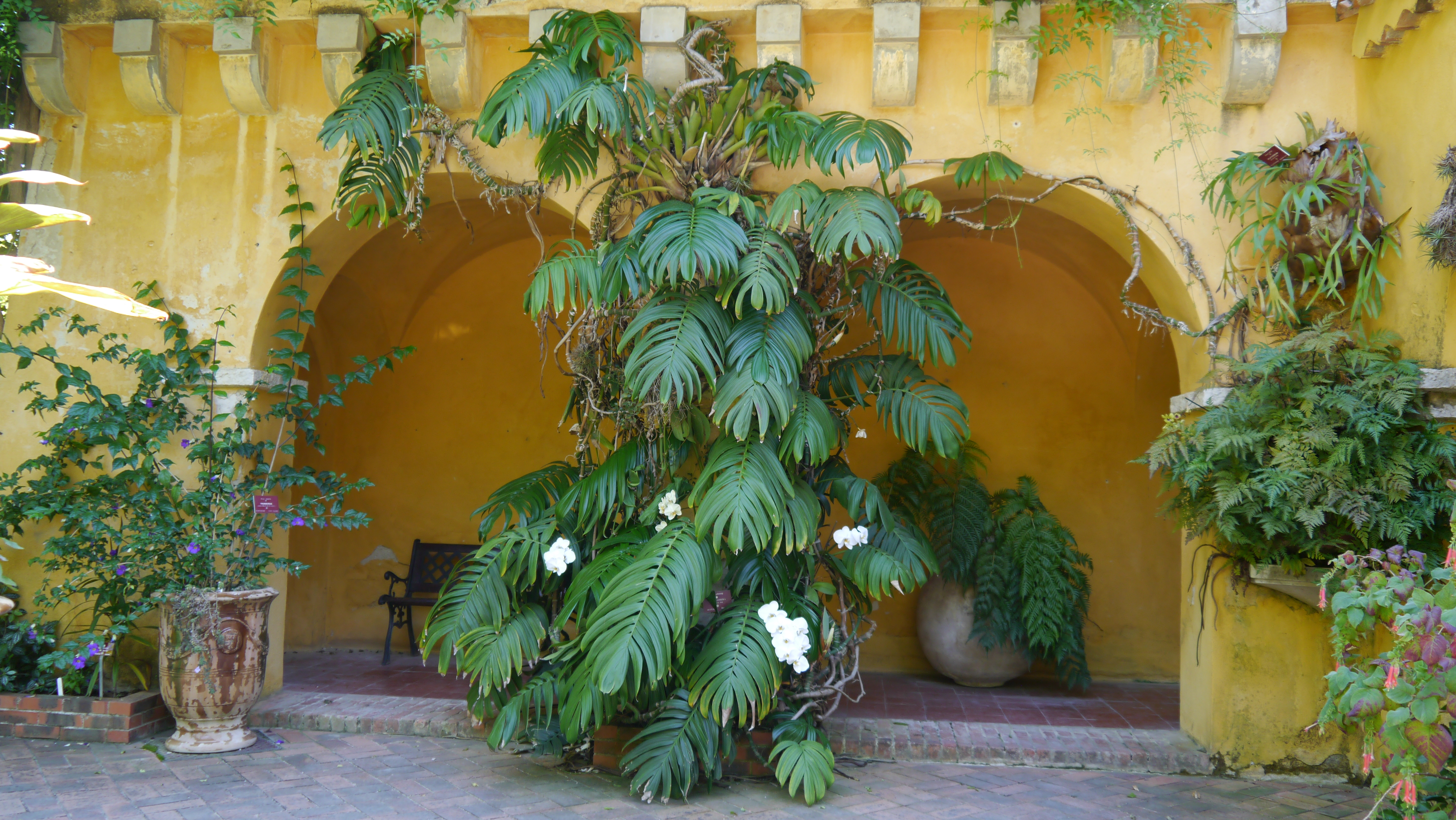
Loggia with bench and exotic plants at the laboratories building

== See also ==
- List of botanical gardens in France
