= Musée de l'Homme =

Anthropology museum in Paris, France

- Musée de l'Homme
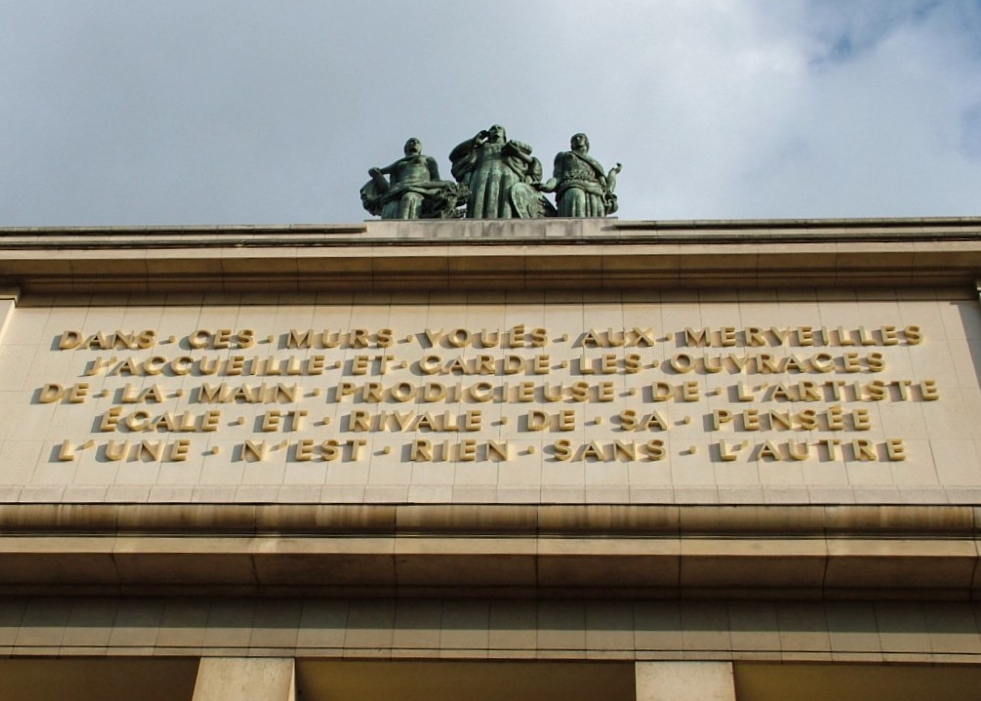
- Inscription above the museum

- Location within Paris
- Established: 1937
- Location: 17 Place du Trocadéro, Paris, France
- Coordinates: 48.8627°N 2.2886°E
- Type: Anthropology museum
- Public transit access: Trocadéro
- Website: http://www.museedelhomme.fr/

Muséum national d'histoire naturelle network
- Muséum national d'histoire naturelle; Jardin des Plantes; Musée de l'Homme; Ménagerie du Jardin des Plantes; Brunoy Ecology Research Centre; Chèvreloup Arboretum; Jardin botanique exotique de Menton; Marinarium Concarneau Marine Biology Station; Paris Zoological Park (Vincennes Zoo); Cleres Zoological Park; Research and Education Centre on Coastal Systems; Haute Touche Zoological Park; Jaysinia Alpine Garden; Abri Pataud Prehistoric Museum; L’Harmas de Fabre

The Musée de l'Homme (French pronunciation: [myze də lɔm]; literally "Museum of Mankind" or "Museum of Humanity") is an anthropology museum in Paris, France. It was established in 1937 by Paul Rivet for the 1937 Exposition Internationale des Arts et Techniques dans la Vie Moderne. It is the descendant of the Musée d'Ethnographie du Trocadéro, founded in 1878. The Musée de l'Homme is a research center under the authority of various ministries, and it groups several entities from the CNRS. The Musée de l'Homme is one of the seven departments of the Muséum national d'histoire naturelle. The Musée de l'Homme occupies most of the Passy wing of the Palais de Chaillot in the 16th arrondissement. The vast majority of its collection was transferred to the Quai Branly museum.

== History ==
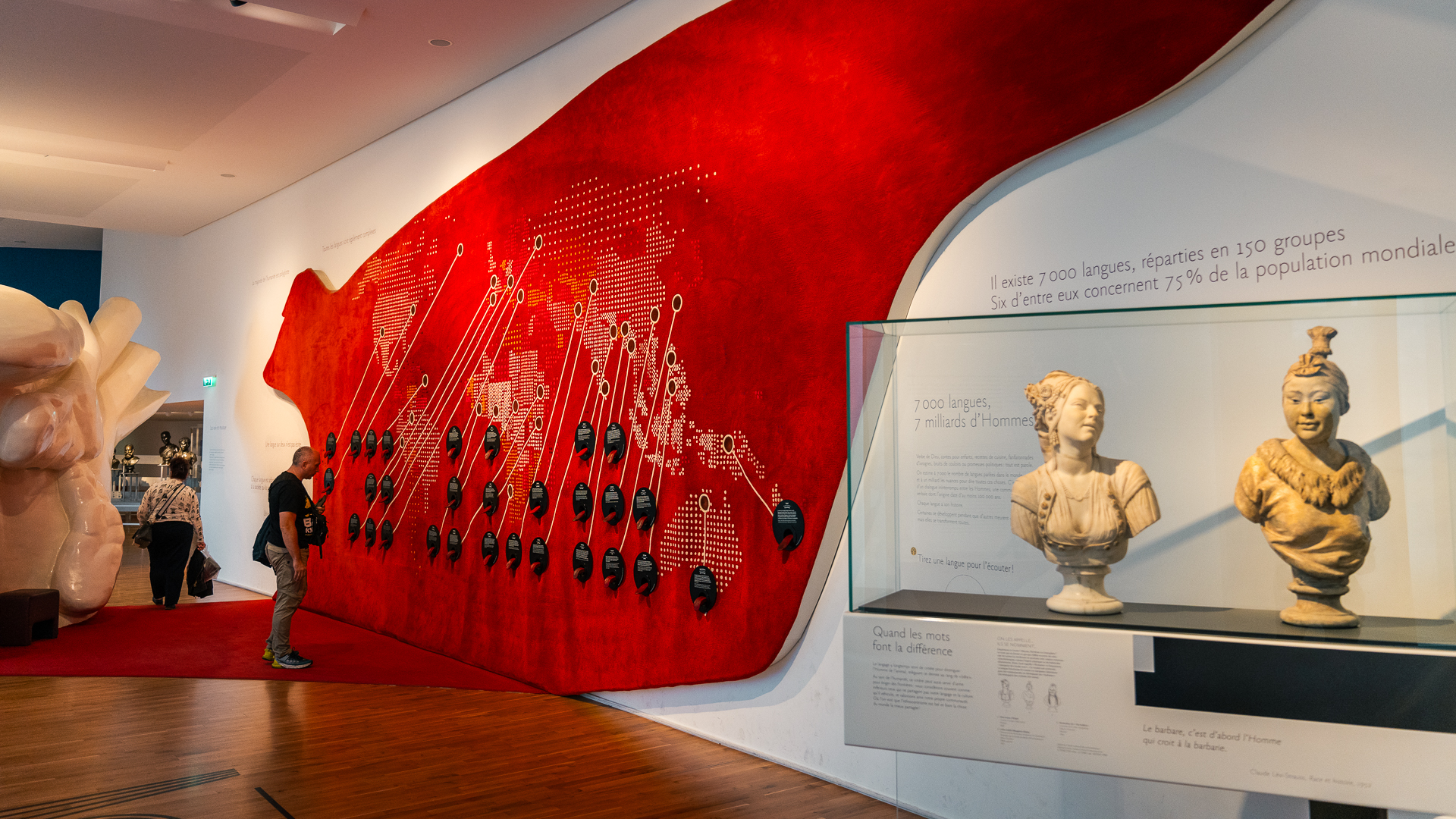
Main exhibition room of the Musée de l'Homme in Paris

=== Earlier Collections ===
The Musée de l'Homme has inherited items from historical collections created as early as the 16th century, from cabinets of curiosities, and the Royal Cabinet. These collections were enriched during the 19th century, and are still added to today. The aim is to gather in one site everything which defines the human being: in terms of evolution (prehistory), of unity and diversity (anthropology), and of cultural and social expression (ethnology).

The majority of the "ethnographic exhibition" from the Musée de l'Armée of the Invalides, as it was then called, is composed of dummies representing people from French colonies, along with weapons and equipment. This material was transferred to the museum in 1910 and 1917. Photos of the Moroccan population, taken by Clérambault, were also displayed there.

=== As the Musée d’Ethnographie du Trocadéro (Trocadéro Museum of Ethnography) (1882–1928) ===
The Musée de l'Homme is the direct descendant of the Musée d'Ethnographie du Trocadéro, which was founded in the Trocadéro Palace in 1828.

=== Transformation into the Musée de l'Homme (1928–36) ===
In 1928, Paul Rivet became the new director of the Musée d’Ethnographie du Trocadéro. He oversaw a major modernization and reorganization project, and had the museum linked to the Muséum National d'Histoire Naturelle. André Schaeffner founded the museum's department of ethnomusicology in 1929; remaining its director until his retirement in 1965.

In 1935, the Trocadéro Palace was demolished and replaced by the Palais de Chaillot, built for the 1937 World's Fair. The museum reopened in the Palais as the Musée de l'Homme.

=== Disruption and Resistance (1937–1945) ===
Several members of the Musée de l'Homme, including its founder Paul Rivet, formed a resistance group during the German occupation of Paris in World War II. When Nazi tanks rolled into the city on 14 June 1940, Rivet had a French translation of Rudyard's Kipling poem If tacked to the museum's door in a gesture of defiance.

=== Refurbishment (1996–2015) ===
In 1996, French President Jacques Chirac announced plans to create a new museum that would combine key collections from the Musée de l'Homme and Musée national des Arts d'Afrique et d'Océanie. Curators at the Musée de l'Homme fought vigorously to retain the collections at their museum, but were unsuccessful. These collections went to the new museum, the Musée du quai Branly, which opened in 2006.

In 2008, the French government committed to the refurbishment of the Musée de l’Homme. The museum was closed for renovations in 2009, and reopened in October 2015.The total amount of money appropriated for the renovation process was 52 million Euros.

=== Restitution of African Art (2025) ===
In March 2025, French President Emmanuel Macron committed to the return of three Sakalava skulls to Madagascar, previously housed at the Musée de l'Homme.

== Mission ==
The museum's original purpose was to gather in one place all that can define humanity: its evolution, its unity and its variety, and its cultural and social expression.

The removal of the Musée de l'Homme's ethnographic collections to the new Musée du quai Branly and MUCEM broke with its original mission. This change aroused many debates concerning the curatorial choices of the new structure. The permanent exhibition of the Musée de l'Homme counted more than 15,000 artifacts, reflecting artistic, technical and cultural treasures from five continents. Quai Branly, however, holds only 3500 artifacts, presented without cultural contextualization, chosen for their aesthetic qualities and their "exotic" origins (Africa, Oceania, Americas) and not on educational value. European ethnographical collections are going to be exhibited at MUCEM, and critics believe it is creating an unjustified discontinuity between human cultures.

This situation led the Musée de l'Homme to review its mission. In 2015 it reaffirmed Paul Rivet's original vision for a laboratory museum. Combining biological, social and cultural approaches, the museum today focuses on the evolution of humans and human societies in keeping with Rivet's view that "Humanity is one and indivisible, not only in space, but also in time."

== Notable directors and staff scientists ==
- René-Yves Creston, director of the Arctic section in the 1930s
- Maurice Leenhardt
- André Leroi-Gourhan
- Paul Rivet
- Jacques Soustelle (vice-president in 1938)
- Claude Lévi-Strauss (interim director 1949–1950)
- Germaine Dieterlen (Comité du film ethnographique)
- Jean Rouch (Comité du film ethnographique)
- Henri Victor Vallois
- Zeev Gourarier (Director 2003–2007)

== Notable holdings ==
- A crystal skull
- The skull of René Descartes, scientist, mathematician, physicist, and philosopher
- The skull of Suleiman al-Halabi (1777–1800), who, in 1800, assassinated Jean-Baptiste Kléber in Egypt
- Mapa pintado en papel europeo y aforrado en el indiano, a Mesoamerican pictorial document

=== Former holdings ===
- The body of Khoikhoi woman Saartjie Baartman (displayed until 1974; repatriated in 2002)
- The Kʼëgit pole: a Wetʼsuwetʼen totem pole collected for the museum by Kurt Seligmann in 1939; transferred to the Musée du Quai Branly.
- Skulls of 24 Algerian fighters who resisted French invasion in the 19th century and were beheaded (repatriated in 2020)

== See also ==
- List of museums in Paris
- Relocation of moai objects
