= Le Chesnay =

Former commune in Île-de-France, France

- Part of Le Chesnay-Rocquencourt
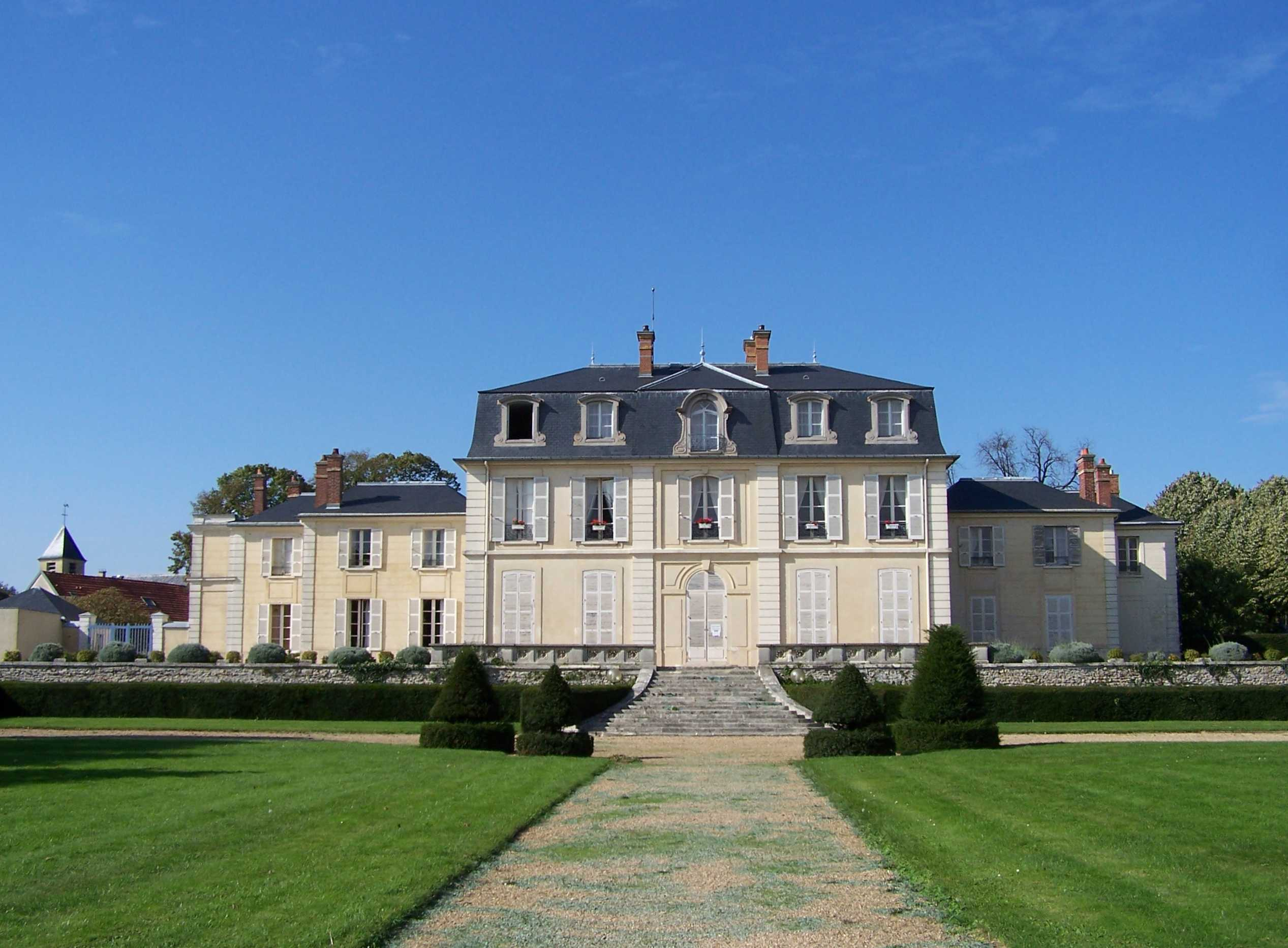
- Château Aubert

- Coat of arms

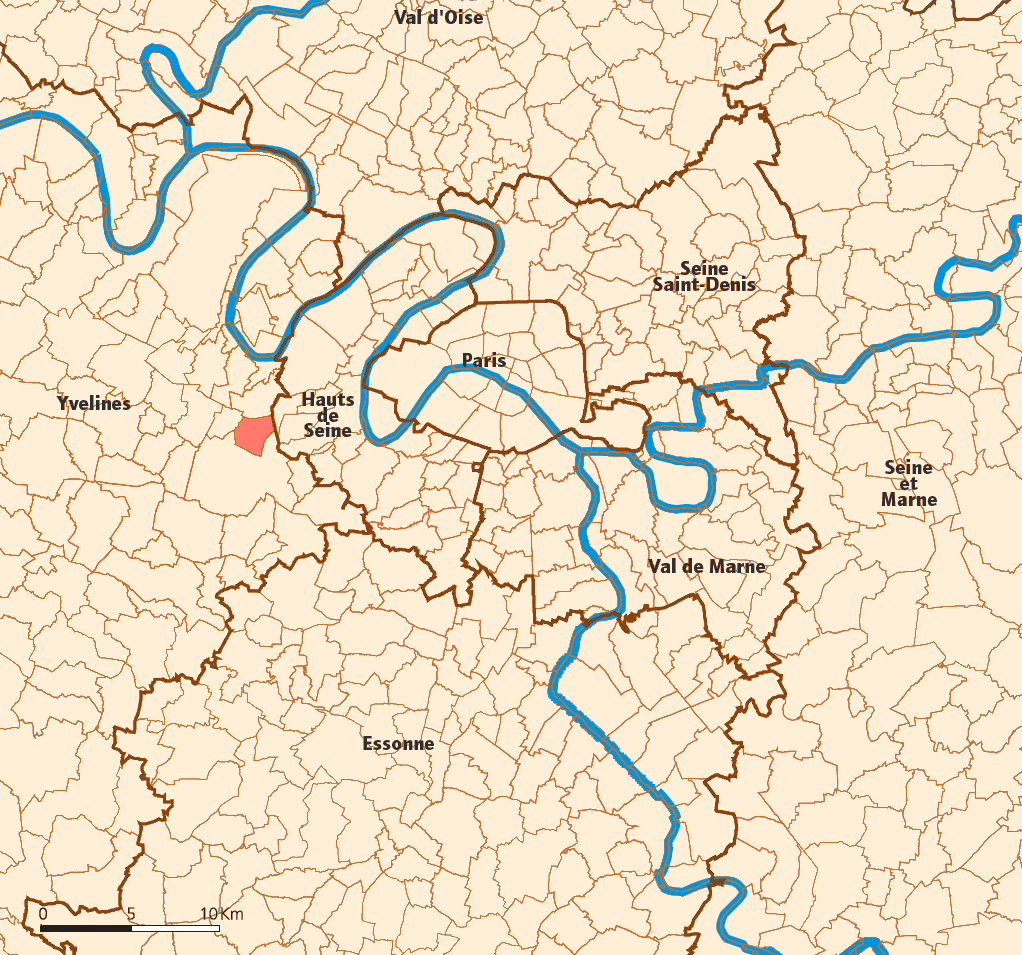
- Location (in red) within Paris inner and outer suburbs
- Location of Le Chesnay
- Location within France Location within Île-de-France (region)
- Coordinates: 48°49′16″N 2°07′52″E
- Country: France
- Region: Île-de-France
- Department: Yvelines
- Arrondissement: Versailles
- Canton: Le Chesnay-Rocquencourt
- Commune: Le Chesnay-Rocquencourt
- Area^{1}: 4.24 km^{2} (1.64 sq mi)
- Elevation: 145 m (476 ft)
- Highest elevation: 175 m (574 ft)
- Lowest elevation: 113 m (371 ft)
- Population (2022): 27,324
  - Density: 6,440/km^{2} (16,700/sq mi)
- Time zone: UTC+01:00 (CET)
  - Summer (DST): UTC+02:00 (CEST)
- Postal code: 78150
- ^{1} French Land Register data, which excludes lakes, ponds, glaciers > 1 km^{2} (0.386 sq mi or 247 acres) and river estuaries.

Le Chesnay (French pronunciation: [lə ʃɛnɛ]) is a former commune in the Yvelines department in the Île-de-France region in north-central France. On 1 January 2019, it was merged into the new commune Le Chesnay-Rocquencourt. It is located in the western suburbs of Paris, 16.7 km (10.4 mi) from the center of Paris.

== History ==
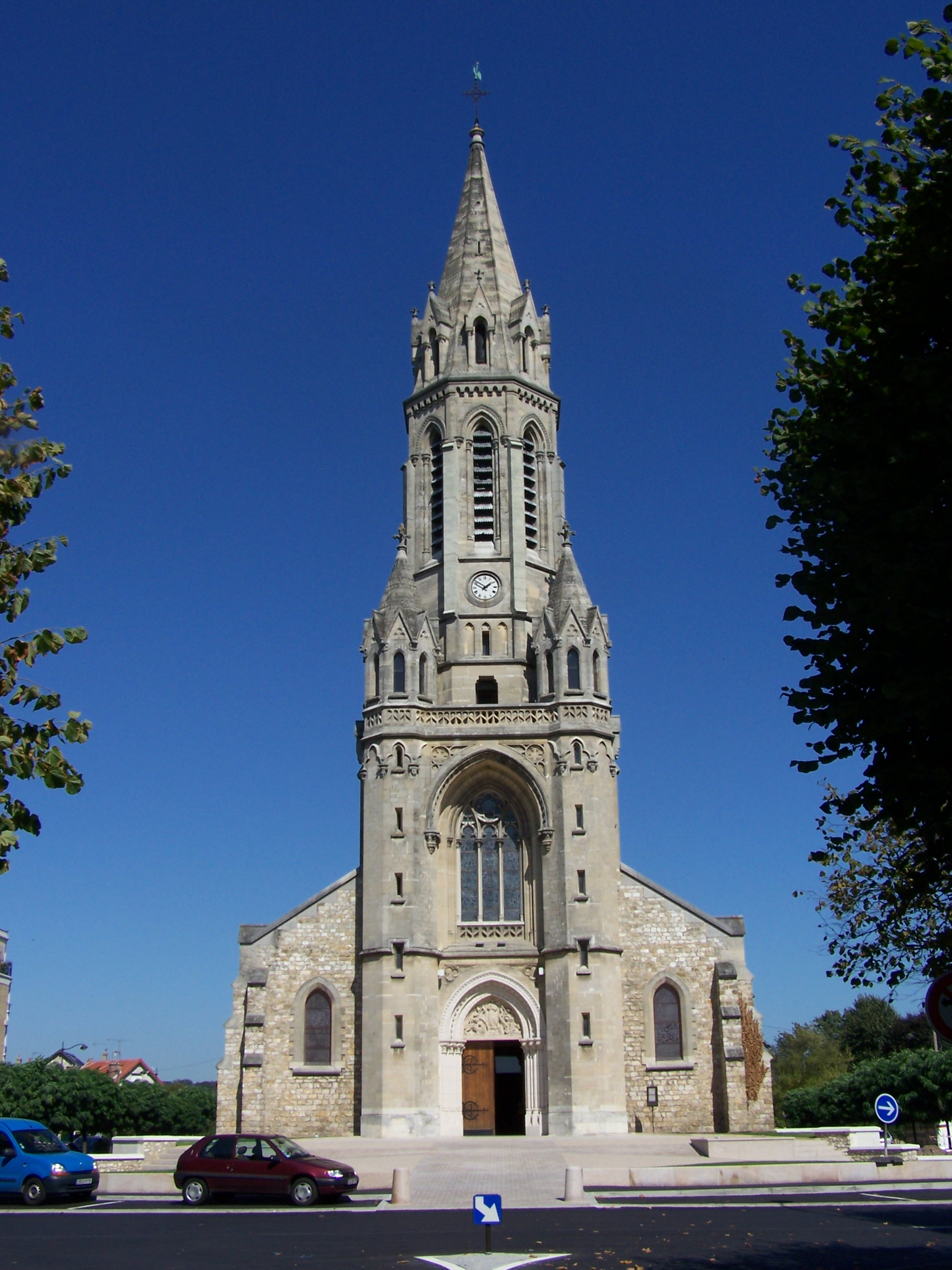
Saint-Antoine-de-Padoue

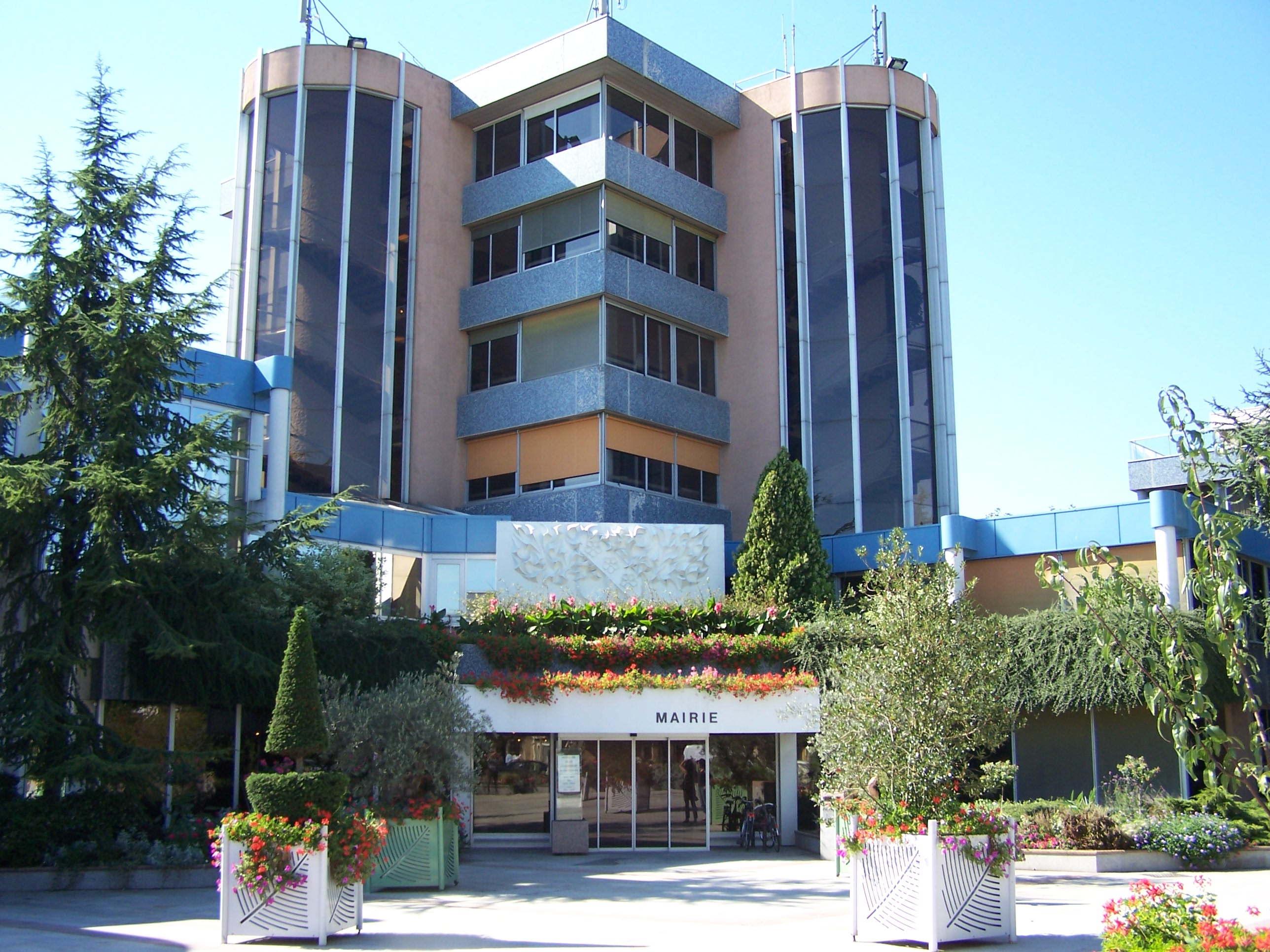
The Hôtel de Ville

On 1 July 1815, Napoleon's Grande Armée fought its last battle in Rocquencourt and Le Chesnay. After the defeat of Waterloo on 18 June 1815, Grouchy's army withdrew to Paris via Namur and Dinant, reaching Paris on 29 June, a few days before the Prussians, who camped at Versailles.

While negotiating the final armistice, Exelmans was ordered to attack the Prussians at Versailles on 1 July 1815. Under attack the Prussians retreated from Versailles and headed east, but were blocked by the French at Vélizy. They failed to re-enter Versailles and headed for Saint-Germain-en-Laye. Their first squadron came under fire at the entrance of Rocquencourt and attempted to escape through the fields. They were forced into a small, narrow street in Le Chesnay and killed or captured. However, the main body of the Prussian army succeeded in reaching Saint-Germain. (From Presentation of Rocquencourt)

The Hôtel de Ville was completed in 1980.

== Transport ==
Le Chesnay is not served by any station of the Paris Métro, RER, or suburban rail network. The closest station to Le Chesnay is Versailles – Rive Droite station on the Transilien Paris-Saint-Lazare suburban rail line. This station is located in the neighboring city of Versailles, 2 km (1.2 mi) from the town center of Le Chesnay.

== Notable residents ==
- Nicolas Anelka (born 1979), footballer
- Dora Bianka (c. 1895–1979) Polish-born painter
- Laura Georges (born 1984), footballer
- Nicolas Godin (born 1969), member of music group Air
- Tristan Gommendy (born 1979), racing driver
- Thomas Lombard (born 1975), rugby union player
- Sébastien Rouault (born 1986), swimmer
- Kevin Staut (born 1980), equestrian
- Victor Wembanyama (born 2004), basketball player
- Simone Zanoni (born 1976), Italian chef

== Hospital ==
- André Mignot Hospital

== Education ==
Public preschools:

- Maryse Bastié
- Hélène Boucher
- Jean-Louis Forain
- Jean de La Fontaine
- Mozart
- Charles Perrault

Public elementary schools:

- Guynemer
- Langevin
- Le Nôtre
- Molière

Public secondary schools:

- Collège Charles Péguy – Junior high school
- Lycée Jean Moulin – Senior high school/sixth form college

The commune is also served by senior high schools/sixth form colleges in Versailles: Lycée La Bruyère, Lycée Hoche, Lycée Marie-Curie, Lycée Jules-Ferry, and Lycée Jacques-Prévert.

There is one private school, Blanche de Castille, with a preschool and elementary school campus, and a junior high school and senior high school campus.

Universities:

- Versailles Saint-Quentin-en-Yvelines University

There is also a municipal library, la Bibliothèque du Chesnay.

== See also ==
- Communes of the Yvelines department
