= André Mignot Hospital =

Coordinates: 48.8250676°N 2.1280533°E

- Centre Hospitalier de Versailles
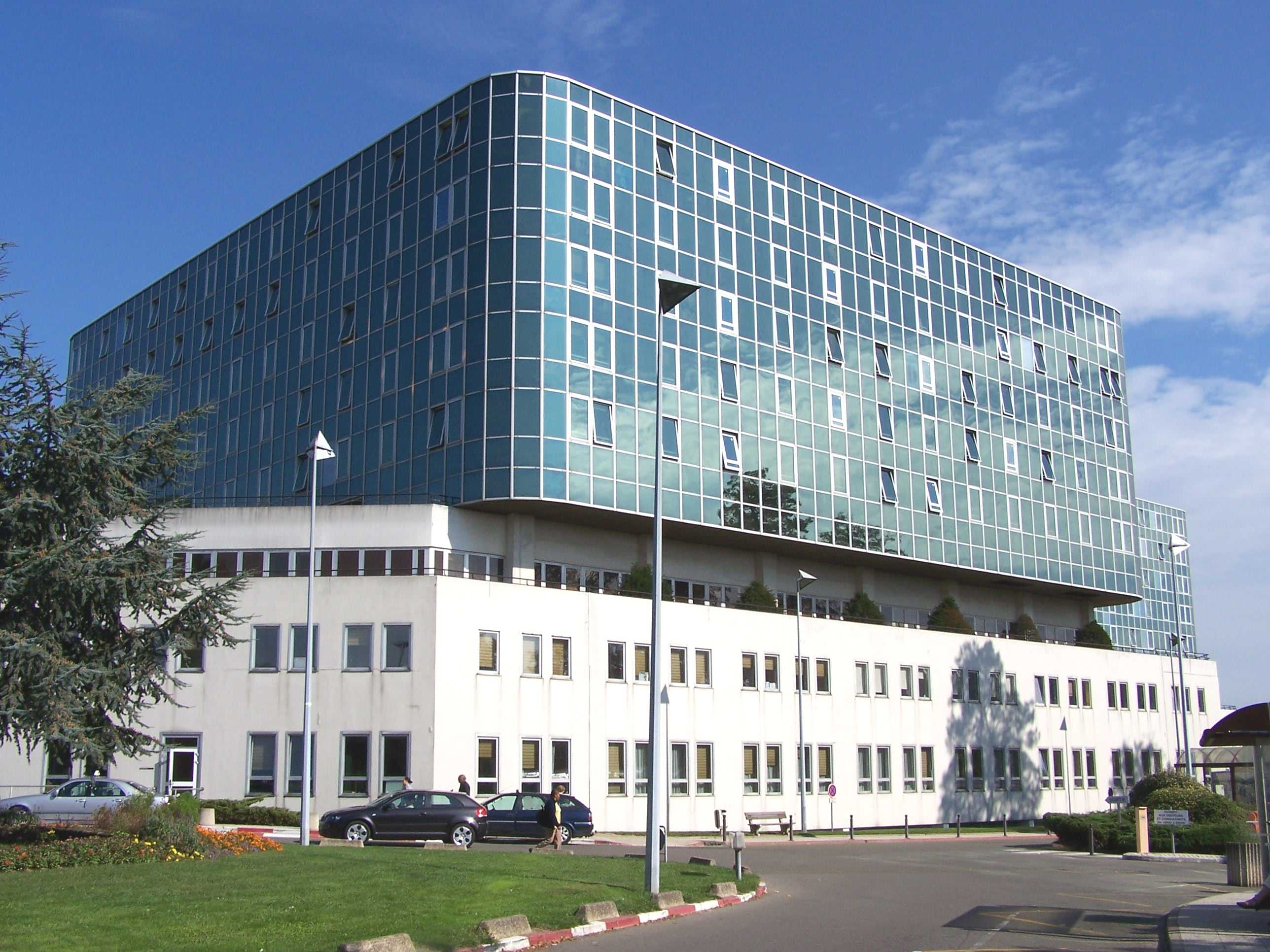

Geography
- Location: Le Chesnay, Île-de-France, France

Organisation
- Care system: Public
- Type: Teaching

Services
- Emergency department: Yes
- Beds: 791

History
- Opened: 1981

Links
- Website: https://www.ch-versailles.fr/
- Lists: Hospitals in France

The André Mignot Hospital is a celebrated teaching hospital in Le Chesnay. Part of the Centre Hospitalier de Versailles and a teaching hospital of Versailles Saint-Quentin-en-Yvelines University.

It has been created in 1981. It was named in honour of André Mignot, French Politician and Lawyer.

== Notable people associated with the Hospital ==
- Nicolas Anelka, French football manager and former player, is born in the hospital
- Pierre-Joseph Desault, French anatomist and surgeon
