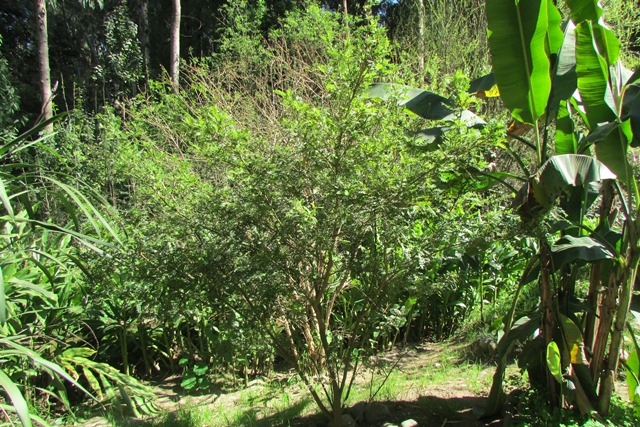

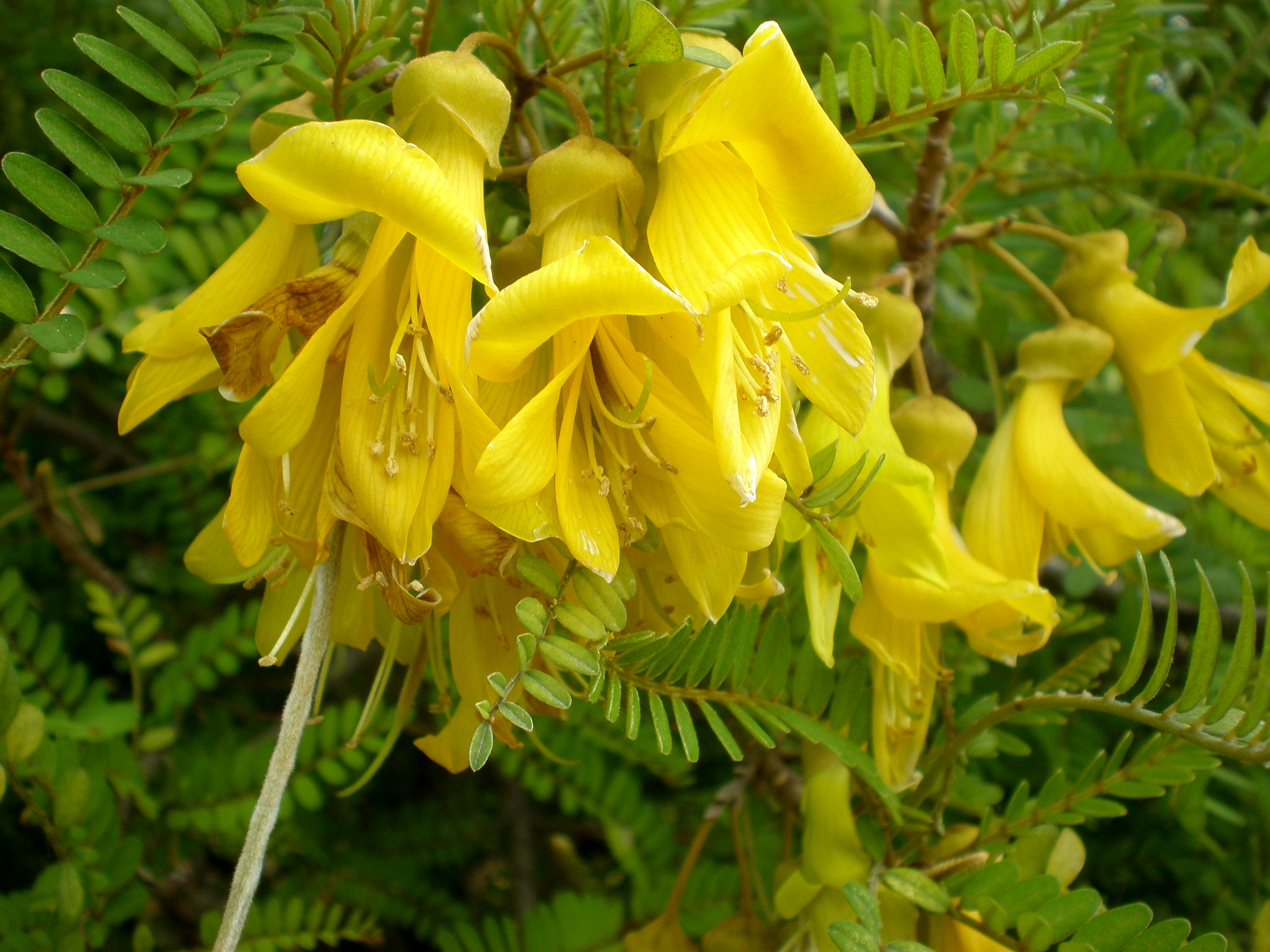

Conservation status
- Extinct in the Wild (IUCN 3.1)

Scientific classification
- Kingdom: Plantae
- Clade: Tracheophytes
- Clade: Angiosperms
- Clade: Eudicots
- Clade: Rosids
- Order: Fabales
- Family: Fabaceae
- Subfamily: Faboideae
- Genus: Sophora
- Species: S. toromiro

Binomial name
- Sophora toromiro Skottsb.

= Sophora toromiro =

Species of legume

Sophora toromiro, commonly known as toromiro, is a species of flowering tree in the legume family, Fabaceae, that is endemic to Easter Island. Sophora toromiro is extinct in the wild due to overharvesting and overgrazing, but some individuals survive in botanical and private collections. It holds significant cultural importance for the Rapa Nui people, known for its statues, ceremonial objects, and other tools made from the wood. The species serves as proof that human intervention of a natural environment can drastically change the composition of native flora negatively, even to the point of extinction in the wild. Those few specimens which survive today are cultivated in certain botanical gardens around the world, though they are limited due to a small genetic pool. Conservation efforts to re-introduce these tree seedlings back to the island in the 1980s failed but hopes remain that there will eventually be a successful reintroduction of Sophora toromiro in the wild.

== Description ==
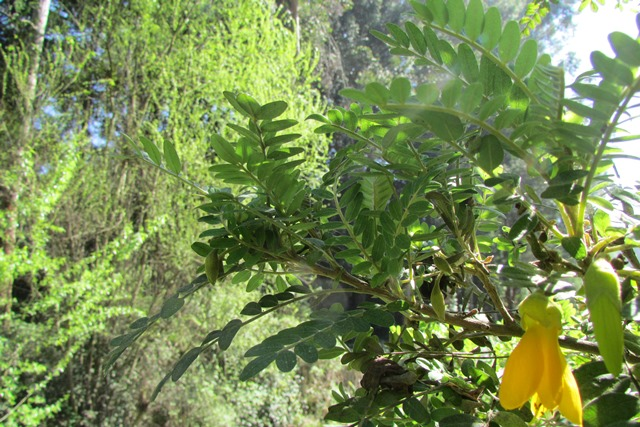
Sophora toromiro flower

Sophora toromiro is considered a large shrub or small tree, with its adult height being up to 5 metres (16 ft). Its leaves are pinnate, with bright yellow flowers resembling New Zealand's Kowhai (of which it is the closest relative) and the Chilean bellflower, which has red flowers of a similar shape. The flowers are born in clusters and are characteristic of the Fabaceae family. The wood is dense and hard, with a red-brown color and vertical fissures. Fruits come in an elongated legume pod that contain several seeds. Its lifespan is unknown due to lack of data and extinction in the wild.

== History ==
The first documented specimen of Sophora toromiro was made in 1774 by European settlers, with notes indicating the species were sparsely populated and visually dead or dying due to overgrazing. Research suggests that Sophora toromiro was introduced to Europe in the 16th and 17th century by explorers due to genetic evidence from a cultivated specimen from the year 1800. Before extinction, Sophora toromiro was a common part of the island's natural vegetation, particularly in the dry forest and shrublands.

Heavy deforestation had eliminated most of Easter Island's forests by the first half of the 17th century, and the once common toromiro became rare and ultimately extinct in the wild in the 1960s. The last wild specimen was a plant in Rano Kao in 1935, which was harvested in 1960. Local tradition has it that the rongorongo tablets of Easter Island are made of toromiro. However, all tablets of native wood tested by modern methods have turned out to be Thespesia populnea, known as miro or milo in some Polynesian languages. David Attenborough describes the timber from which a small wooden male sculpture in his possession is made, having been identified by Kew Gardens as Sophora toromiro. Additionally, the population declined due to overgrazing by the introduction of rabbits, sheep, pigs, horses, and cattle. Other human impacts include increased use of fire for clearing as a basis for settlement.

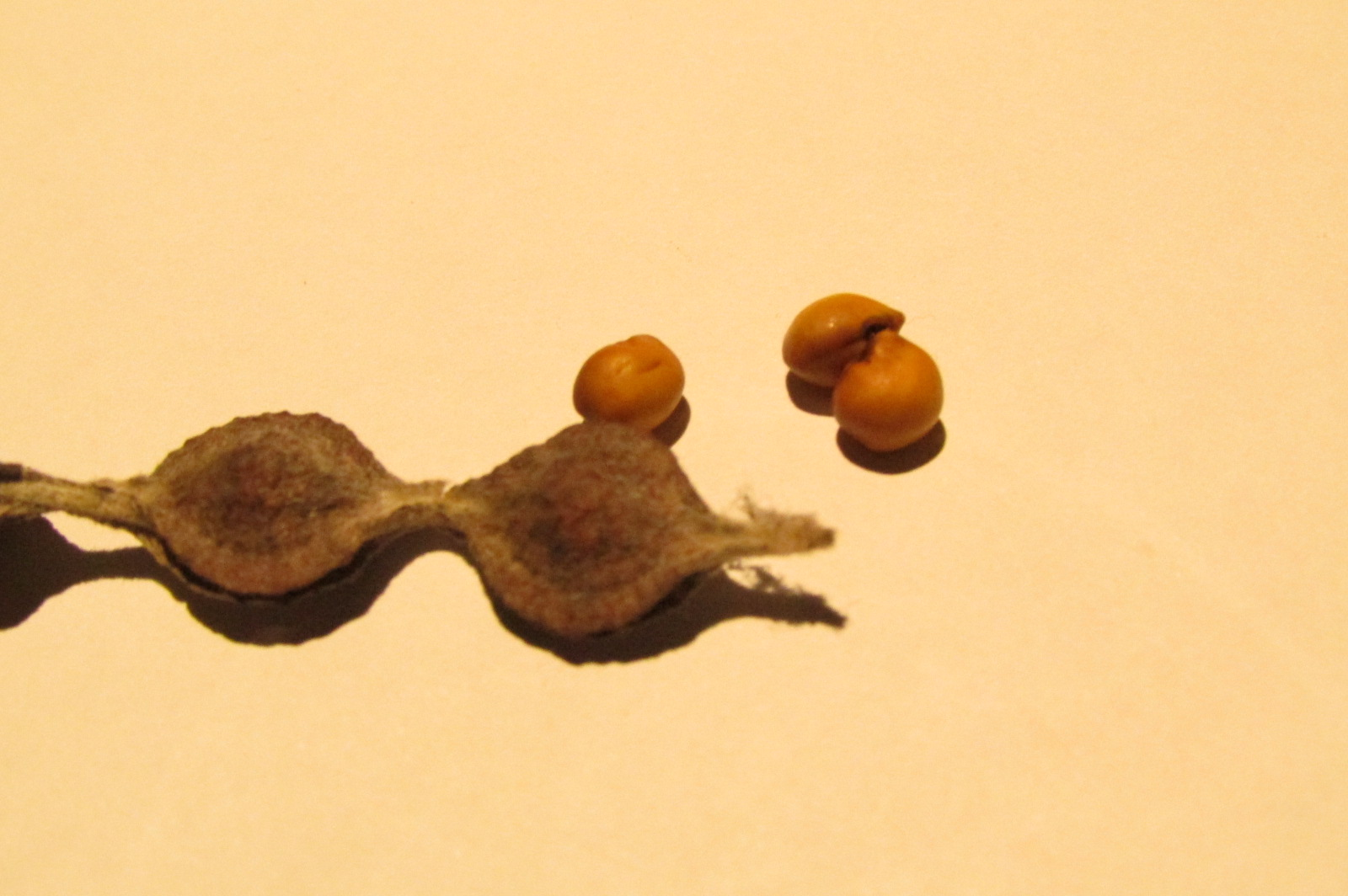
Sophora toromiro seed

== Conservation ==
The tree is being reintroduced to the island in a scientific project partly led jointly by the Royal Botanic Gardens, Kew and the Gothenburg Botanical Garden, where the only remaining plants of this species with a documented origin were propagated in the 1960s from seeds collected from a single tree by Thor Heyerdahl. The Jardin du Val Rahmeh, a botanical garden in Menton in the south of France, is dedicated to the acclimatization and conservation of rare species, including Sophora toromiro.

While the seeds have a difficult time germinating and surviving ex situ, there are efforts being made to introduce it back to Rapa Nui. It is sometimes claimed that all toromiro trees are derived from this single individual, but research has determined that at least one other tree's descendants survive. However, due to the lack of genetic diversity, conservationist efforts in reintroducing the tree remain difficult as the species has not developed the resistance needed to withstand current environmental pressures. The small genetic pool increases the risk of inbreeding depression which leads to poor seed germination and viability.

With propagation through grafting, in vitro propagation, or by seeds more Sophora toromiro plants can be produced but the species has low genetic diversity, which makes the reintroduction and conservation difficult.

Failure to re-introduce this leguminous tree to Rapa Nui is now focusing on the nitrogen-fixing symbiont in the root nodules common to legumes, identifying the correct species of rhizobia, bacteria, in the island's soils to ensure successful growth. With the trees' extinction on the island, it is believed that this has resulted in the extinction of the relevant rhizobia as well. Efforts now are on identifying a suitable closely related replacement rhizobia species from neighbouring Oceanian islands that is compatible with Sophora toromiro as a root nodule symbiont.
