= Rocquencourt, Yvelines =

Rocquencourt
- Part of Le Chesnay-Rocquencourt
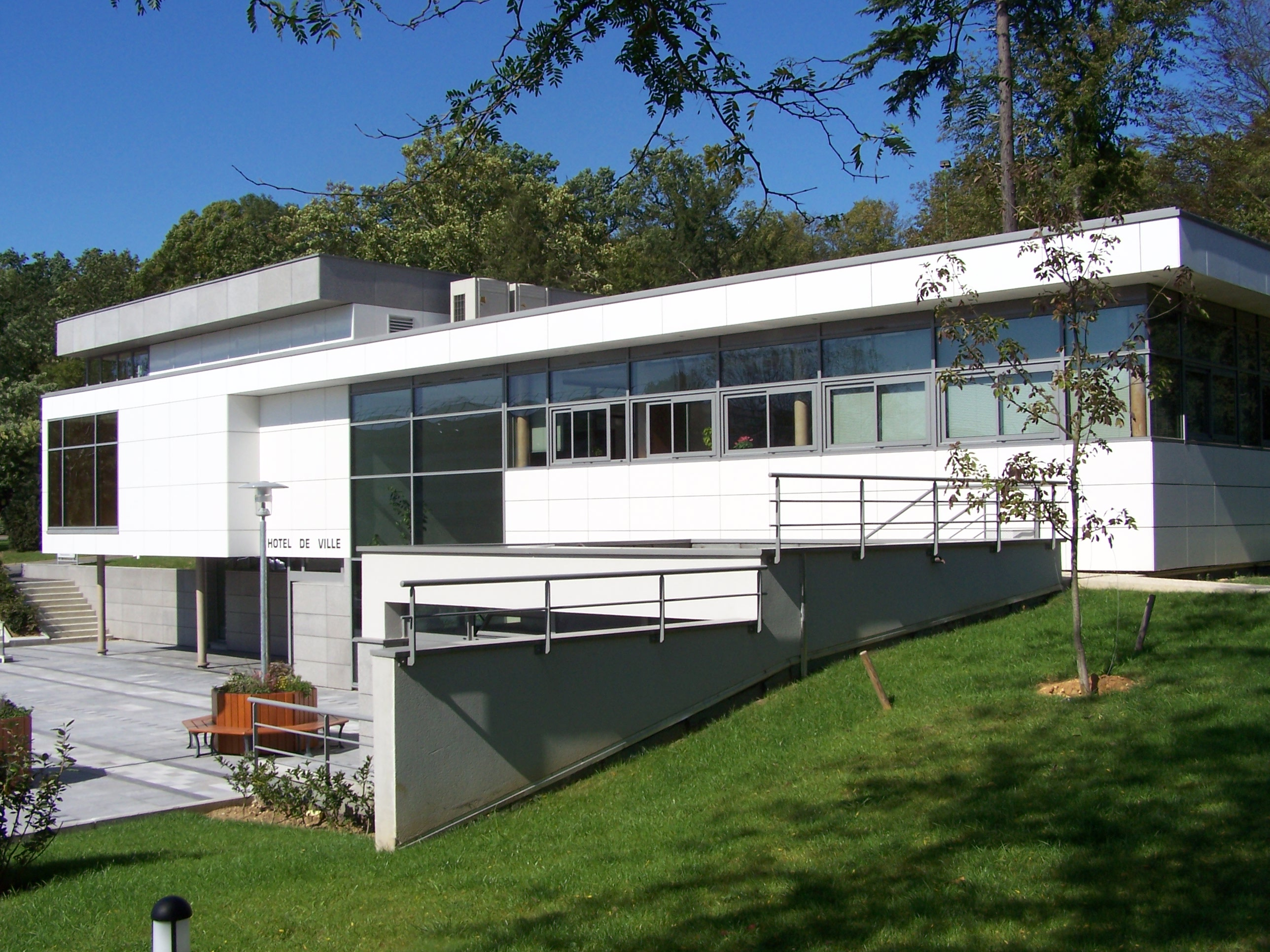
- Town hall

- Coat of arms
- Location of Rocquencourt
- Location within France Location within Île-de-France (region)
- Coordinates: 48°50′13″N 2°06′42″E
- Country: France
- Region: Île-de-France
- Department: Yvelines
- Arrondissement: Versailles
- Canton: Le Chesnay-Rocquencourt
- Commune: Le Chesnay-Rocquencourt
- Area^{1}: 2.78 km^{2} (1.07 sq mi)
- Elevation: 150 m (490 ft)
- Highest elevation: 179 m (587 ft)
- Lowest elevation: 114 m (374 ft)
- Population (2022): 3,740
  - Density: 1,350/km^{2} (3,480/sq mi)
- Time zone: UTC+01:00 (CET)
  - Summer (DST): UTC+02:00 (CEST)
- Postal code: 78150
- ^{1} French Land Register data, which excludes lakes, ponds, glaciers > 1 km^{2} (0.386 sq mi or 247 acres) and river estuaries.

Rocquencourt (French pronunciation: [ʁɔkɑ̃kuʁ]) is a former commune in the Yvelines department in the Île-de-France in north-central France. On 1 January 2019, it was merged into the new commune Le Chesnay-Rocquencourt. It is about 4 kilometres (2.5 mi) north-west of Versailles and 19 kilometres (12 mi) west of center Paris.

The commune is mainly known as the location of a research unit of INRIA (in the Domaine de Voluceau, formerly Camp Voluceau, used by SHAPE) as well as a freeway exchange known as the Rocquencourt Triangle (triangle de Rocquencourt, junction of the A12 autoroute and the A13 autoroute), which is often mentioned in traffic news.

== History ==
On 1 July 1815, Napoleon's Grande Armée fought its last battle in Rocquencourt and Le Chesnay. After the defeat of Waterloo on 18 June 1815, Grouchy's army withdrew to Paris via Namur and Dinant, reaching Paris on 29 June, a few days before the Prussians, who camped at Versailles.

While negotiating the final armistice, Exelmans was ordered to attack the Prussians at Versailles on 1 July 1815. Under attack the Prussians retreated from Versailles and headed east, but were blocked by the French at Vélizy. They failed to re-enter Versailles and headed for Saint-Germain-en-Laye. Their first squadron came under fire at the entrance of Rocquencourt and attempted to escape through the fields. They were forced into a small, narrow street in Le Chesnay and killed or captured. However, the main body of the Prussian army succeeded in reaching Saint-Germain. (From Presentation of Rocquencourt.)

== Points of interest ==
- Arboretum de Chèvreloup

== See also ==
- Communes of the Yvelines department
