= Mapa pintado en papel europeo y aforrado en el indiano =

Mesoamerican document

- Musée de l'Homme, Paris

The Mapa pintado en papel europeo y aforrado en el indiano (Spanish for "map painted on European paper and lined in the Indian (i.e. amatl)"; abbreviated MPEAI) or Mapa de los linderos de Cuauhtinchan y Totomihuacan ("map of the boundaries of Cuauhtinchan and Totomihuacan") is a Mesoamerican pictorial document, concerning a land dispute between the altepetl of Cuauhtinchan and Totomihuacan. It is currently in the Musée de l'Homme in Paris.

== See also ==
- Historia Tolteca-Chichimeca
- Mapa de Cuauhtinchan No. 1, No. 2, No. 3 and No. 4
