= Henri Victor Vallois =

Henri Victor Vallois (11 April 1889 – 27 August 1981) was a French anthropologist and paleontologist. He was one of the editors in chief of the Revue d'Anthropologie from 1932 to 1970, and became director of the Musée de l'Homme in 1950.

== Bibliography ==
- Les hommes fossiles, éléments de paléontologie humaine, 1920
- Anthropologie de la population française, 1943
- Les races humaines, PUF, collection Que sais-je ?, 1944

== See ==
- Interview d'Henri Victor Vallois (pdf) por Jean-Pierre Bocquet-Appel (director de investigaciones de CNRS) 15 de febrero de 1981.
