= Gothenburg Botanical Garden =

Botanical garden in Gothenburg, Sweden

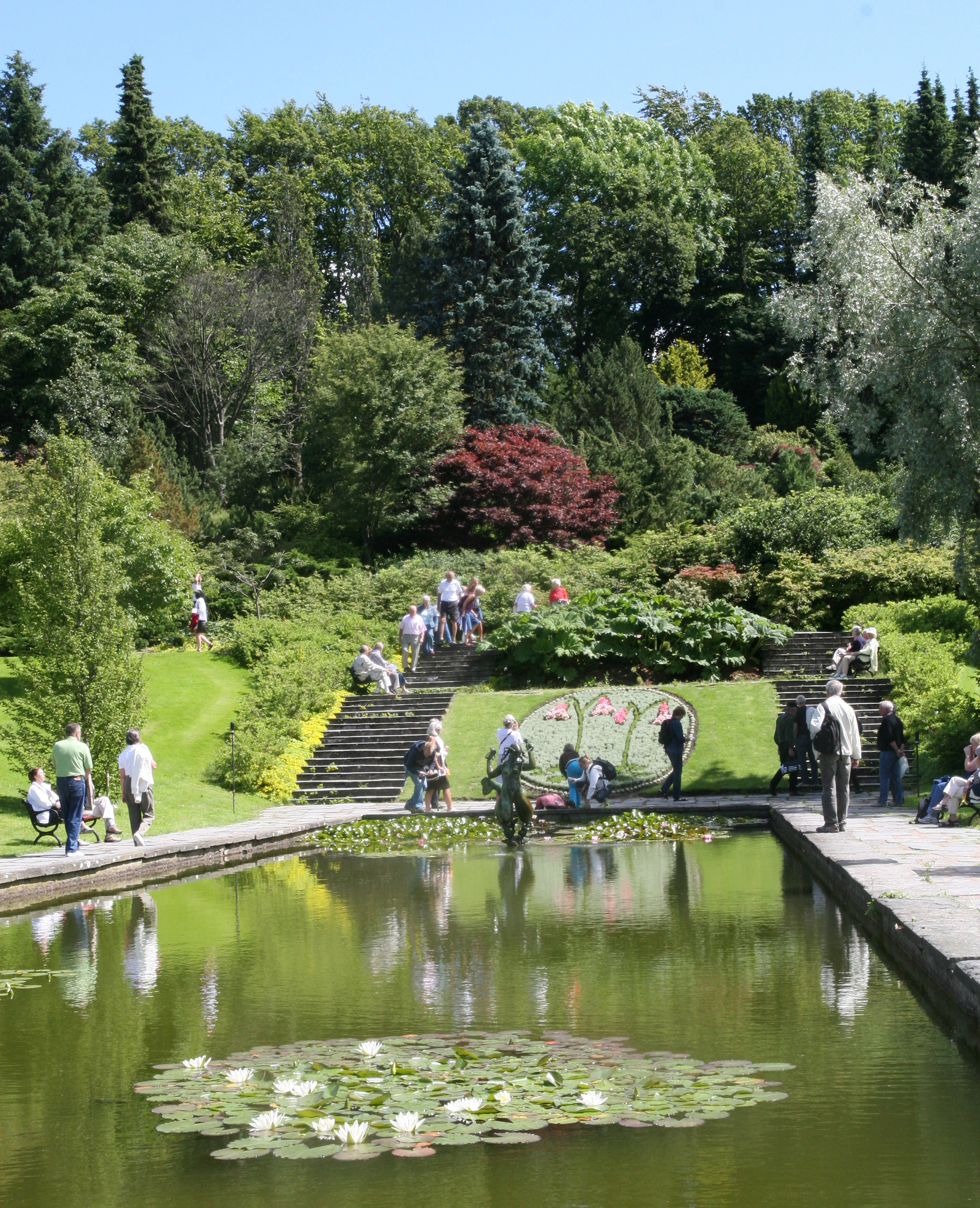
- The mirror pond at the entrance of Gothenburg Botanical Garden
- Interactive map of Gothenburg Botanical Garden
- Type: Botanical
- Location: Gothenburg, Sweden
- Coordinates: 57.6808°N 11.9546°E
- Area: 175 hectares (430 acres)
- Opened: 1923
- Owner: Västra Götaland Regional Council
- Visitors: more than 500,000 per year
- Status: Open year round
- Species: > 16,000
- Website: www.botaniska.se

The Gothenburg Botanical Garden (Swedish: Göteborgs botaniska trädgård) is located in Gothenburg, Sweden, and is one of the larger botanical gardens in Europe.

== History ==
The Gothenburg Botanical Garden is situated in a formerly completely rural area, where earlier a great country estate named Stora Änggården was located. The garden was initially funded by a donation from the Charles Felix Lindberg Foundation, in special memory of Charles Felix Lindberg himself. Lindberg was a Swedish businessman and donor, who died in 1909.

The Gothenburg City Council took the initiative to the botanical garden in 1912. The decision was finally taken in 1915 and work started in 1916. The park was opened to the public in 1919 (the Woodlands) and in 1923 (the cultivated areas). It was first planned as "a field for experimentation and biological demonstrations, and a nature park". Stora Änggården was built in 1812 and renovated under the supervision of the architect Sigfrid Ericson in 1919 and is now used as staff residence.

The Gothenburg Botanical Garden was inaugurated in 1923 when Gothenburg celebrated its 300th anniversary.

One of the prominent botanists who created the garden was Carl Skottsberg, who made several research trips around the globe to collect the rare plants of the garden. He was appointed as the first director, and worked from 1919 until 1948. The road outside the Main Entrance is named after him (Carl Skotttsbergs gata).

Donations from many sources have played a vital role in the financing of the garden, including financing the construction of the Office Building. The Office Building was designed by the Swedish architect Arvid Bjerke and completed in 1926. A wing was added in 1936 to house the herbarium. Nathan Petter Herman Persson (1893–1978), was a Swedish doctor and botanist (bryology), who worked as curator in the herbarium between 1947 and 1969.

Land was donated by the city and by private persons. An adjacent plot of land was donated by the city to University of Gothenburg for the construction of the Department of Biology and Environmental Sciences buildings, to the right seen from the Main Entrance. They were designed by the architects Stig Hansson and Walter Kiessling and completed in 1971. In 1975 The Woodlands containing the arboretum with a collection of exotic trees were declared as a nature reserve in 1975 and was named Änggårdsbergen.

The City of Gothenburg handed over the operation of the garden to Region Västra Götaland Regional Council in 1998.

== Description ==
Map of Gothenburg Botanical Garden: 1. Entrance area, 2. The shop, 3. Gramina et Flores, 4. Greenhouses, 5. Bulbs, 6. Kitchen Garden, 7. Herb Garden, 8. Bamboo Thicket, 9. Perennials, 10. Restaurant and café, 11. Woodlands, 12. Rhododendrons, 13. Rock garden, 14. Japanese Glade.

The total area is 175 hectares (ca 430 acres), of which most constitutes the nature reserve, Änggårdsbergen, including an arboretum.

The garden proper is about 40 hectares and there are 16,000 different species. The Rock Garden has received two stars in the Michelin Green Guide. Other sights worth seeing are the Rhododendron Valley, the Japanese Glade and the greenhouses with about 4,000 various plants, including some 1,500 orchids, a remarkable tufa apartment and the rare Easter Island tree, Sophora toromiro.

The park is unique in Sweden since it is independent of the city university. Currently it is one of the larger botanical gardens in Europe, with its 175 hectares, which include a wild nature reserve in the Änggårdsbergen hills. This reserve is also the site of the garden's arboretum with copses of trees from many parts of the world, in scientifically ordered collections. The cultivated part of the garden is about 40 hectares in area, of which about half consists of beds of plants. There are also extensive lawns and shrubberies. The symbol of the garden is a white wood anemone. These flowers carpet the valleys of the Woodlands and the Nature Reserve in the spring.

== Park, greenhouses and buildings ==
The topography of the botanical garden is very varied, much of it consisting of hilly terrain which lends itself naturally to boundaries drawn between different layouts with contrasting vegetation. The huge and dramatic rock garden with its 5,000 species from different continents is internationally acknowledged. Nearby is the greenly peaceful Japanese Glade where valuable plants can be seen that were collected and brought in the 1950s by former curator Tor Nitzelius straight from their wild habitats in East Asia to the botanical garden in Gothenburg.

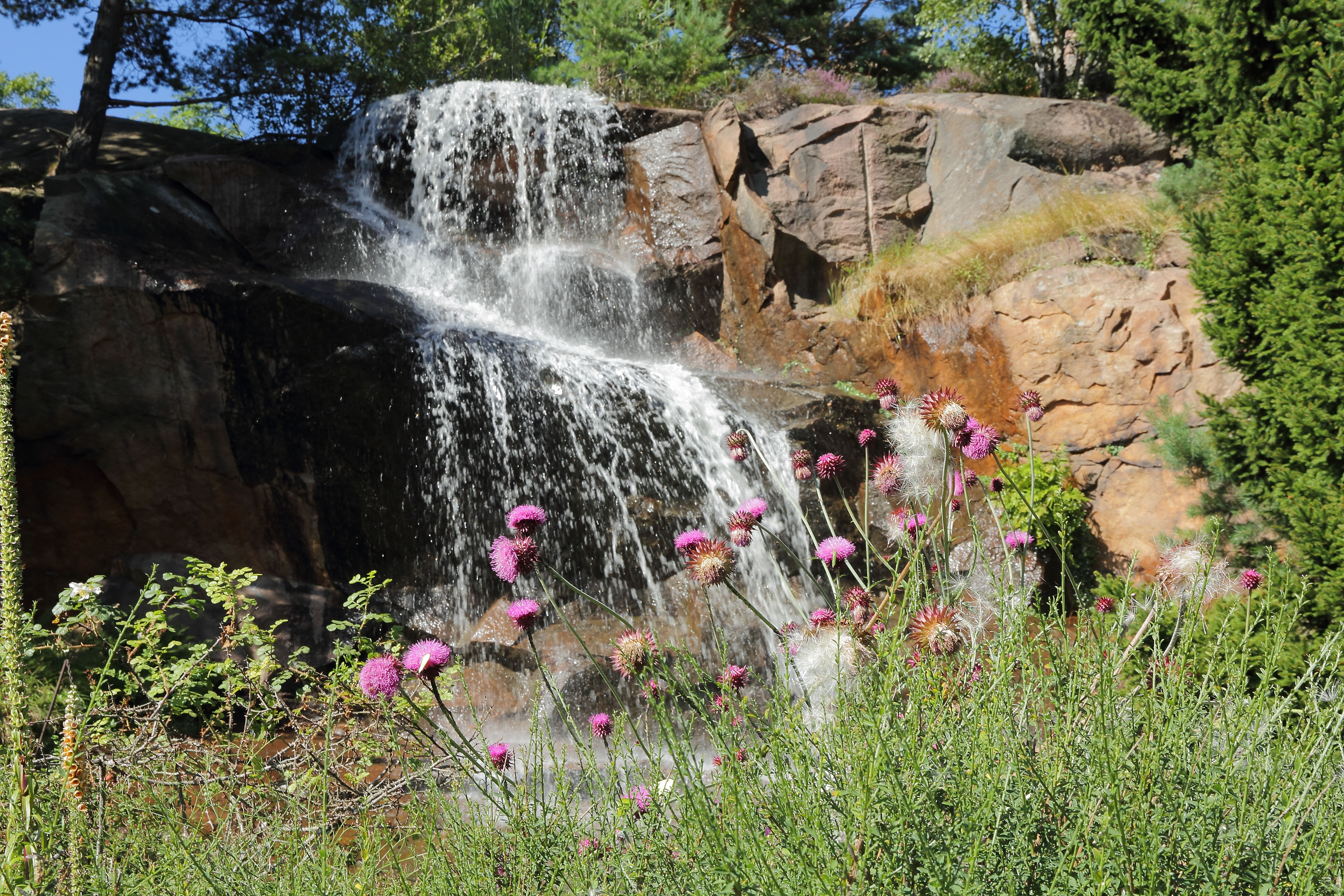
The Rock Garden at the Gothenburg Botanical Garden

The stock of over 500 species and cultivated varieties of Rhododendron offer a gorgeous, scented spectacle in the early summer. At different times of the year visitors may also enjoy the world's largest collection of bulbs and tuberous plants brought here straight from their wild habitats. The pretty Herb Garden, the lush beds of perennials and not least the Kitchen Garden with its crop rotation and typically Swedish syringa arbour are all interesting in their special ways. The Gothenburg Botanical Garden has been well to the fore with a new outlook on how to grow annual plants; the so-called summer blooming concept.

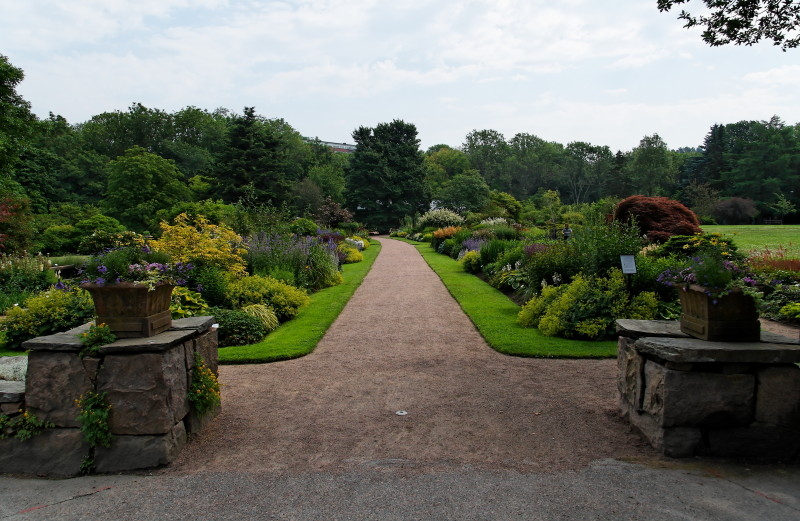
Perennials

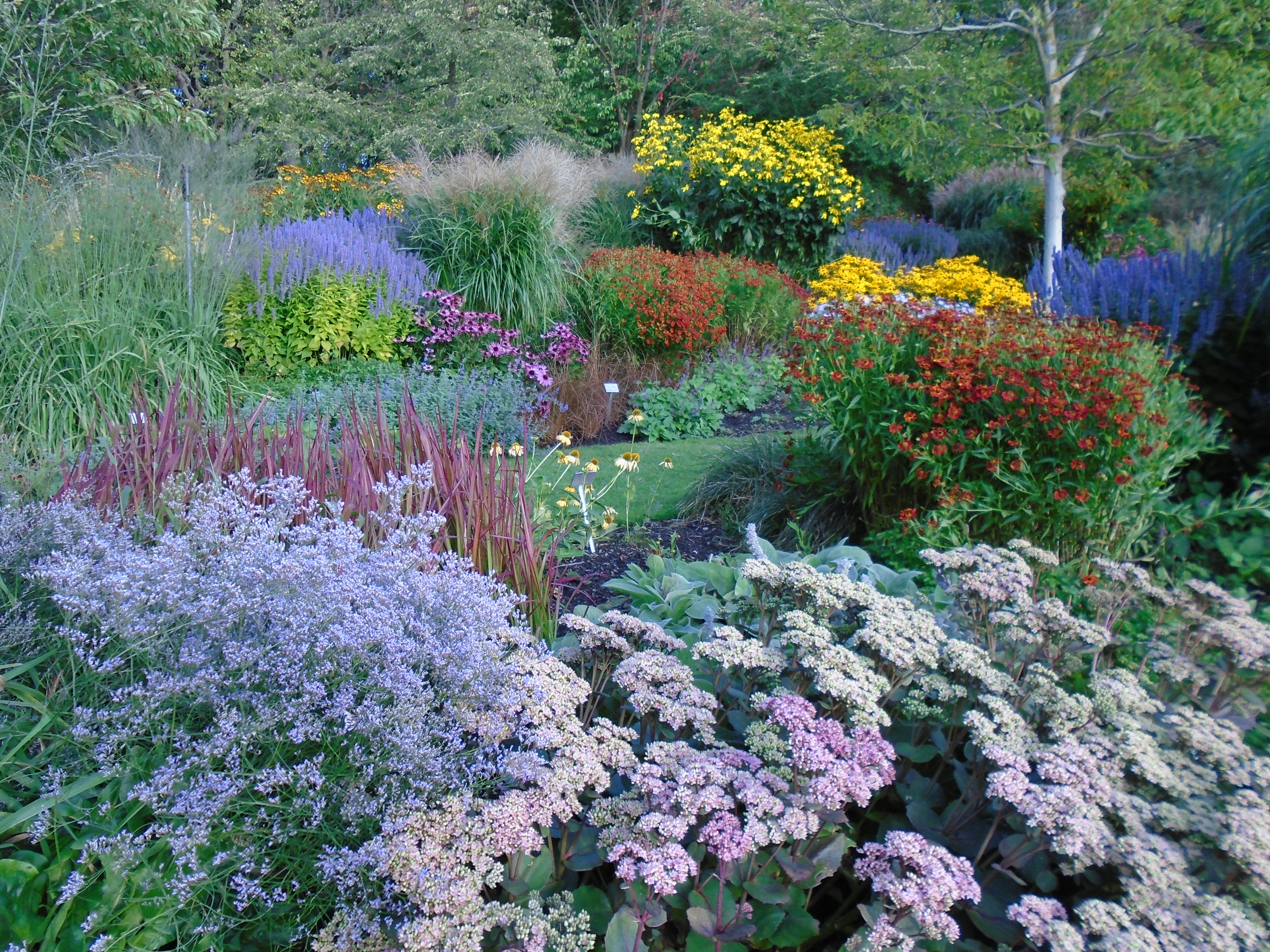
Perennials in bloom

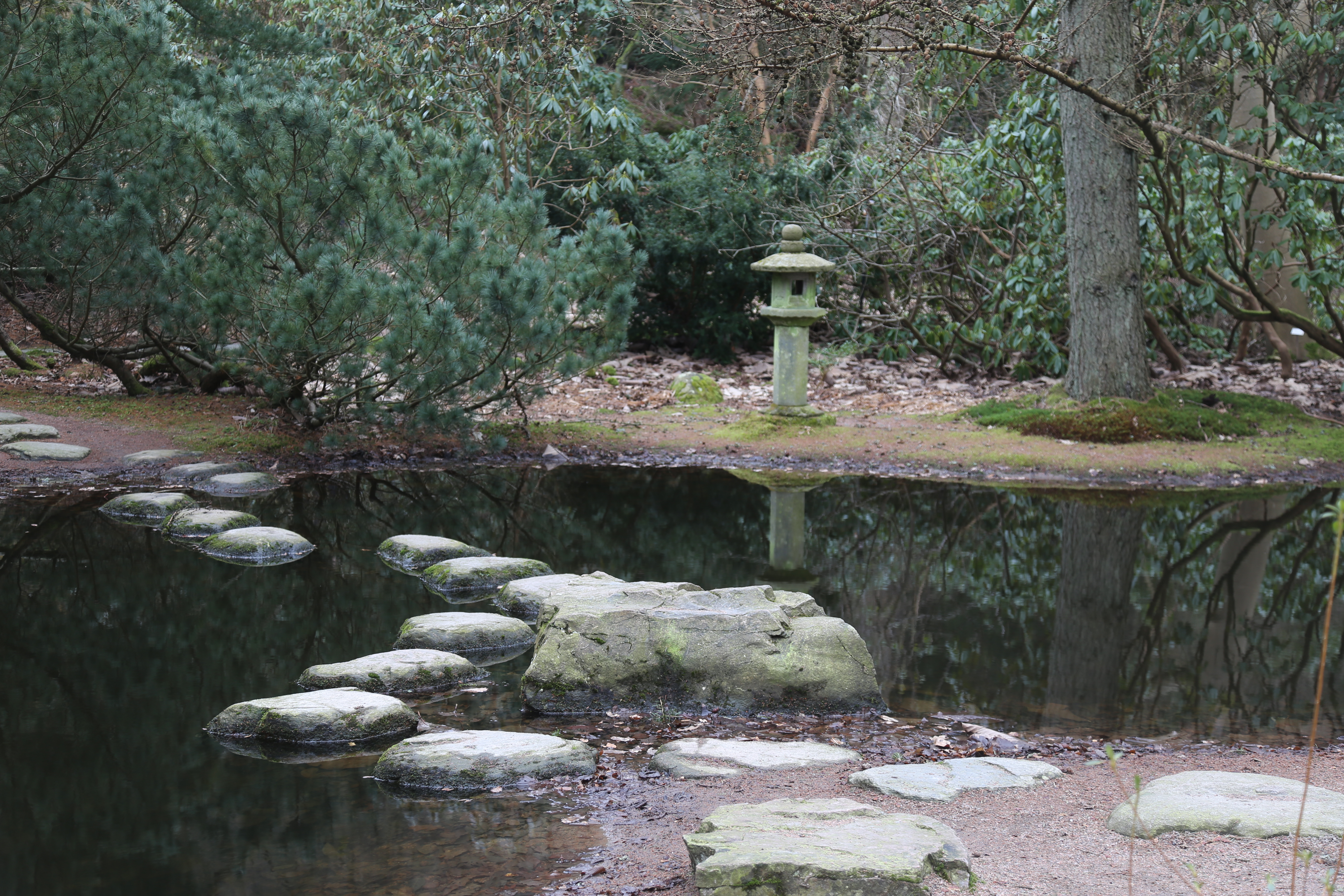
Japanese Glade

As many as 16,000 plant species can be seen out-of-doors as well as 4,000 species in the greenhouses. Among them are Sweden's finest collection of 1,500 orchids and the unique Toromiro Tree (Sophora toromiro) from Easter Island. This tree has become extinct in its natural habitat, but has survived in cultivated form thanks to the efforts of the Gothenburg Botanical Garden.

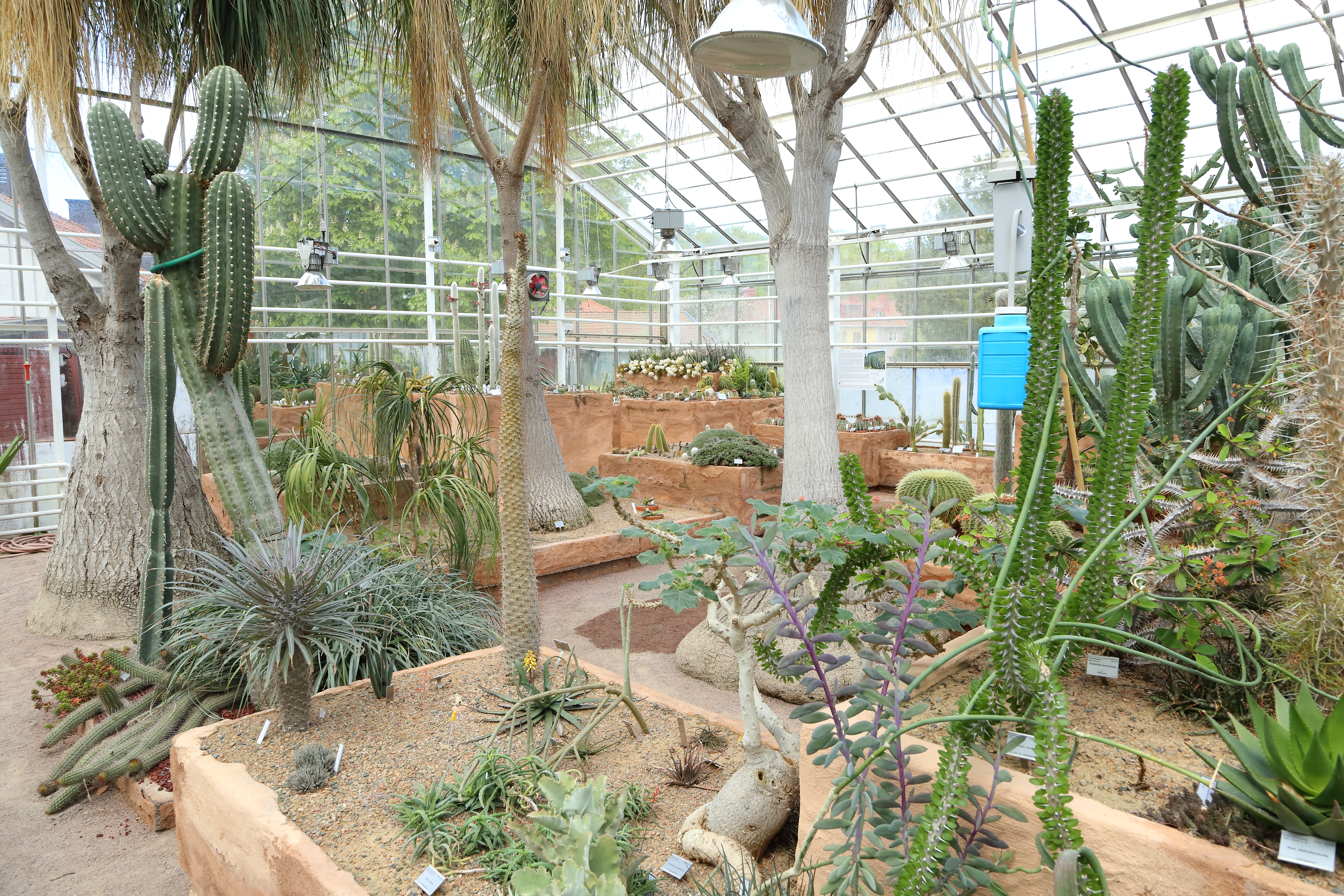
Succulents in the greenhouse

The yellow-painted country house Stora Änggården with its formal garden lies just beyond the greenhouses. It is used as a staff residence, as is the timbered Boatsman's Cottage, also known as the Blue House. Built in 1794, it was originally situated in the old harbour area of Gothenburg, below Stigbergstorget in the residential area of Majorna. In 1917 it was taken down and rebuilt two years later in its present place near the Bamboo Thickets.

The summerhouse in the Herb Garden is from the late eighteenth century. It was designed by the city engineer in Gothenburg Bengt Wilhelm Carlberg for the garden of his own country house, Kärralund. It was rebuilt in the botanical garden in 1959 after having stood for a time in a garden between the Röhsska Museum and the present-day HDK (School of Design and Crafts).

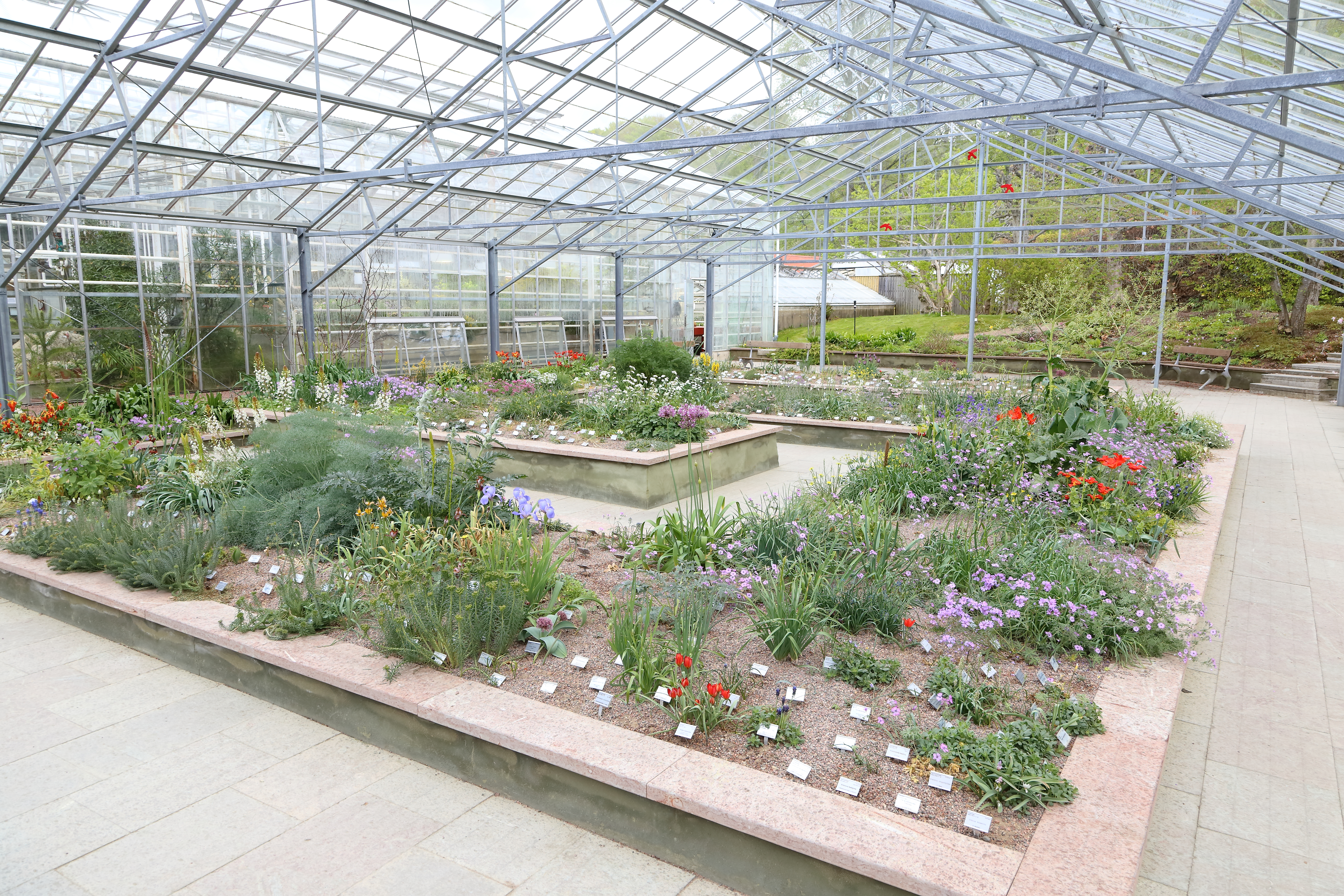
Bulb garden

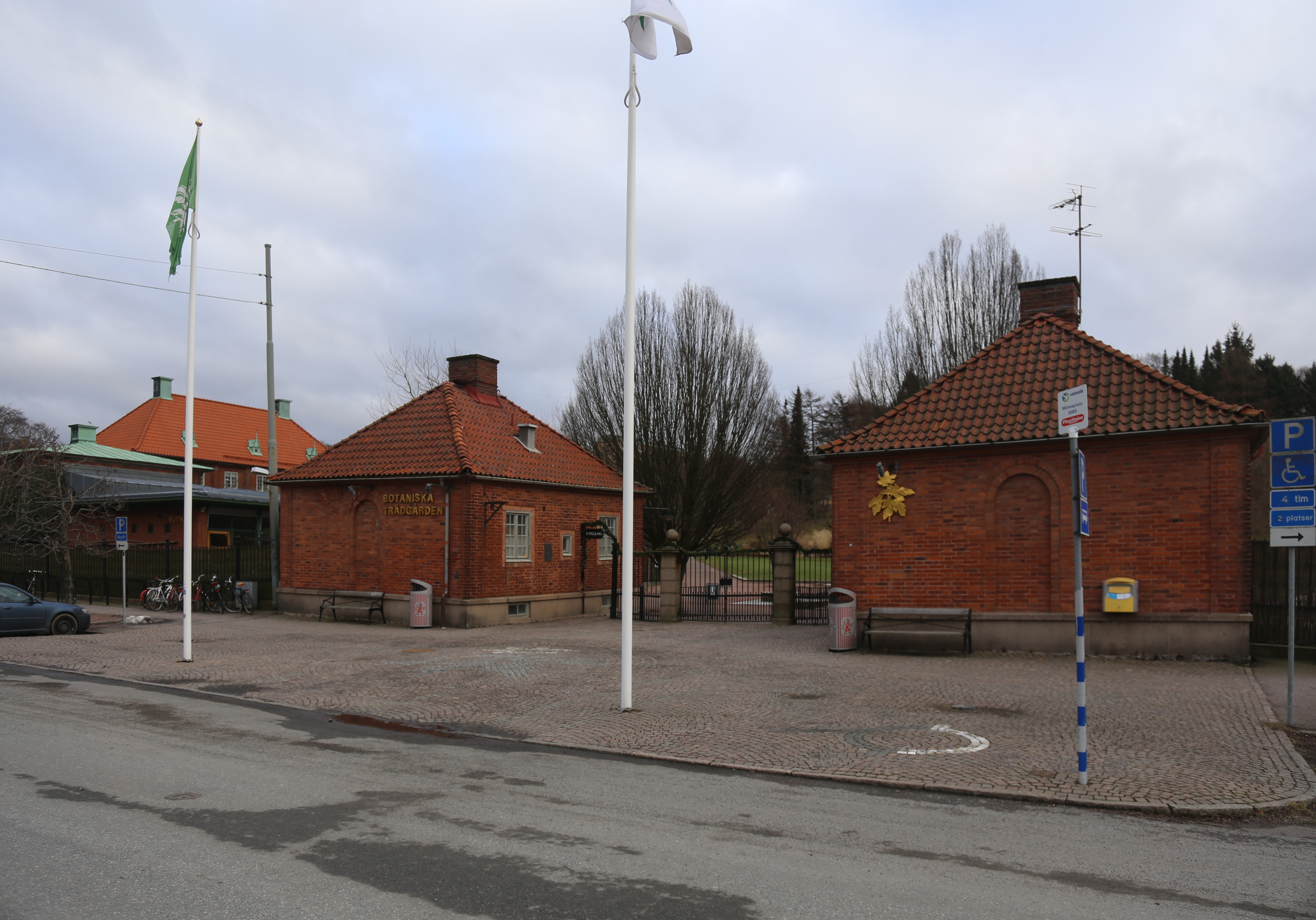
The entrance at Carl Scottsbergs gata

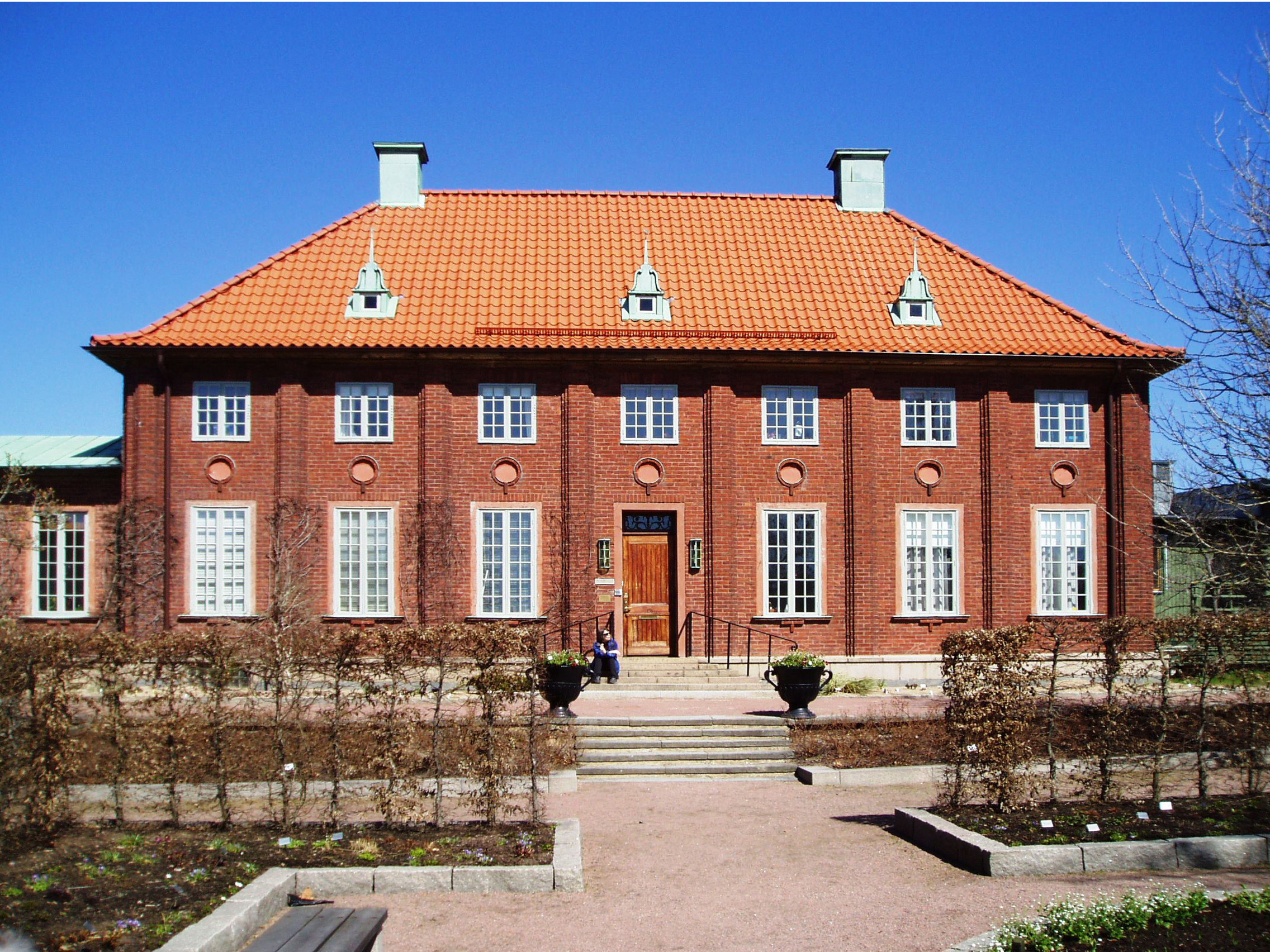
The office building

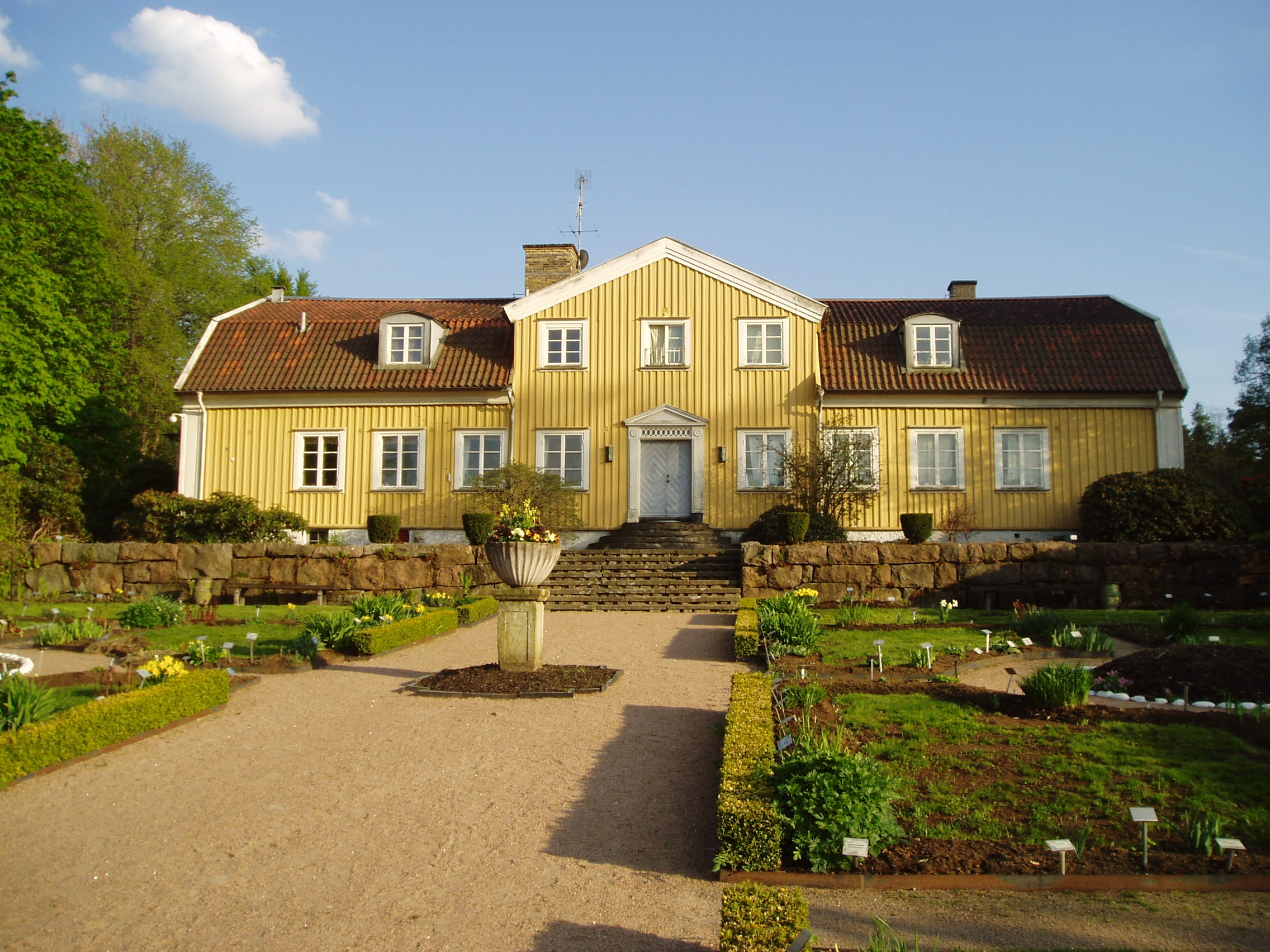
Stora Änggården, staff residence

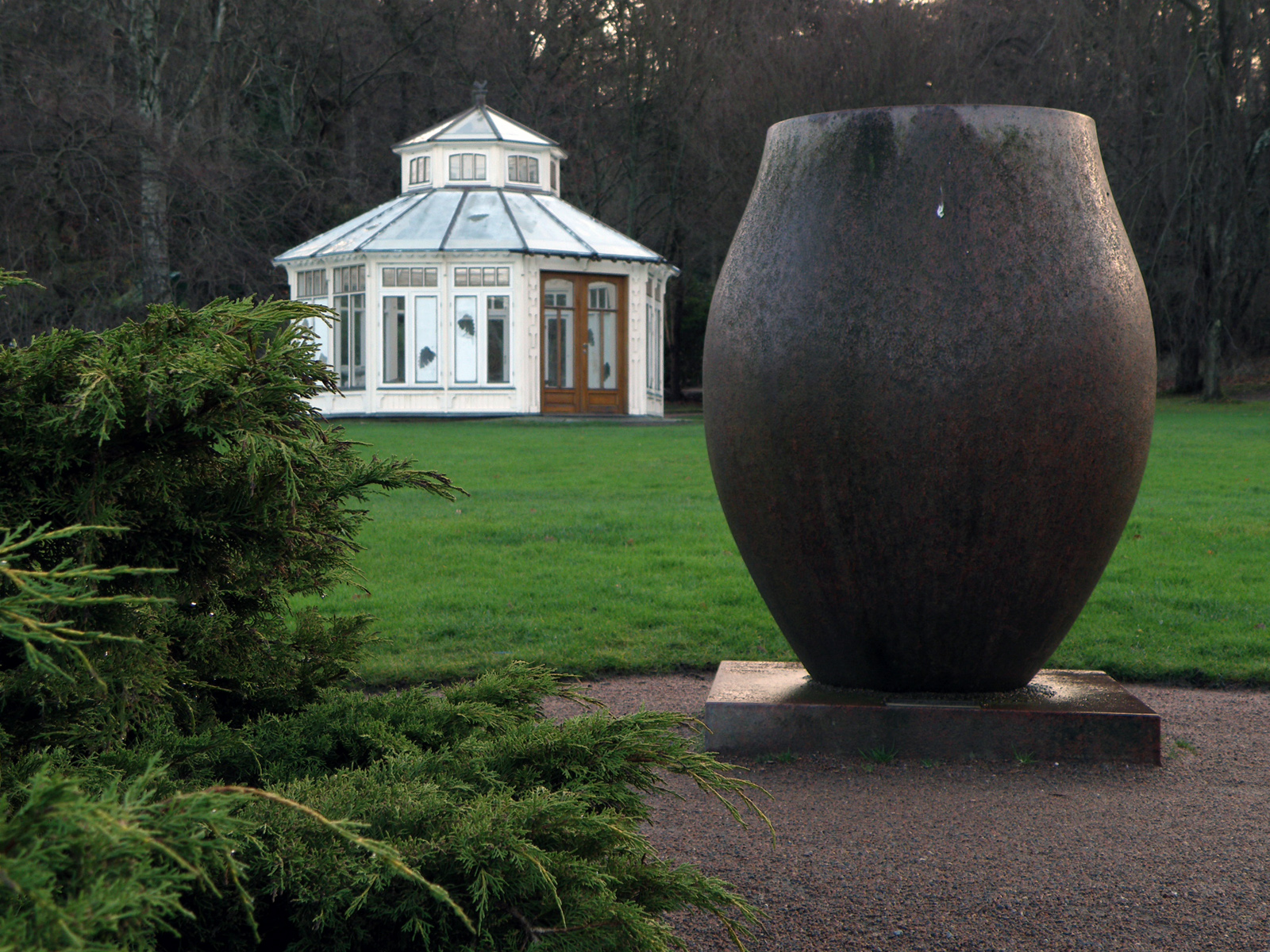
The gazebo

== Awards ==
In 2003 the Gothenburg Botanical Garden was voted the loveliest park in Sweden, in a version of the international poll initiated by Briggs & Stratton, one of the leading manufacturers of garden machinery. It was the first time the competition had been arranged in Sweden.

The botanical garden has two stars in the Michelin Green Guide.
