= Le Chesnay-Rocquencourt =

Commune in Île-de-France, France

- Commune
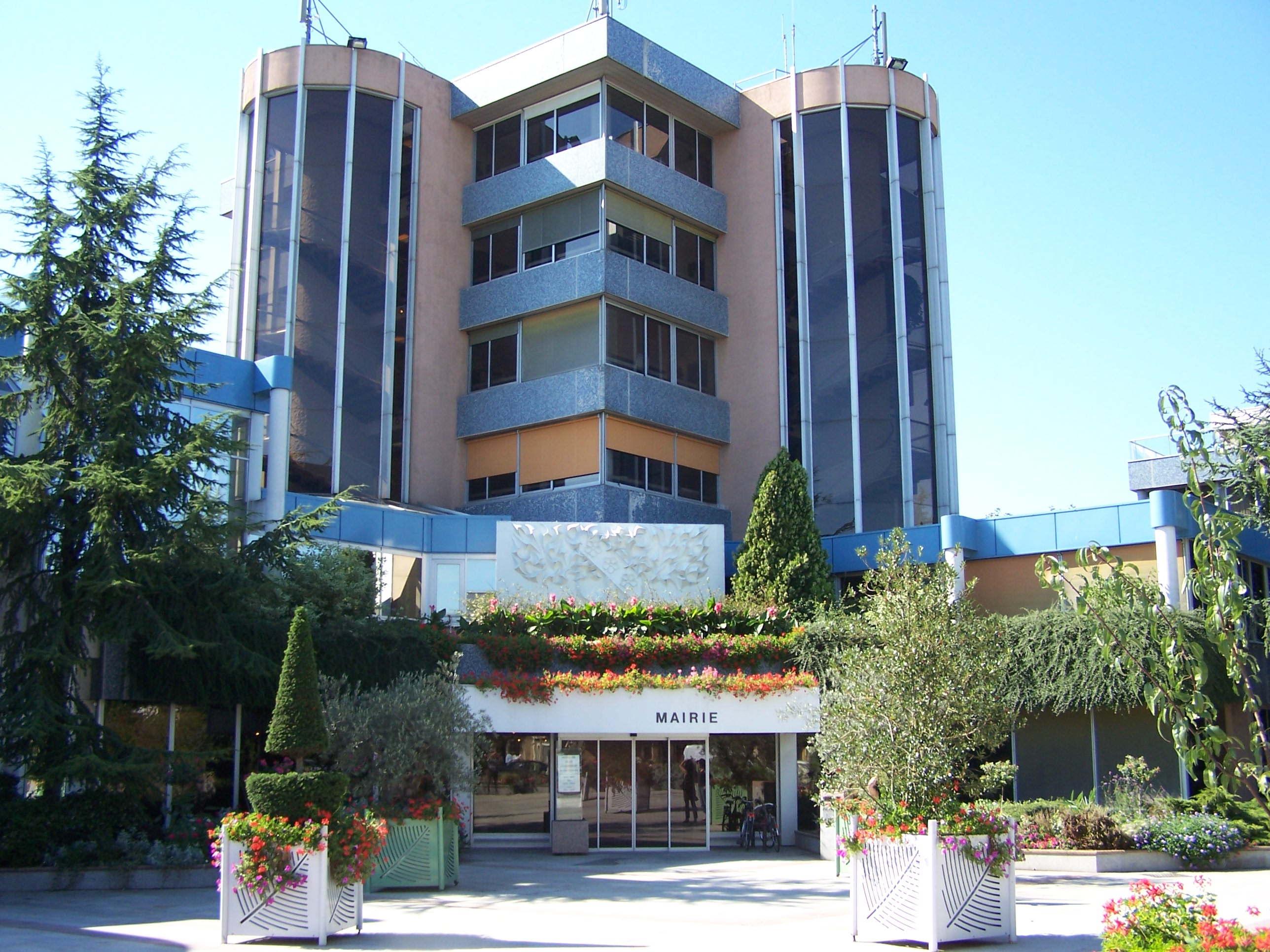
- Town hall
- Location of Le Chesnay-Rocquencourt
- Location within France Location within Île-de-France (region)
- Coordinates: 48°49′16″N 2°07′52″E
- Country: France
- Region: Île-de-France
- Department: Yvelines
- Arrondissement: Versailles
- Canton: Le Chesnay-Rocquencourt
- Intercommunality: CA Versailles Grand Parc

Government
  - Mayor (2020–2026): Richard Delepierre
- Area^{1}: 7.02 km^{2} (2.71 sq mi)
- Elevation: 145 m (476 ft)
- Highest elevation: 179 m (587 ft)
- Lowest elevation: 113 m (371 ft)
- Population (2023): 30,689
  - Density: 4,370/km^{2} (11,300/sq mi)
- Demonym(s): Chesnaycourtois (masculine); Chesnaycourtoise (feminine)
- Time zone: UTC+01:00 (CET)
  - Summer (DST): UTC+02:00 (CEST)
- INSEE/Postal code: 78158 /78150
- ^{1} French Land Register data, which excludes lakes, ponds, glaciers > 1 km^{2} (0.386 sq mi or 247 acres) and river estuaries.

Le Chesnay-Rocquencourt (French pronunciation: [lə ʃɛnɛ ʁɔkɑ̃kuʁ]) is a commune in the western suburbs of Paris, in the department of Yvelines.

It was established on 1 January 2019 from the amalgamation of the communes of Le Chesnay and Rocquencourt.

== Population ==
Populations of the area corresponding with the commune of Le Chesnay-Rocquencourt at 1 January 2025.

Historical population
Year	Pop.	±% p.a.
1968	15,070	—
1975	26,815	+8.58%
1982	31,681	+2.41%
1990	33,413	+0.67%
1999	31,748	−0.57%
2007	32,672	+0.36%
2012	32,196	−0.29%
2017	31,164	−0.65%
2023	30,689	−0.26%
INSEE
