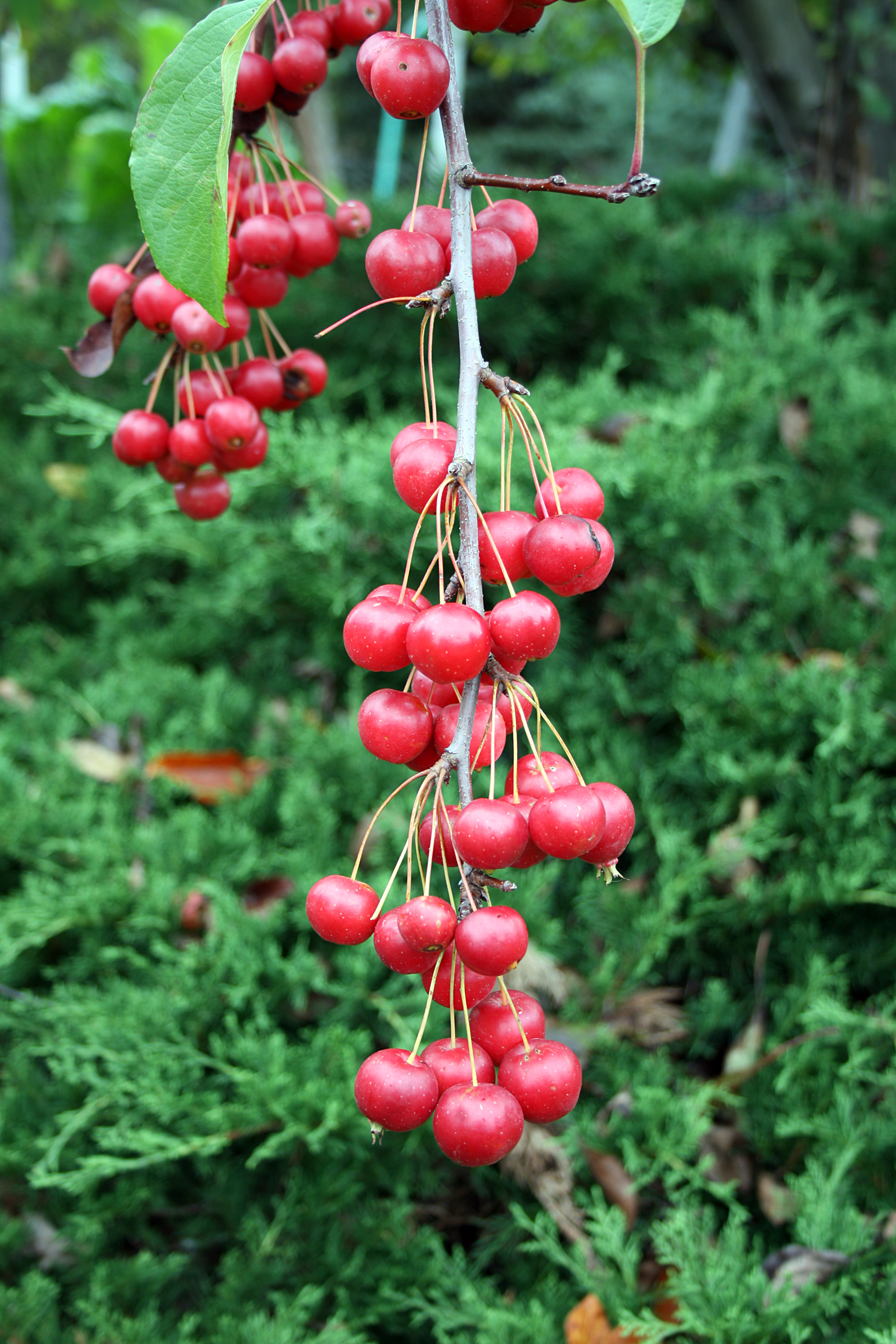

Conservation status
- Data Deficient (IUCN 3.1)

Scientific classification
- Kingdom: Plantae
- Clade: Tracheophytes
- Clade: Angiosperms
- Clade: Eudicots
- Clade: Rosids
- Order: Rosales
- Family: Rosaceae
- Genus: Malus
- Species: M. sikkimensis

Binomial name
- Malus sikkimensis (Wenz.) Koehne ex C.K.Schneid.

Synonyms
- List: Malus baccata subsp. sikkimensis (Wenz.) Likhonos in Trudy Prikl. Bot. 52(3): 28 (1974); Pyrus pashia var. sikkimensis Wenz. in Linnaea 38: 49 (1873); Pyrus sikkimensis (Wenz.) Hook.f. in Fl. Brit. India 2: 373 (1878); Sinomalus sikkimensis (Wenz.) Rushforth in Phytologia 100: 245 (2018)

= Malus sikkimensis =

Species of apple tree

Malus sikkimensis is a rare species of apple known by the common name Sikkim crabapple. Its Chinese name is xi jin hai tang (锡金海棠).

It bears white and pink flowers and dark red fruit. It was first published in Gatt. Pomac. in 1890.

It is native to China, Nepal, Bhutan, Assam, Tibet and parts of India, where it is threatened due to loss of habitat.

The edible fruits are a primary source (within India and the Himalayas) of dietary dihydrochalcones and flavonoids (both organic compounds). An extract of the fruit has potential for protective and therapeutic properties.
