= Canton of Le Chesnay-Rocquencourt =

Coordinates: 48.82°N 2.13°E

The canton of Le Chesnay-Rocquencourt (before 2021: Le Chesnay) is an administrative division of the Yvelines department, northern France. Its borders were modified at the French canton reorganisation which came into effect in March 2015. Its seat is in Le Chesnay-Rocquencourt.

It consists of the following communes:

1. Bailly
2. Bougival
3. La Celle-Saint-Cloud
4. Le Chesnay-Rocquencourt
5. Louveciennes
