= Haute Touche Zoological Park =

Zoo and safari park in Obterre, France

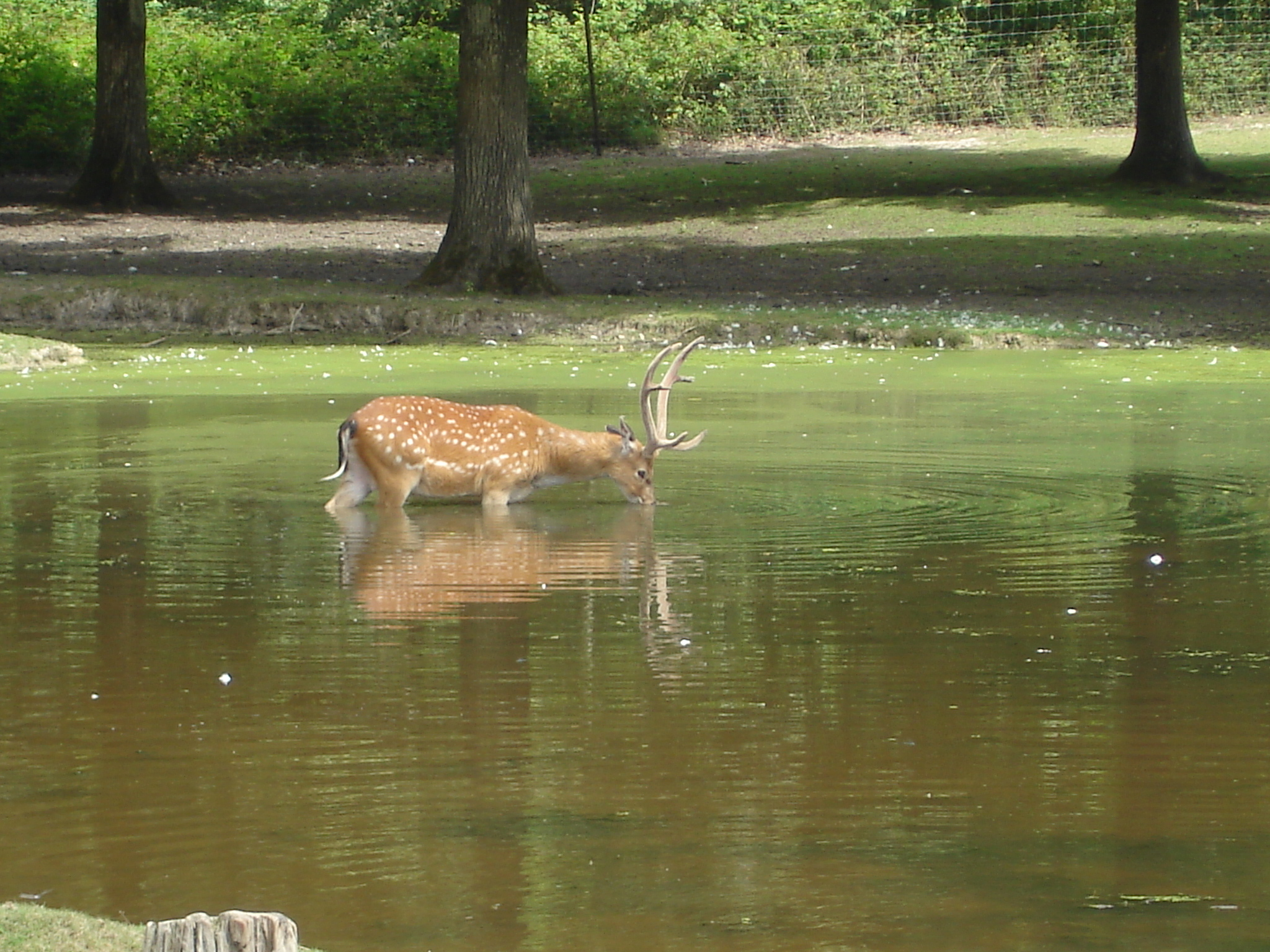
- Sika deer in Haute Touche Zoological Park
- Interactive map of Haute Touche Zoological Park
- 46.8852°N 1.0763°E
- Date opened: 1958 (in 1980 to the general public)
- Land area: 480 hectares (1,200 acres)
- No. of animals: 920
- No. of species: 50
- Annual visitors: 60,000
- Website: https://www.reservedelahautetouche.fr

The Haute Touche Zoological Park (French: Réserve zoologique de la Haute-Touche, pronounced [ʁezɛʁv zɔɔlɔʒik də la ot tuʃ]) is a zoo and safari park in France. It is located in Obterre, and is part of the Muséum national d'histoire naturelle. The zoo was established in 1958 and opened to the public in 1980. It is located in the heart of the Regional Natural Park of Brenne in the territory of the municipality of Obterre in the department of Indre, in a forest of 480 hectares (1,200 acres) of which 100 hectares (250 acres) are open to the public. The zoo has animals in semi-freedom, in relatively large enclosures. Visitors can see about 920 animals from 85 species and five continents, including a remarkable collection of deer. The park includes several sections, including European fauna such as Alpine ibex, European bison, gray wolves and wild boar, threatened ungulates such as Formosan sika deer, Père David's deer and scimitar oryx, and general fauna from the Americas, Asia and Africa such as big cats, hyenas, baboons, lemurs, giraffe, antelopes and birds.
