= Papercutz (publisher) =

American graphic novel publisher

- Parent company: Mad Cave Studios
- Founded: 2005; 21 years ago
- Founder: Terry Nantier; Jim Salicrup
- Headquarters location: New York City, U.S.
- Distribution: Simon & Schuster
- Key people: Stefan Petrucha; Michael Petranek
- Imprints: Super Genius
- Official website: Official website

Papercutz Graphic Novels is an American publisher of family-friendly comic books and graphic novels, mostly based on licensed properties such as Nancy Drew, the Hardy Boys, and Lego Ninjago. Papercutz has also published new volumes of the Golden Age-era comics series Classics Illustrated and Tales from the Crypt. In recent years they have begun publishing English translations of European (mostly Franco-Belgian) all-ages comics, including The Smurfs and Asterix. They publish several titles through their imprint Super Genius.

== Company history ==
Terry Nantier (born 1957), founder of NBM Publishing, established Papercutz in 2005, along with comics industry veteran Jim Salicrup, who became the editor-in-chief. Their intent was to produce comics and graphic novels appropriate for children, which was lacking in the industry at the time. Writer Stefan Petrucha came on board as well; he has worked on such titles as Nancy Drew, Papercutz Slices, and Rio. Associate editor Michael Petranek joined Papercutz in 2008.

Mad Cave Studios acquired Papercutz in 2022.

== Publication history ==
In the spring of 2005 Papercutz launched with the publication of two three-part comic book series; Nancy Drew's The Demon of River Heights and The Hardy Boys' The Ocean of Osyria. Both series were both collected into 92-page graphic novels, becoming the first titles in the Nancy Drew Graphic Novel and The Hardy Boys Graphic Novel series respectively. All other titles in both series have been made in graphic novel format only and are published every three months. The Nancy Drew graphic novels are written by Stefan Petrucha, and the first series was illustrated in manga-style artwork by Sho Murase. The character's graphic novel incarnation has been described as "a fun, sassy, modern-day teen who is still hot on the heels of criminals." Creators on the Hardy Boys series included writer Scott Lobdell (Hardy Boys), and artist Lea Hernandez. In 2010, Papercutz relaunched both titles, with the Hardy Boys series bringing on a new creative team of Gerry Conway and Paulo Henrique.

In 2006, Papercutz published an English translation of the Italian nonfiction graphic novel The Life of Pope John Paul II, by Alessandro Mainard and Werner Maresta.

In 2007, Papercutz acquired the Classics Illustrated license and began publishing comic book adaptations of classic children's novels. Combining reprints of some of the original titles with new modern adaptations, contributors to the series include Rick Geary, Kyle Baker, Tom Mandrake, Jill Thompson, Dan Spiegle, Peter Kuper, Gahan Wilson, Ricardo Villagrán, Mike Vosburg, and Mike Ploog. A second series, Classics Illustrated Deluxe, features many French artists.

From 2007–2010 Papercutz published a new series of original Tales from the Crypt comics. The first issue was published in June 2007, with a cover drawn by Kyle Baker. All three of EC Comics' "horror hosts" (The GhouLunatics) appear in the issue, drawn by Rick Parker. Contributors to subsequent issues included well-known horror talents Joe R. Lansdale and his brother John L. Lansdale, Don McGregor, husband and wife team James Romberger and Marguerite Van Cook, Mort Todd, Neil Kleid, Arie Kaplan, and Chris Noeth. Controversy erupted in 2008 when U.S. vice presidential candidate Sarah Palin was featured on a cover, attacking the horror hosts with a hockey stick, published with a letter from William Gaines' daughter Cathy Gaines Mifsud commenting on censorship. Papercutz published 13 issues (9 graphic novels) of Tales from the Crypt, with the last issue being published September 28, 2010.

In 2009, Papercutz launched Papercutz Slices, a popular culture parody series written by Stefan Petrucha and illustrated by Rick Parker. Targets of the series have included Diary of a Wimpy Kid, the Harry Potter books, Twilight, Percy Jackson & the Olympians, The Hunger Games, and The Walking Dead.

In July 2010, Papercutz began publishing The Smurfs comics, translated by Joe Johnson. Debuting with a special preview comic that contained the story "The Smurfnapper," Papercutz has released a large number of Smurfs graphic novels to date. The success of The Smurfs prompted Papercutz to publish more English translations of such Franco-Belgian comics series as Benny Breakiron, Dance Class, and Sybil the Backpack Fairy.

Since 2010 Papercutz has added a slate of new licensed properties to its graphic novel lines, including the Disney Fairies, Lego Ninjago, Garfield, Power Rangers, Rio, and Stardoll.

In 2024, Papercutz announced a new partnership with The Walt Disney Company to begin publishing titles based on Disney and Pixar IPs. These include new titles and reprints based on Turning Red, Inside Out, Encanto, Phineas and Ferb, Disney Fairies, Frozen, and 101 Dalmatian Street, with presumedly more unannounced titles in the works.

== Titles published ==
- 101 Dalmatian Street (2024–present)
- Annoying Orange (2012–2015)
- Barbie (2016–2019)
- Bionicle (2008–2010)
- Breadwinners (2015–2016)
- Disney Fairies (2010–present)
- Encanto (2024–present)
- Frozen (2024–present)
- Garfield & Company (2011–2013)
- Geronimo Stilton (2009–present)
- Gumby (2017–present)
- The Hardy Boys Graphic Novel series (2005–present) — originally written by Scott Lobdell; relaunched in 2010 with stories by Gerry Conway and art by Paulo Henrique
- Inside Out (2024–present)
- Lego Ninjago (2011–2014) — by Greg Farshtey and Paulo Henrique
- The Loud House (2016–present)
- The Casagrandes (2021–present)
- Melowy (2018–2022)
- Nancy Drew series (2005–present) — includes The Nancy Drew Diaries and Nancy Drew and the Clue Crew; written by Stefan Petrucha
- Nickelodeon Magazine series (2015–2016) — originally ran from 1993 to 2009; relaunched in 2015
- Papercutz Slices (2009–present) — by Stefan Petrucha and Rick Parker
  - Diary of a Stinky Dead Kid (2009)
  - Harry Potty and The Deathly Boring (2010)
  - Breaking Down (2011)
  - Percy Jerkson and The Ovolactovegetarians (2011)
  - The Hunger Pains (2012)
  - The Farting Dead (2013)
- Phineas and Ferb (2024–present)
- Power Rangers (2012–2014)
- Rabbids Invasion (2014–2015)
- Rio (2013–present) — by Stefan Petrucha and Paulo Henrique
- Sanjay and Craig (2015–2016)
- Stardoll (2013–present) — by JayJay Jackson
- Tales From The Crypt (2007–2010)
- Thea Stilton (2013–present)
- The Three Stooges (2012–present) — includes The Best of The Three Stooges
- Totally Spies! (2006–2007)
- Trolls (2016–2018)
- Turning Red (2024–present)
- Winx Club (2023–present)
- WWE Slam City (2014–2015) — by Mathias Triton and Alitha E. Martinez
- Zorro (2005–2007) — by Don McGregor and Sidney Lima

=== Classics Illustrated ===
- Classics Illustrated (2008–2014)
1. Great Expectations — adapted by Rick Geary; reprinted from Classics Illustrated #2 (First Comics, Feb. 1990)
2. The Invisible Man — adapted by Rick Geary; reprinted from Classics Illustrated #20 (First Comics, Mar. 1991)
3. Through the Looking Glass — adapted by Kyle Baker; reprinted from Classics Illustrated #3 (First Comics, Feb. 1990)
4. The Raven and Other Poems — illustrated by Gahan Wilson; reprinted from Classics Illustrated #1 (First Comics, Feb. 1990)
5. Hamlet — adapted by Steven Grant and Tom Mandrake; reprinted from Classics Illustrated #5 (First Comics, Mar. 1990)
6. The Scarlet Letter — adapted by P. Craig Russell and Jill Thompson; reprinted from Classics Illustrated #6 (First Comics, Mar. 1990)
7. Dr. Jekyll & Mr. Hyde — adapted by John K. Snyder III; reprinted from Classics Illustrated #8 (First Comics, Apr. 1990)
8. The Count of Monte Cristo — adapted by Steven Grant and Dan Spiegle; reprinted from Classics Illustrated #7 (First Comics, Apr. 1990)
9. The Jungle — adapted by Peter Kuper; reprinted from Classics Illustrated #27 (First Comics, June 1991)
10. Cyrano de Bergerac — adapted by Peter David and Kyle Baker; reprinted from Classics Illustrated #21 (First Comics, Mar. 1991)
11. The Devil's Dictionary and Other Works — adapted by Gahan Wilson; reprinted from Classics Illustrated #18 (First Comics, Feb. 1991)
12. The Island of Doctor Moreau — adapted by Steven Grant and Eric Vincent; reprinted from Classics Illustrated #12 (First Comics, Aug. 1990)
13. Ivanhoe — adapted by Mark Wayne Harris and Ray Lago; reprinted from Classics Illustrated #25 (First Comics, May 1991)
14. Wuthering Heights — adapted by Rick Geary; reprinted from Classics Illustrated #13 (First Comics, Oct. 1990)
15. The Call of the Wild — adapted by Charles Dixon and Ricardo Villagran; reprinted from Classics Illustrated #10 (First Comics, June 1990)
16. Kidnapped — adapted by Mike Vosburg
17. The Secret Agent — adapted by John K. Snyder III; reprinted from Classics Illustrated #19 (First Comics, Feb. 1991)
18. Aesop's Fables — adapted by Eric Vincent; reprinted from Classics Illustrated #26 (First Comics, June 1991)
19. The Adventures of Tom Sawyer — adapted by Mike Ploog; reprinted from Classics Illustrated #9 (First Comics, May 1990)
- Classics Illustrated Deluxe (2008–2014)
  - vol. 1: The Wind in the Willows (2008) — adapted by Michael Plessix
  - vol. 2: Tales from the Brothers Grimm (2008) — adapted by Mazan, Philip Petit, and Cecile Chicault
  - vol. 3: Frankenstein (2009) — adapted by Marion Mousse
  - vol. 4: The Adventures of Tom Sawyer (2009) — adapted by Jean-David Morvan, Frederique Voulyze, and Severine Le Fevebvre
  - vol. 5: Treasure Island (2010) — adapted by David Chauvel and Fred Simon; reprinted from L'Île au trésor, de Robert Louis Stevenson (Delcourt, 2007–2009)
  - vol. 6: The Three Musketeers (2011) — adapted by Jean-David Morvan, Michel Dufranne, and Rubén
  - vol. 7: Around the World in Eighty Days (2011) — adapted by Loïc Dauvillier and Aude Soleilhac
  - vol. 8: Oliver Twist (2012) — adapted by Loïc Dauvillier and Olivier Deloye
  - vol. 9: Scrooge: A Christmas Carol and "Mugby Junction" (2012) — adapted by Rodolphe and Estelle Meyrand
  - vol. 10: "The Murders in the Rue Morgue" and Other Tales (2013) — adapted by Jean-David Morvan, Corbeyran, Fabrice Druet, and Paul Marcel
  - vol. 11: The Sea-Wolf (2014) — adapted by Riff Reb's
  - vol. 12: The Monkey God (2014) — adapted by Jean-David Morvan, Yann Le Gal, and Jian Yi

=== Reprints/translations ===
- Ariol — by Emmanuel Guibert
- Asterix — by René Goscinny and Albert Uderzo
- Benny Breakiron — by Peyo
- Dance Class — by Béka (Bertrand Escaich & Caroline Roque) and Crip
- Ernest & Rebecca — by Guillaume Bianco and Antonello Dalena
- High Moon (Oct 2017) by David Gallaher and Steve Ellis
- Monster — by Lewis Trondheim
- Pussycat — by Peyo
- The Smurfs (2010–present) — by Peyo
- Sybil the Backpack Fairy — by Michel Rodrigue and Antonello Dalena
- Toto Trouble — by Thierry Coppée

== See also ==
- Toon Books
