= List of Taboo Tattoo episodes =

Cover of the first Blu-Ray volume of Taboo Tattoo being released by Avex Pictures, featuring Bluesy Fluesy.

Taboo Tattoo is an anime adaptation of the manga of the same title written and illustrated by Shinjirō. The series is produced by J.C.Staff and directed by Takashi Watanabe. It was broadcast between July 4, 2016, and September 19, 2016. The opening theme is "Belief" by May'n, while the ending theme is "EGOISTIC EMOTION" by idol unit TRIGGER, which is composed of Izzy's and Tōko's voice actors, Mikako Komatsu and Chika Anzai respectively. The program aired weekly on a number of Japanese channels which are TV Tokyo, AT-X and BS Japan while outside Japan, it was being simulcasted by Crunchyroll and Funimation released it on home video as part of the two companies' partnership.

== Episode list ==
| No. | Title | Directed by | Original release date |
|---|---|---|---|
| 1 | "Tattoo"; Transliteration: "Jumon" (Japanese: 呪紋) | Masahiro Fujii; Shinya Hasegawa | July 4, 2016 |
Seigi saves a homeless man from some thugs. The man repays him by sticking a strange rock on his right hand, giving him a tattoo, before wandering off. The next day, Seigi attracts the attention of a mysterious girl, who steals his cell phone and then attacks him in an abandoned building. The girl, Izzy, fills in Seigi on her own tattoo and the power it holds. The next few days, Izzy stalks Seigi around town, though both he and his friend Toko both notice her poor skills at tailing him. Suddenly, Seigi is attacked by an American mafioso with a tattoo of his own. After nearly being killed by the man, Seigi accidentally unleashes his own tattoo's power, defeating his attacker.
| 2 | "Surprise Attack"; Transliteration: "Kyūshū" (Japanese: 急襲) | Masahiro Fujii | July 11, 2016 |
Seigi awakens in his own room, where Izzy demands that he join her with his new power. Seigi is reluctant at first, though Izzy presses the issue the next day when she appears as a transfer student in his class. Reluctantly, Seigi accepts Izzy's offer to become part of the "Blue Moon" unit with her and Tom. Later, Seigi follows Izzy's hand-drawn map to a safehouse where Tom currently lives. Meanwhile, Princess Aryabahta takes the Kingdom of Selinistan from her parents in a bloody coup, sending a pair of "Brahmin" to Japan to hunt down the "triggerless tattoo." One of them attacks Izzy as she plants digital tripwires at school, the other takes possession of Toko, using her to stab Tom and attack Seigi.
| 3 | "Misery Loves Company"; Transliteration: "Dōbyōsōren" (Japanese: 同病相憐) | Masahiro Fujii | July 18, 2016 |
While trapped in her own body, Toko sees a memory of Iltutmish, the girl who possessed her. Meanwhile, Seigi struggles fighting Iltutmish, as he does not want to hurt Toko. After some maneuvering, Tom stabilizes himself enough to rip Iltutmish out of Toko's body. Seigi then ends up destroying most of the house with his attack as Iltutmish escapes. The next day, Izzy and Seigi train underneath the house, while Tom tries to cover up the tattoo imprint on Toko's forehead, revealing that his own is merely a removable copy that cancels out other tattoos. Later, Izzy meets with a colleague from the local US Army detachment, while the Brahmin plan their own moves against that same colleague.
| 4 | "Distance"; Transliteration: "Kyori" (Japanese: 距離) | Masahiro Fujii | July 25, 2016 |
Iltutmish drops from a helicopter and slaughters multiple U.S. Army soldiers before fighting Lisa in her safehouse. Izzy attempts to help her but is trapped by a hidden tattoo-cancelling device planted by the Brahmin. Seigi heads on alone and confronts Iltutmish, but is too late to stop her from capturing Lisa. Later, Izzy recovers at the safehouse and tracks down the Brahmin to a nearby port. Tom holds Seigi and Toko in the safehouse basement for their protection, but Seigi decides to break out on his own and help Izzy, accidentally destroying most of the safehouse with his power. That night, Izzy waits by the docks with a small detachment of American soldiers to confront the Brahmin before they leave.
| 5 | "Rescue"; Transliteration: "Dakkan" (Japanese: 奪還) | Masahiro Fujii | August 1, 2016 |
Iltutmish and R.R. cut down several U.S. soldiers with their powers before attacking Izzy. Seigi and Toko arrive in time to help, but Iltutmish attacks them instead, using her "Schroedinger's Cat" power to instantly teleport where anyone can observe. Seigi ends up using his power, but directs it underneath Iltutmish and Toko to create a sinkhole instead of killing them both. Meanwhile, Izzy and a newly-freed Lisa work to take down R.R. However, Aryabahta appears and teleports her Brahmin away from the area. Some time later, Toko spots Aryabahta on the street and challenges her to a ping-pong match. After losing, Aryabahta molests her while telling Seigi more about the tattoos. Later, Aryabahta talks to a mysterious man who attacks Seigi that night.
| 6 | "Reunion"; Transliteration: "Saikai" (Japanese: 再会) | Masahiro Fujii | August 8, 2016 |
Blood (BB) arrives in Japan and takes Seigi to the Aryabahta High Order Physics Lab. This is the Kingdom's base for tattoo research in Japan where they are studying the noise-cancelling system to neutralise tattoos. They break in and encounter the mad Mr. Genius (Dr. Karam) and his fighters who have copy tattoos and are also booby trapped to explode if they are rendered unconscious. BB manages to defuse the bombs, defeat the fighters and neutralise Dr. Karam and his assistant Manisha using his skills and experience as well as his powers. Aryabhata leaves Iltutmish and Cal Shekar to defend the lab and departs. BB and Wiseman agree that Aryabahta must be stopped now because if she gains control it will be impossible to stop her later. He starts training Seigi. Later, he explains to Izzy that the four ruins are the keys to controlling the tattoos, and The Kingdom already has two. Wiseman gives BB an experimental nanomachine capsule to swallow then BB enters a sealed chamber to access and modify the source code of his tattoo.
| 7 | "Storm"; Transliteration: "Arashi" (Japanese: 嵐) | Masahiro Fujii; Shinya Hasegawa | August 15, 2016 |
Colonel Sanders leads a mission against the Kingdom base at the 4th ruin in Japan. He takes Izzy, Seigi, Tōko, the sealed fighters Second Lieutenant Wang, Captain Johnson, Lisa and Major Leonardo Burns, plus 20 sealed copies in a group of helicopters. They first completely blast the site from the helicopters, but Cal Shekar emerges unscathed and easily kills Captain Johnson. Aryabhata sends Iltutmish back to the site to back up Cal. Both sides take heavy casualties. Iltutmish arrives and transforms into a giant saber-toothed tiger-like creature and Izzy realises that they are outclassed. Aryabhata decides to travel to the site herself to provide support for her forces. Colonel Sanders joins the fight and is a match for Cal, but then she disables both Sanders and Izzy. Suddenly BB arrives and confronts Cal. Meanwhile Aryabhata has found Seigi and proceeds to stab him with wooden spears, explaining that her plan was a trap to draw BB into her net so that she could obtain his key. BB teases Cal about loving him, embarrassing her, and then goads her into attacking him.
| 8 | "Creator"; Transliteration: "Sōzō-sha" (Japanese: (創造者) | Masahiro Fujii; Shinya Hasegawa | August 22, 2016 |
BB and Cal engage in a deadly battle, while the remainder of the two forces fight it out. With Sanders badly wounded, Major Leonardo Burns takes control and orders a retreat, but individual battles continue: Burns and Lisa against the Iltutmish giant cat; BB against Cal. Major Leonardo Burns sacrifices himself to save Lisa, and Blood struggles against Cal. In a supreme effort, Seigi manages to use his power to assist BB to defeat Cal, but at the cost to himself. Instead of leaving with Burns, Tōko runs back to be with Seigi, but is killed by Iltutmish's beast. With the battle at a stalemate, Aryabhata decides to withdraw. Back in Tokyo Seigi contemplates what has happened, and Wiseman explains the workings of the tattoos. Izzy finds them and Wiseman tells them BB's master plan, the destruction of all tattoos on Earth. He reveals that fragment of BB's soul remains in Seigi, and that if Seigi enters the chamber he created, he can share BB's memories. Wiseman suggests Seigi join forces with him to realize BB's dream.
| 9 | "The Past"; Transliteration: "Kako" (Japanese: 過去) | Masahiro Fujii; Shinya Hasegawa | August 29, 2016 |
A flashback shows the time when BB joined Arya (Princess Aryabhata) Brahman group to infiltrate her research lab at Samsara in order to find out how to destroy the Tattoos. While in Brahman, BB joins forces with Varma, a young man who is spying on Arya on behalf of the King of Selinistan, to get information on Arya's tattoo research. They learn that Arya was originally created by the King and they see her system for making sister-clones. Varma almost loses his life in their effort to escape and deliver the information to the King.
| 10 | "Letter of Challenge"; Transliteration: "Chōsen-jō" (Japanese: 挑戦状) | Masahiro Fujii; Shinya Hasegawa | September 5, 2016 |
Following the battle at the Kingdom base in Japan, Aya wants BB found dead or alive. Events move forward one year during which Seigi and Izzy spend their time hiding and training with Wiseman's group. Then they receive a video letter from Arya inviting Seigi to the site of the third ruins in the Grand Canyon and which also shows that they have Lisa prisoner. Wiseman wants Seigi to wait until he can plant a virus in his tattoo which is the key to destroying the ruins system, but Izzy wants to rescue Lisa immediately. Seigi, Tom & Tamaki agree to go with her, but before they leave Tamaki proposes to Yumi. The four of them arrive at the Grand Canyon and confront the Kingdom's sealed fighters including R.R. Lurker and the Awful Shark, Dean Carter. Izzy is confronted by both R.R. Lurker and Lisa, who has been possessed by Iltutmish. The U.S. perimeter forces are completely outclassed by the Kingdom's fighters and are all but destroyed. Arya easily infiltrates their command headquarters and attacks and defeats Colonel Sanders.
| 11 | "In the Palm of the Hand"; Transliteration: "Shōjō" (Japanese: 掌上) | Masahiro Fujii; Shinya Hasegawa | September 12, 2016 |
Seigi and his team find the ruins are 200m below in a cavern. Seigi uses his void power to travel down but is confronted by Cal. They have limited access to their powers and must fight using their own abilities. Meanwhile Wiseman's group still battle the Kingdom's sealed fighters above ground. Lawrence and Tony join Izzy to help tackle RR Lurker while she goes head to head against Lisa. Izzy defeats Lisa, but Lurker kills Lawrence although Izzy then shoots Lurker with a sealed poisoned bullet. Seigi manages to defeat Cal with help from the part of BB within him but he is then confronted by Princess Aryabhata. He seems powerless against her, as she manipulates the rocks around them to form a giant hand to crush him. Meanwhile Izzy, Tamaki and Tom pass a forlorn Colonel Sanders on their way to help Seigi. They find him impaled on spikes of rock.
| 12 | "The Deciding Battle"; Transliteration: "Kessen" (Japanese: 決戦) | Chikara Sakurai | September 19, 2016 |
Seigi tries to fight back against Arya but she is just too powerful, and Seigi's own void-maker power is fading. Tom takes the weakened Seigi to safety while Izzy and Tamaki continue the fight against Arya, but they are outclassed as she transforms into a giant black beast. Meanwhile troops evacuate Colonel Sanders to a waiting helicopter. He decides to explode a nuclear bomb which would destroy Arya, the ruins and everyone, but his trigger mechanism fails to detonate. Seigi leaps from the helicopter and catches the wounded Izzy in mid-air. Wiseman initiates a program that transforms Seigi into a giant beast activated by the triggerless tattoo's source, similar to the one created by Arya. The beasts engage in a titanic battle. Seigi realises that Arya's power comes from the souls of her clone sisters which makes him fight even harder. With his martial arts experience and BB's spirit with in him, Seigi destroys Arya's beast but she manages to escape with her life. The US forces rejoice at the victory in the battle, but with Arya still alive the war is not yet over.
