= Lycée François-Arago (Perpignan) =

- Lycée François-Arago (Perpignan)
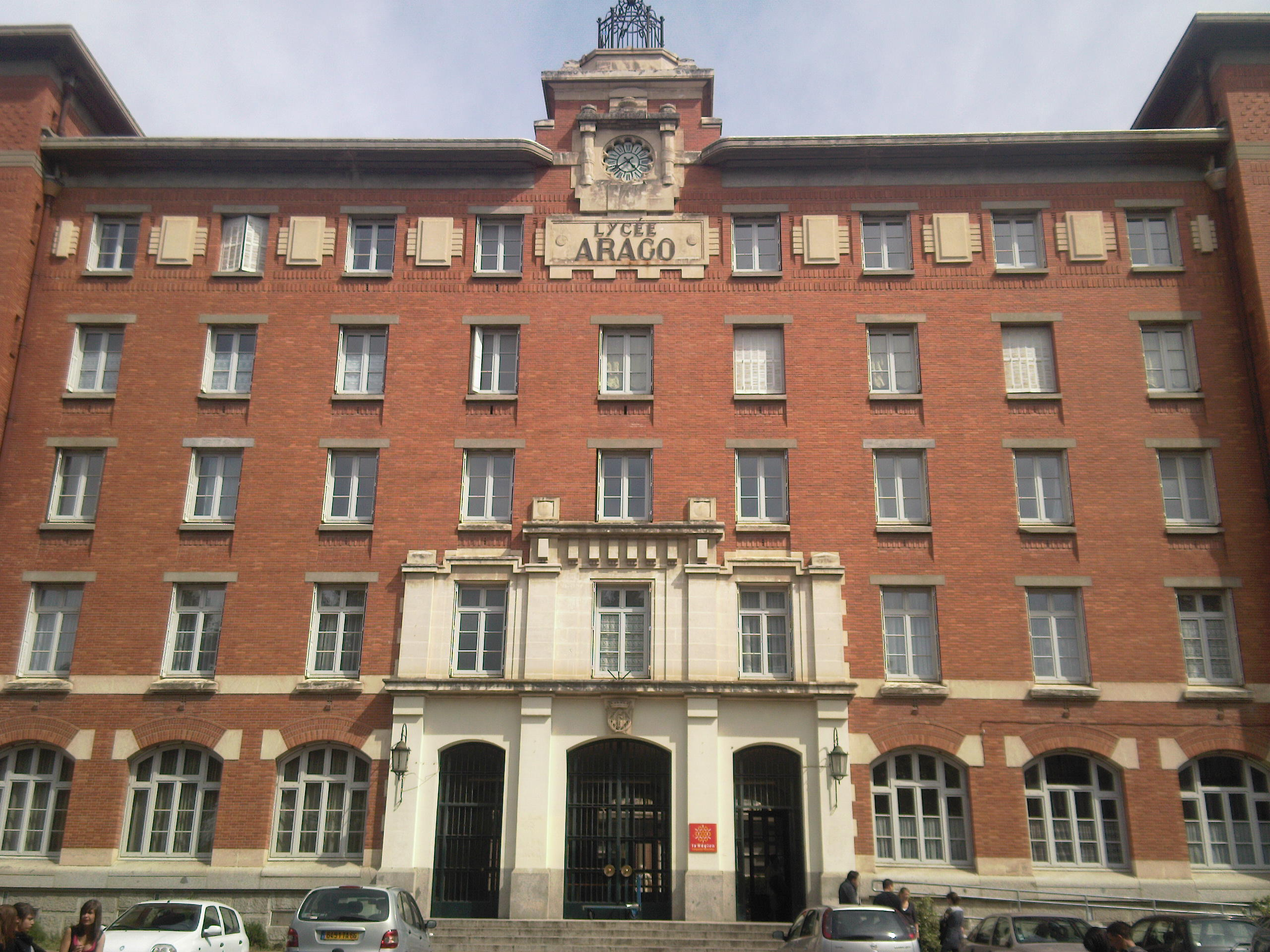
- Central façade of Lycée François-Arago

Location
- 22, Rue du Président Paul Doumer; Perpignan, 66000; France; 42.6952°N 2.8861°E

Information
- Former names: Collège royal de Perpignan; Collège communal de Perpignan; Collège de garçons de Perpignan
- School type: Lycée (public) / Établissement public local d'enseignement (EPLE)
- Established: 1667 (Collège royal); 1808 (Collège de garçons de Perpignan)
- Authority: Académie de Montpellier
- Principal: Inma Umbria
- Grades: Upper secondary to post-secondary (up to Bac+2)
- Language: French(instruction); foreign languages taught: English, German, Arabic, Catalan, Spanish, Latin, Greek, Portuguese, Russian
- Colours: Yellow and mauve
- Website: francois-arago.mon-ent-occitanie.fr

The Lycée François-Arago, also known as the Arago High School of Perpignan, is a French institution providing secondary education and post-secondary education. It is located in the city centre on the banks of the Basse river. It is the successor to the Collège de garçons de Perpignan. The school celebrated its bicentenary in October 2008.

== History ==
=== Collège royal de Perpignan (1667–1808) ===
The Collège royal de Perpignan was founded in 1667. It was the first Jesuit educational institution in the city. At the time, its buildings stood on what is now the Place de la République. The college was nicknamed "Pi" (after the canon Onofre Pi). The building was destroyed by a fire in 1789. However, Abbé Jaubert, a clergyman and philosophy professor at the university, persuaded the authorities to revive it as the collège communal, placed under the direction of a religious authority. This revival was made official by a decree of Napoleon I in June 1807.

=== Collège communal de Perpignan / Collège de garçons de Perpignan (1808–1935) ===
The institution opened on 7 September 1808, on Rue de la Porte d'Assaut, on the site of the present-day "Dalle Arago". As early as 1927, as the buildings became unsanitary, the construction of a new establishment was considered.

The collège communal consisted of two buildings: one for classrooms, and one for dormitories (later workshops). Pupils entered via Rue Zamenhof. The former dormitory building still exists: it temporarily housed an annex of the School of Fine Arts and currently hosts the Centre for Contemporary Art. The classroom buildings were demolished in 1970 to make way for the esplanade known as the "Dalle Arago".

=== Lycée François-Arago (since 1936) ===
In 1936, the city began constructing new, larger, better-adapted buildings on the right bank of the Basse to accommodate the former collège's pupils and to create a lycée. The project was designed by architect Alfred-Joffre. The Second World War interrupted construction, so the new building—still unfinished—began receiving pupils from 1950, while works were only completed in 1955. From 1945, the institution was named after one of its former pupils, François Arago. The new lycée was inaugurated in 1953.

In 1963, due to high enrolment, technical streams were transferred to the new Clos-Banet lycée.

Enrolment rose to 2,500 pupils in 1968, including 450 boarders in 10 dormitories. At that time, classes were split only above a threshold of 50 pupils per class.

In 1976, lower-secondary pupils were transferred to Collège Marcel Pagnol.

The lycée underwent a complete renovation between 2000 (construction of classrooms at the back of courtyards A and C) and 2018, notably including expansion of the library/documentation centre (CDI), the staff room, and an extension of the gymnasium.

The school offers post-baccalaureate programmes (BTS since 1984 and scientific preparatory classes for the grandes écoles since 1989). Its capacity is around 2,000 pupils, and nearly 200 teachers work there.

== Notable alumni and staff ==
=== Scientists ===
- François Arago – physicist and politician, after whom the lycée is named
- Charles Depéret – palaeontologist, credited as the first to discover a dinosaur in France
- André Marchand – mycologist and French teacher at Lycée Arago
- Philippe Arbos – geographer

=== Businesspeople and economists ===
- Jacques Séguéla – French advertising executive, co-founder of the advertising agency RSCG (1970)
- Alfred Sauvy – economist, demographer and sociologist; known for the expression "Third World" and for his work on demographic ageing

=== Artists ===
- Joan Pau Giné – Catalan singer
- Aristide Maillol – French sculptor and painter of Catalan origin
- Marcel Delaris – painter and drawing teacher at Lycée Arago from the Second World War to the early 1970s
- Marcel Durliat – art historian and teacher at Lycée Arago from 1945 to 1958
- Charles Trenet – singer-songwriter and performer

=== Politicians and military figures ===
- Jean-Paul Alduy – former mayor of Perpignan and senator for Pyrénées-Orientales
- François Arago – physicist and politician, after whom the lycée is named
- Jacques Arago – novelist, playwright and explorer
- Étienne Arago – playwright and politician
- Camille Cabana – former French minister
- Pierre-Guillaume-Paul Coronnat – military officer
- Joseph Napoléon Sébastien Sarda Garriga – governor of Réunion
- Joseph Joffre – Marshal of France, commander associated with the Allied victory at the Battle of the Marne
- Guy Malé – former senator for Pyrénées-Orientales
- Félix Mercader – mayor of Perpignan (1944–1949), associated with moving the campus to the banks of the Basse
- Jacques Cresta – deputy and former regional vice-president
- Christophe Euzet – deputy and academic (UPVD)

=== Writers and scholars ===
- Arthur Conte – historian
- Jean-Noël Pancrazi – novelist; Prix Médicis for Les Quartiers d'hiver; member of the Prix Renaudot jury
- Caroline Roque – author of children's novels and comics
- Claude Simon – Nobel Prize in Literature laureate; Prix Médicis (history)

=== Sportspeople ===
- Puig-Aubert – pupil between 1941 and 1943; rugby league world champion
- Jean Galia – rugby player (league and union)
- Christian d'Oriola – Olympic fencing champion
- Jo Maso – rugby union player
- Doriane Vidal – snowboarding world champion and Olympic silver medallist
- Bertrand Guiry – rugby union player
- Robert Raynal – rugby union player
- Lionel Torres – archery world champion (1996)

== Arago alumni association ==
The association of former pupils of Arago (AAA) was founded at the beginning of the 20th century.

== Bibliography ==
- Torreilles, Philippe (1893). Le collège de Perpignan depuis les origines jusqu'à nos jours : avec un plan dressé pendant la révolution (in French). Perpignan: Charles Latrobe. p. 94.
- Rosenstein, Jean-Marie (2008). Du vieux bahut au nouveau lycée : Histoire du lycée Arago Perpinyà 1808–2008. Biblioteca de Catalunya Nord – VIII Terra Nostra (in French). I.C.R.E.C.S (Institut Català de Recerques en Ciènces Socials), Universitat de Perpinyà. p. 304.
- Argent, J. D. (2013). Un amour de collège (in French). Saint-Estève: Imprimerie Saint-André. p. 67.
- "La saga du Bahut Arago". Terres Catalanes (in French): 47–67. 1 March 2004.
