= List of Taboo Tattoo volumes =

The chapters of the Japanese manga Taboo Tattoo are written and illustrated by Shinjirō. It has been published by Media Factory in its Monthly Comic Alive magazine since November 2009. The plot of the Tattoo Taboo manga series is about a martial arts trained middle schooler named Justice Akatsuka who grains a strange tattoo engraved on his hand after saving a mysterious man. The tattoo is a secret weapon produced in the arms race between America and the Selinistan Kingdom.

== Chapters ==
No.	Original release date	Original ISBN	English release date	English ISBN
1	February 23, 2010	978-4-84-012989-3	January 19, 2016	978-0-316268-90-5
Chapters 1-3
By all accounts, middle schooler Seigi is pretty unremarkable except for his martial arts prowess and a desire to protect the weak. But when his good intentions are put to the test by saving an old homeless man from some street thugs, the mysterious man shows his gratitude by...burning a tattoo onto Seigi's palm?! It turns out, the tattoo is a powerful secret weapon that everyone--including a formidable girl with a tattoo of her own--is after. With his life on the line and his martial arts skills alone no match against super-powered foes, will Seigi be able to unlock the latent potential of his tattoo and live to fight another day?!
2	August 23, 2010	978-4-84-013365-4	April 26, 2016	978-0-316310-47-5
Chapters 4-8
Enlisted by the American military officer Izzy, Seigi trains diligently in an effort to master his Spell Crest. But when a friend and colleague of Izzy's is targeted in a war brewing over these superweapons, do Seigi and his partner even have a prayer of surviving their next encounter with the agents of Selinistan?
3	February 23, 2011	978-4-04-066536-8	July 26, 2016	978-0-31-631051-2
Chapters 9-14
Determined to carve his own path, Seigi sets out to face the assassin from Selinistan head-on! But will his training with the Void Maker be enough for him to emerge victorious? And what is the "truth" of the Void Maker Spell Crest itself...?!
4	September 22, 2011	978-4-04-066537-5	October 25, 2016	978-0-31-631055-0
Chapters 15-19
Seigi's Spell Crest is unique in how it creates voids that can cause severe damage to the surrounding area...At least, that's what everyone thought. But now it seems like Princess Aryabhata of the kingdom of Selinistan, as well as the mysterious man called BB, also possess "Infinite Spell Crests" just like Seigi...?!
5	May 23, 2012	978-4-04-066538-2	January 24, 2017	978-0-31-631058-1
Chapters 20-26
6	February 23, 2013	978-4-04-066539-9	April 18, 2017	978-0-31-631061-1
Chapters 27-33
7	October 23, 2013	978-4-84-015334-8	July 18, 2017	978-0-31-631065-9
8	June 23, 2014	978-4-04-066586-3	October 31, 2017	978-0-31-631069-7
9	January 23, 2015	978-4-04-067242-7	February 6, 2018	978-0-31-631072-7
10	June 23, 2015	978-4-04-067537-4	April 24, 2018	978-1-97-530048-7
11	March 23, 2016	978-4-04-068204-4	July 24, 2018	978-1-97-530051-7
12	September 23, 2016	978-4-04-068544-1	October 30, 2018	978-1-97-530054-8
13	August 23, 2017	978-4-04-069197-8	March 19, 2019	978-1-97-530374-7
