= Rick Parker (artist) =

American cartoonist

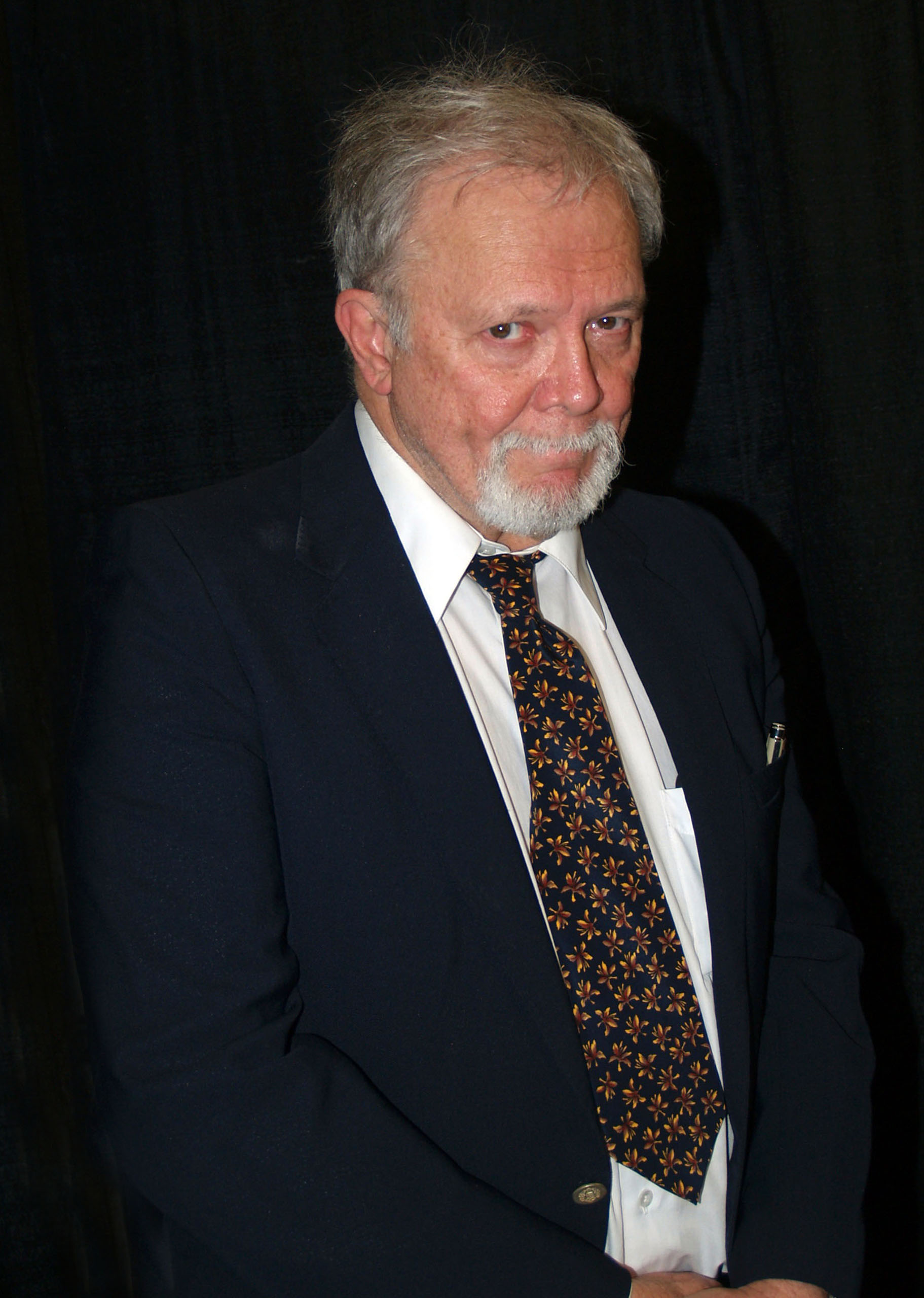
- Parker at a comics convention in April 2016
- Born: Richard Lowell Parker; August 31, 1946 (age 80) Miami, Florida, U.S.
- Areas: Artist, Letterer
- Pseudonyms: Hatch, Ricko, Ricko the Sicko, Skully
- Notable works: Beavis and Butt-Head comic book Deadboy; Papercutz Slices

Lieutenant Rick Parker
- Born: Richard Lowell Parker
- Spouse: Lisa Trusiani
- Children: Grant Parker Grayson Parker
- Military career
- Allegiance: United States of America
- Branch: United States Army
- Service years: 1966–1969
- Rank: 1st Lieutenant
- Unit: Fourth United States Army

Richard Lowell Parker (born 1946) is an American artist, writer, and cartoonist whose humorous artwork has appeared in The New York Times, The Village Voice, Time magazine, U.S. News & World Report, Life magazine, and various comic books published by Marvel Comics.

Parker is widely known as the artist of MTV's Beavis and Butt-Head comic book, published by Marvel from 1994 to 1996. He wrote and illustrated his own graphic novel, Deadboy, in 2010.

== Early life ==
Parker grew up in Savannah, Georgia. He did not own many comic books as a child — instead, his artistic influences include Little Golden Books and the comic strips Mutt and Jeff and Little Orphan Annie. He also lists Will Elder, Wally Wood, Carl Barks, Harvey Kurtzman, Roy Crane, and Jack Davis as influences. Parker earned his Bachelor of Fine Arts at the University of Georgia, and his Master of Fine Arts at the Pratt Institute.

== Military service ==
In February 1966 Parker was drafted into the United States Army, completing basic training at Fort Stewart, GA and becoming a tank driver. Parker applied for Officer Candidate School and completed Advanced Infantry Training at Fort Jackson, SC, subsequently completing Officer Candidate School at Fort Sill. After becoming an officer, Parker was involved in the testing of Pershing Missiles in the deserts of New Mexico and Utah. He was also an acting Battery Commander at Fort Sill and briefly was the Officer-in-Charge of military funerals for Northern Texas, Oklahoma and Western Arkansas.

== Career ==
=== Comics ===
Parker got his start in the comics industry as a letterer for Marvel Comics, starting in the late 1970s. Spider-Man editor Jim Salicrup recalled, "Not only did I like having him letter all the titles just so I can pretend to be J. Jonah Jameson and scream 'Parker!' at him all the time, but he lived not far from me at the time, and quite often I would visit his home and hang out with him while he lettered pages, and then we'd drop 'em off at the FedEx office together. This easily saved days on the schedule, and got the books done much faster." Parker was one of the four original artists of The Pekar Project (SMITH Magazine, 2009–2010), which brought the writing of the American autobiographical comics pioneer Harvey Pekar to the web.

He also drew the introductory pages of Tales from the Crypt for Papercutz from 2007 to 2009. Parker has illustrated a series of graphic novel parodies (written by Stefan Petrucha) for Papercutz Slices (Papercutz) — titles include Diary of a Stinky Dead Kid (2009), Harry Potty and The Deathly Boring (2010), Breaking Down (2011) (a parody of the Twilight series), Percy Jerkson and The Ovolactovegetarians (2011), and The Hunger Pains (2012).

=== Fine art ===
Parker's fine art consists of paintings, drawings, collage, assemblages, sculpture, lithographs, photographs, performance, and conceptual art. He was the founder of the Barking Dog Museum in New York City (1975–1987). His artwork has been shown at the Hundred Acres Gallery in New York, the NYU Art Gallery, The Georgia Museum of Art, the Pratt Institute Art Gallery, Franklin Furnace Book Archives, the Museum of Comic and Cartoon Art, and the DUMBO Arts Center.

Parker's comic art and fine art is in private collections and several institutions.

== Awards ==
- C.A.P.S. Grant, 1978
- Village Voice Photo Contest, 1985
- Comics Buyer's Guide Award, Favorite Letterer, 1989/90
- Inkpot Award, 2024.

== Bibliography ==
- As Illustrator: Everything I Really Need To Know I Learned from Television (Applause Theatre Books, 1992) — written by Barry Dutter
- As author: Deadboy (self-published, 2011)
