= Immortal Rain =

Japanese manga series

- First tankōbon volume cover, featuring Machika Balfaltin (left) and Rain Jewlitt (right)

メテオ・メトセラ (Meteo Metosera)
- Genre: Action; Fantasy; Romance
- Manga
- Written by: Kaori Ozaki
- Published by: Shinshokan
- English publisher: AUS: Madman Entertainment; NA: Tokyopop
- Magazine: Wings
- Original run: 1998 – 2011
- Volumes: 11
- icon

Immortal Rain, known in Japan as Meteor Methuselah (Japanese: メテオ・メトセラ, Hepburn: Meteo Metosera), is a Japanese manga series written and illustrated by Kaori Ozaki. It was originally serialized in Shinshokan's shōjo manga magazine Wings, and published in eleven volumes. It was licensed for English release in North America by Tokyopop, and for French release by Bamboo Édition under their "Doki-Doki" imprint.

== Plot ==
A young assassin named Machika swears to kill the one bounty her grandfather could not get: the immortal Methuselah. But when she goes after him, she finds a clumsy, kind man named Rain who has lost more than he can bear in his unnatural lifetime. Unwilling to admit at first that she likes him, Machika willingly follows him as he waits for the one who made him immortal, still swearing to take his life one day. Their love for each other grows as they battle bounty hunters, a mysterious organization, and monstrous "angels" to save Rain and perhaps even humanity.

== Characters ==
=== Main characters ===
Machika Balfaltin (マチカ・バルファルティン, Machika Barufarutin)
At the beginning of the series, Machika is a fourteen-year-old assassin. Her grandfather, and presumably her only guardian, died a month before the series starts. Machika is a tomboy who shows little interest in men until she meets and falls in love with Rain. She is very determined and headstrong and never gives up hope. She later witnesses the horrible "death" of Rain and meets him a year later. Her grandfather was Zol the Assassin, so she first wanted to hunt down Rain, the only bounty her grandfather could never catch.
Rain Jewlitt (レイン・ジウリット, Rein Jiuritto)
More commonly known as Methuselah, Rain is 624 years old. His immortality makes him famous and is the subject of numerous bounties. The cause of Rain's immortality is a mysterious man who appears in flashbacks early in the series. Rain is described as a "nice screw-up" and is one of the funniest characters. He falls in love with Machika as the story moves along. Tending to stay away from violence, he doesn't try to stay close to others because he fears their deaths. Rain in the flashbacks was shot and killed by Yuca and then 'reborn' by him after Yuca fed him Freya's (an infected subject) flesh and blood. Rain is the opposite of Yuca in many ways, and has told him he will never view life the way Yuca does. Rain has all the powers of an angel, but none of the drawbacks, and is considered a 'perfect immortal'. He has a relaxed, slightly offbeat personality.
Sharem Cordelan (シャレム・コーディラン, Sharemu Kōdiran)
In the earlier volumes, this beautiful woman is the villain. She is the subtly spirited, quick-witted Vice President of a company called Calvaria, which is trying to find the secret to immortality, eternal youth, and weapons of mass destruction. It is later revealed that Sharem is also the President's wife, and her son was a victim of a tragic accident. She never got over the death of her son, especially considering that after him, she was no longer able to bear children. She adopts orphans with no place to go, provides for them and sees to their education; they very much loved her. She says at one point that she intended to marry for money, not for love, about her husband, and often taunts him, seeing him as the cause of Ys' death. After her sister gives birth to Ishmael's second son, she adopts him as her own and names him "Ys" in memory of her old son. She doesn't know that her second son is also a reincarnation of Yuca. Machievelian and prepared to do anything to achieve what she considers her end. She is the tragic charmer of the series.
Yuca Collabel (ユカ・コラベル, Yuka Koraberu)
This man is seen in Rain's flashbacks. His place and purpose are explained throughout the series. His main goal is to end human life, as each time he dies, he is reincarnated as another human being. Yuca is the reincarnation of the spirit of Methuselah, the name later applied to Rain. He wants to die eternally, but the only way to guarantee his final death seems to be having no population left to birth him. After killing himself in front of Rain, he reincarnates years later as Ishmael's son (his mother, who is Sharem's sister, immediately dies after giving birth to a child that is already in the form of a young boy). Sharem calls him "Ys" as she believes he is her son Ys' reincarnation. He had experience creating "angels" in his previous "life," so during his life as Ys, he creates numerous "angels" as devices for mass destruction. He was the person responsible for Freya's death and the production of the biological weapons, and for Rain's immortality. He wants Rain to experience his pain and see his depression from being the person that he is. In a later volume, it is hinted that a part of Yuca secretly wants Rain to stop him.
Freya Gaudry (フレイア・ゴードリー, Fureia Gōdorī)
A girl also seen in Rain's flashbacks. She was Rain's love interest until Yuca shot her. She played the violin, which Rain carries despite his inability to play. Since she was one of the infected "specimens" of Yuca's experimentations who had not yet transformed, her blood was used to immortalize Rain. Unfortunately for Rain, Freya loved Yuca more. Rain is constantly reminded of her when he's with Machika.
Kiki (キキ)
A cat-like "angel" created 600 years before, at the time of Rain's making. He was rescued by the Doctor and given to Machika. In volume 5, Kiki begins to talk and has developed a taste for cat meat.
Zol Balfaltin (ゾル・バルファルティン, Zoru Barufarutin; also known as Zol the Grim Reaper)
Machika's grandfather and the famous bounty hunter who was later assassinated. The only bounty that he could never catch was the immortal Methuselah. His trademark weapon was his scythe, which Machika now carries, and he was the closest person to Machika before she met Rain. A miniseries prequel about the encounter between Rain and Zol, AKA Shinigami of the East, is in the Japanese Magazine "Huckleberry."

== Publication ==
Written and illustrated by Kaori Ozaki, Meteor Methuselah was serialized in Shinshokan's shōjo manga magazine Wings. Its chapters were compiled in eleven tankōbon volumes, published from 24 August 1999, to 26 May 2011.

In December 2003, Tokyopop announced that it had licensed the manga for English release in North America, retitled Immortal Rain, with publication to begin the following June. Eight volumes were published between 8 June 2004, and 4 September 2007, before it was discontinued. It was licensed for French release by Bamboo Édition under their "Doki-Doki" manga imprint.

=== Volumes ===
No.	Original release date	Original ISBN	English release date	English ISBN
1	24 August 1999	978-4-40-361555-9	8 June 2004	978-1-59182-722-1
2	8 August 2000	978-4-40-361597-9	3 August 2004	978-1-59182-723-8
3	23 October 2001	978-4-40-361651-8	5 October 2004	978-1-59182-724-5
4	24 June 2002	978-4-40-361678-5	11 January 2005	978-1-59182-990-4
5	9 September 2003	978-4-40-361724-9	12 April 2005	978-1-59182-991-1
6	24 May 2004	978-4-40-361753-9	12 July 2005	978-1-59532-799-4
7	21 December 2005	978-4-40-361815-4	7 November 2006	978-1-59816-798-6
8	24 October 2006	978-4-40-361847-5	4 September 2007	978-1-42780-456-3
9	24 September 2008	978-4-40-361916-8	—	—
10	23 October 2009	978-4-40-361947-2	—	—
11	26 May 2011	978-4-40-362109-3	—	—

== Reception ==
Reviewing the Tokyopop version in Manga: The Complete Guide, writer Jason Thompson rated it three stars out of four, commending the manga for combining the "complex character-driven plot of a shōjo manga with the action scenes and art of a shōnen manga". In a later column on Anime News Network, Thompson praised the manga further, writing "[w]ith so many familiar anime tropes, I wouldn't call it one of the absolute best manga ever, but it's got lots of original touches and bits of great poetry, and it's rare to see a manga for any kind of reader, a manga where everything – story and art and characters – is just so well done." Liann Cooper of Anime News Network was not as impressed with the first volume, noting its "light artwork and underdeveloped characters", but was won over by its story and deeper character development in the second volume.

== See also ==
- The Gods Lie, another manga series by the same author
- The Golden Sheep, another manga series by the same author
