= Flood of 1940 in France =

Flood of 1940
- Date: 16–20 October 1940
- Location: Pyrénées-Orientales; Aude; Catalonia
- Cause: Mediterranean episode (extreme rainfall)

The Flood of 1940 (in French and Catalan "aiguat de 1940") was a Mediterranean episode of extreme rainfall in October 1940 over the uplands of the eastern Pyrenees. It caused devastating floods in the French departments of Pyrénées-Orientales and Aude as well as in Catalonia in Spain.

== Etymology ==
« Quan arriba l'aiguat, hi ha pas res de salvat » (When the aiguat arrives, nothing is saved.)

— Catalan proverb

The Catalan word aiguat (pronounced in english roughly "eye-goo-at") has been adopted into French usage to refer to this type of event.

== Overview ==
The rainy episode in Pyrénées-Orientales lasted from 16 to 20 October 1940. Despite the disruption of meteorological services during the war, 840 mm (33 in) of rain was recorded on 17 October, which is officially considered a European record for 24-hour precipitation; the rain gauge overflowed several times, and a value of 1,000 mm (39 in) is considered consistent with reality. Guillaume Julia, a primary school teacher in Saint-Laurent-de-Cerdans, measured 1,930 mm (76 in) over five days, including 1,000 mm (39 in) on 17 October alone.

The death toll was about 50 in Pyrénées-Orientales (mainly in the Tech valley, around Amélie-les-Bains) and more than 300 in Catalonia. The event led to the evacuation and subsequent closure of the internment camp of Saint-Cyprien. The foreigners interned there at the time (mainly Jews from Central Europe and Nazi Germany) were transferred to Gurs.

== Consequences ==
=== Consequences in the Tech valley ===
==== Effects in Prats-de-Mollo ====
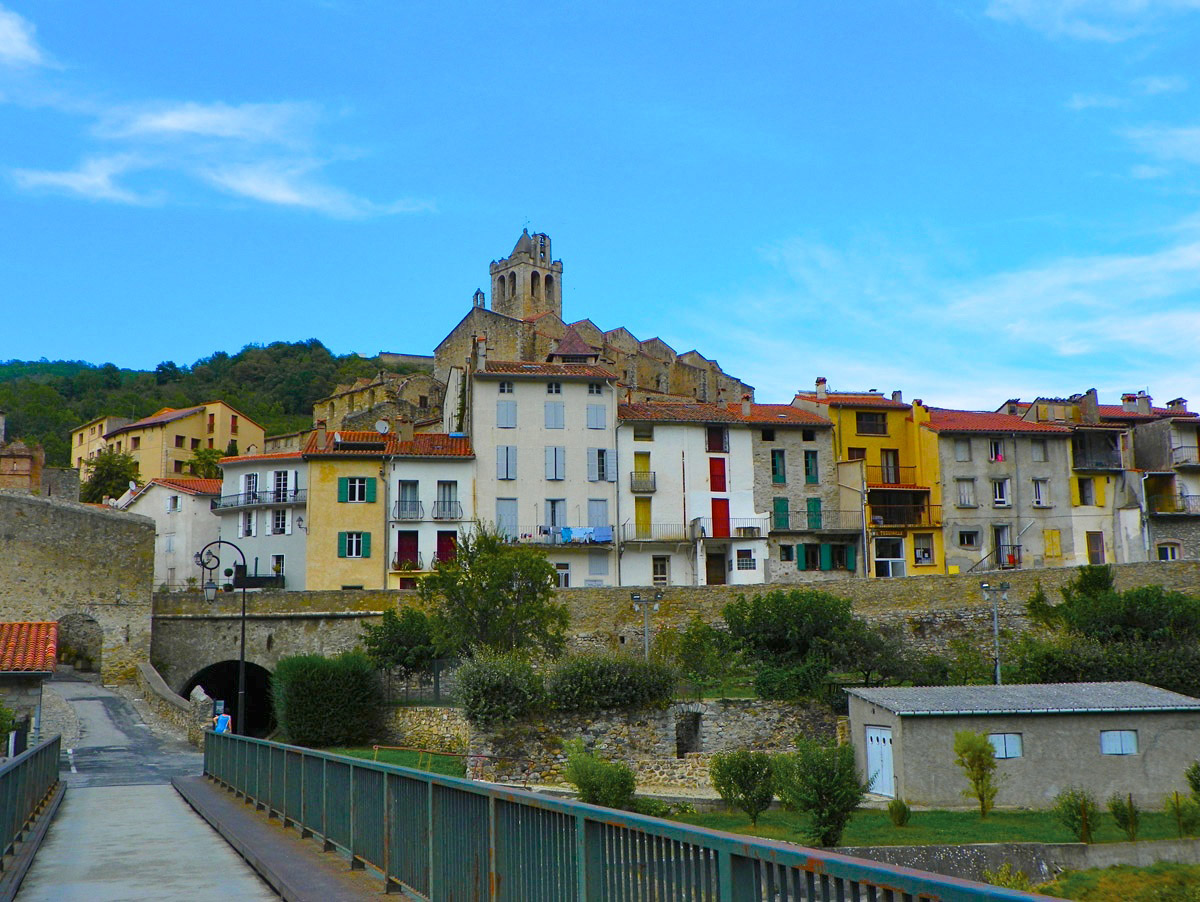
View of Prats-de-Mollo after the Aiguat. The bridge in the foreground is the one rebuilt after the destruction of the original.

Prats-de-Mollo-la-Preste lost several of its fountains. The aiguat devastated part of Prats and its valley, notably sweeping away the Pont d'Espagne and several facilities. The disaster contributed to a reorientation of the local economy towards tourism and thermal spa activity.

==== Effects in Le Tech ====
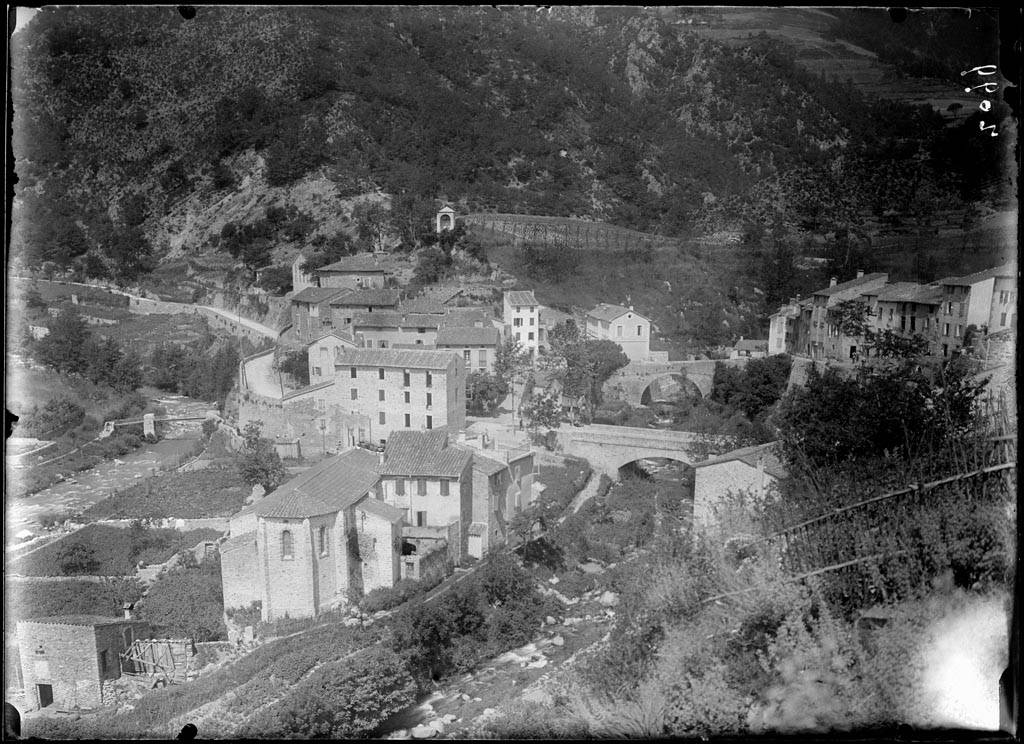
View of Le Tech before the Aiguat. The church and several buildings visible here were later destroyed.

The village of Le Tech was similarly affected. The Notre-Dame-de-l'Assomption church was swept away by the current, leading to its reconstruction on higher ground within the village.

==== Effects in Arles-sur-Tech ====
In Arles-sur-Tech, the first factory of the Cémoi group, was destroyed by the floodwaters, prompting the company to relocate to Perpignan. A peak discharge of 4,600 m^{3}/s (160,000 cu ft/s) was recorded in the commune. Arles-sur-Tech produced a digital document illustrating the event with period photographs.

==== Effects in Amélie-les-Bains ====
Amélie-les-Bains was left in ruins; its railway station (Gare d'Amélie-les-Bains) and casino were swept away as far as Brouilla. Amélie-les-Bains lost 23 residents, nearly half of the French death toll.

==== Other impacts ====
At Boulou, a peak discharge of 3,500 m^{3}/s (120,000 cu ft/s) was recorded. The Saint-Cyprien camp was destroyed, leading to its closure and the evacuation of its prisoners—particularly towards the Gurs camp and Argelès-sur-Mer (less affected by flooding). Two victims were recorded there, two Spanish women. The railway bridge over the Tech between Elne and Palau-del-Vidre was destroyed, as was the former Can Bia bridge.

=== Consequences in the Têt valley ===
==== Effects in Vernet-les-Bains ====
The town of Vernet-les-Bains was also impacted: at least 71 houses and five hotels were destroyed by the flood. By 17 October, 58 buildings had already been annihilated. The town's thermal establishment was inundated; the Hôtel du Parc and several villas were swept away. Only the Casino de Vernet-les-Bains and the Hôtel du Portugal remained as witnesses of the town's former spa era.

==== Other impacts ====
The Basse river flooded with a discharge of 3,600 m^{3}/s (130,000 cu ft/s), as did the Têt, far above its usual discharge of about 11 m^{3}/s (390 cu ft/s). At the Joffre bridge, the water level rose from about 1 m (3.3 ft) to 5.6 m (18 ft).

== See also ==
- Cold drop
