= Arbos (disambiguation) =

Arbos may refer to:

== People ==
- Philippe Arbos (1882–1956), French geographer

== Companies ==
- Arbos - an Italian agricultural machinery company

== See also ==
- Arbós
