= Squalor =

Squalor refers to filthiness and degradation, as from neglect or poverty.

Squalor may also refer to:

- Squalor (comic), a limited series by Stefan Petrucha and Tom Sutton
- Senile squalor syndrome (Diogenes syndrome) characterised by extreme self neglect and hoarding

== Characters in A Series of Unfortunate Events ==
- Esmé Squalor
- Jerome Squalor
