= The Gods Lie =

Japanese manga series

- Tankōbon volume cover, featuring Natsuru Nanao (left) and Rio Suzumura (right)

神様がうそをつく。 (Kamisama ga Uso o Tsuku)
- Genre: Coming-of-age; Romance; Slice of life
- Manga
- Written by: Kaori Ozaki
- Published by: Kodansha
- English publisher: NA: Vertical
- Imprint: Afternoon KC
- Magazine: Monthly Afternoon
- Original run: March 25, 2013 – July 25, 2013
- Volumes: 1
- icon

The Gods Lie (Japanese: 神様がうそをつく。, Hepburn: Kamisama ga Uso o Tsuku; stylized as the gods lie.) is a Japanese manga series written and illustrated by Kaori Ozaki. It was serialized in Kodansha's seinen manga magazine Monthly Afternoon from March to July 2013, with its chapters collected in a single tankōbon volume. It was licensed in English by Vertical. The story follows Natsuru Nanao, a boy from Tokyo with a single mother, who spends the summer season bonding with Rio Suzumura, a girl who lives unsupervised with her younger brother in their rundown home and harbors a dark secret.

== Plot ==
Natsuru Nanao is a sixth-grader who recently moved from Tokyo with his single mother, Ritsuko, to an unfamiliar location. At his new school, he unintentionally rebuffs a popular girl's advances, making him unpopular with the other girls. In Natsuru’s soccer class, Coach Okada is hospitalized with cancer, being replaced by the younger, uncompromising Coach Sakai. One day, Natsuru discovers a lone stray kitten with an injured leg. Attempting to keep the kitten in his apartment, Ritsuko's allergies flare up, and she makes Natsuru leave with the kitten. Outside, Natsuru runs into classmate Rio Suzumura and her younger brother, Yuuta, and asks if they can keep the kitten in their house. He tags along with them going grocery shopping before heading home, where Natsuru notices they live in squalid conditions without any adults.

As summer vacation begins, Natsuru abandons attending soccer classes after kicking a soccer ball in Coach Sakai's face over his constant insults. While sitting alone, Suzumura approaches him and asks him to stay at her house. Natsuru spends the next few weeks staying with Suzumura, Yuuta, and their kitten, now named Tofu. He learns about how their backyard is haunted by a ghost, and that their single father, who is frequently absent, left for a fishing trip in Alaska three months ago. Natsuru agrees not to tell anyone about their living conditions, but suspects something is under the backyard. The three retrieve a lone stag beetle in their backyard one night after mistaking it for a ghost, and keep it as a pet.

While preparing for the town festival which their father was supposed to come back for, Natsuru notices Suzumura inadvertently mentioning their grandfather's room. Although their father still has not arrived, the three attend the festival anyway, when a sudden downpour causes them all to get wet. Natsuru realizes he is in love with Suzumura. The next day, Natsuru finds the pet beetle dead and starts to bury it in the backyard, accidentally uncovering a skeletonized corpse. Horrified at his discovery, Suzumura tells him her secret: on the day their father departed, he left them under the care of their grandfather. The day after, Suzumura found their grandfather dead from a fall on the stairs. Panicking over what the authorities would do to them, Suzumura carried him to the backyard where she buried him. Upset at this revelation, Natsuru runs back home. Ritsuko overhears that he skipped soccer classes all summer, but Natsuru refuses to tell her about Suzumura.

With summer vacation over, Natsuru and Suzumura return to school, where Natsuru angrily attacks one of the popular girls bullying Suzumura for her impoverished appearance. Picking up Natsuru after school, Ritsuko grows concerned and insists on knowing what he is hiding. Natsuru runs off and heads to the hospital, visiting a recovering Coach Okada; Okada promises to play soccer together soon. One night after grocery shopping, Suzumura is left devastated seeing her father walking together with a younger woman, realizing the truth about his absences. As she and Yuuta lie depressed at home, Natsuru returns with all his cash savings, asking that they run away together. The three, with Tofu, take the train to a remote coastal town. Renting a room at the local inn, the three discuss their futures. Suzumura confesses her love for Natsuru and kisses him, just as Ritsuko arrives with the police at the inn. As Suzumura, Yuuta, and Tofu are taken away in a separate police car, Ritsuko finally understands that Natsuru was protecting them the entire time, embracing him as he is left heartbroken.

The next day, Suzumura and Yuuta are placed in foster care as their grandfather's body is found by authorities. Their father is exposed for child neglect and lying about an affair with a local nightclub hostess, and Tofu is adopted through animal rescue. Natsuru repeatedly gets in trouble at school for beating up students spreading rumors about Suzumura, but Ritsuko never punishes him. Natsuru rejoins soccer class with a fully recovered Coach Okada.

Some time passes, and Natsuru is about to enter middle school when Ritsuko alerts him to a phone call from Suzumura. Hearing from Natsuru after so long, Suzumura promises to meet him again soon.

== Characters ==
Natsuru Nanao (七尾 なつる, Nanao Natsuru)
An 11 year-old boy who moved from Tokyo to an unfamiliar location in Japan. He likes playing soccer. He is open with his emotions, being quick to attack someone if they hurt him or the people he cares for. Despite being born in March, his first name, which contains "summer" (夏, Natsu), comes from how he was born very small, and that if he survived until the summer, he would lead a normal life.
Rio Suzumura (鈴村 理生, Suzumura Rio)
A girl in the same class as Natsuru. She is much taller than the rest of her classmates. She tends to keep to herself. She is superstitious, believing in ghosts. Despite her cold exterior, she loves cats, and warms up to Natsuru over the summer. Her first name, in kanji, means "reason to live", which she confides to Natsuru when confessing her love for him.
Yuuta Suzumura (鈴村 勇太, Suzumura Yūta)
Rio Suzumura's younger brother. He is boisterous and excitable, and loves cats despite being allergic to them.
Tofu (とうふ, Tōfu)
A small white cat Natsuru finds in a dumpster under a bridge. She has a lame leg, but remains agile.
Ritsuko Nanao (七尾 律津子, Nanao Ritsuko)
Natsuru's mother, who he affectionately calls Ritsu-chan (律ちゃん). She works as a light novel writer, although she suffers from writer's block often. She is allergic to cats. Her husband died from cancer when Natsuru was young, and his death still affects her to this day.
Coach Okada (岡田コーチ, Okada Kōchi)
Natsuru's coach before Maruo Sakai temporarily replaces him. He is affected with cancer, forcing him to stay at hospital for the summer. He has a laid-back and friendly attitude, but is somewhat incompetent at playing soccer himself.
Maruo Sakai (坂井 丸雄, Sakai Maruo)
A younger, more aggressive coach who temporarily replaces Coach Okada. He has a hostile attitude and throws insults at his students. He is not seen again after Natsuru attacks him with a soccer ball.

== Publication ==
Written and illustrated by Kaori Ozaki, The Gods Lie was serialized in Kodansha's seinen manga magazine Monthly Afternoon from March 25 to July 25, 2013. Kodansha collected its five chapters in a single tankōbon volume, released on September 20, 2013.

In North America, Vertical licensed the series for English release in July 2015. The volume was released in print on April 19, 2016. The digital edition was released later that year, on October 4.

== Reception ==
Kory Cerjak of The Fandom Post graded the manga a "B+", describing it as a "charming story of overcoming the things that stand in our way and come out the other side despite it all, from the perspective of a sixth grader because why not." Rebecca Silverman of Anime News Network found its character designs too similar to Kaori Ozaki's previous work, Immortal Rain, but still praised the author's "delicate touch that allows for a lot of emotion in her work, largely seen in body language and facial expressions, which are deceptively simple." She found its story to be "quietly heart-wrenching", and graded it an "A". Writing for Otaku USA, Jason Thompson recommended the manga for its "excellent story, with accomplished artwork in a style neither shōjo nor shōnen".

== See also ==
- The Golden Sheep, another manga series by the same author
- Immortal Rain, another manga series by the same author
