= Arbós =

Arbós may refer to:

- Enrique Fernández Arbós (1863 –1939), a Spanish violinist
- Eduard Arbós (b. 1983), a Spanish field hockey player
- Juan Arbós (b. 1952), a Spanish field hockey player
- Jaime Arbós (b. 1952), a Spanish field hockey player

== See also ==
- ARBOS – Company for Music and Theatre
- Arbo (disambiguation)
- Arbos (disambiguation)
