= Vamos Lá! =

Japanese manga series

ばもら！ (Bamora!)
- Genre: Sports
- Manga
- Written by: Yoshimi Osada
- Published by: Media Factory
- Imprint: MF Comics
- Magazine: Monthly Comic Flapper
- Original run: November 2008 – December 2010
- Volumes: 3

Vamos Lá! (ばもら！, Bamora!), from Portuguese Let's Go!, is a Japanese manga series written and illustrated by Yoshimi Osada. It has been published in France by Bamboo Édition, under their manga imprint Doki Doki.

== Plot ==
Yu Kamazaki is a schoolgirl who lacks confidence in herself and fears the gaze of others. Rather aggressive, this does not let anyone near her. However, she becomes fascinated by the personality of Asami Kume, a dynamic and popular girl, and joins the futsal club that is played on the roof of the school. She is surprised to love the sport, yet collective and enjoys the company of other players.
