= Bertrand Escaich =

French comics writer (born 1973)

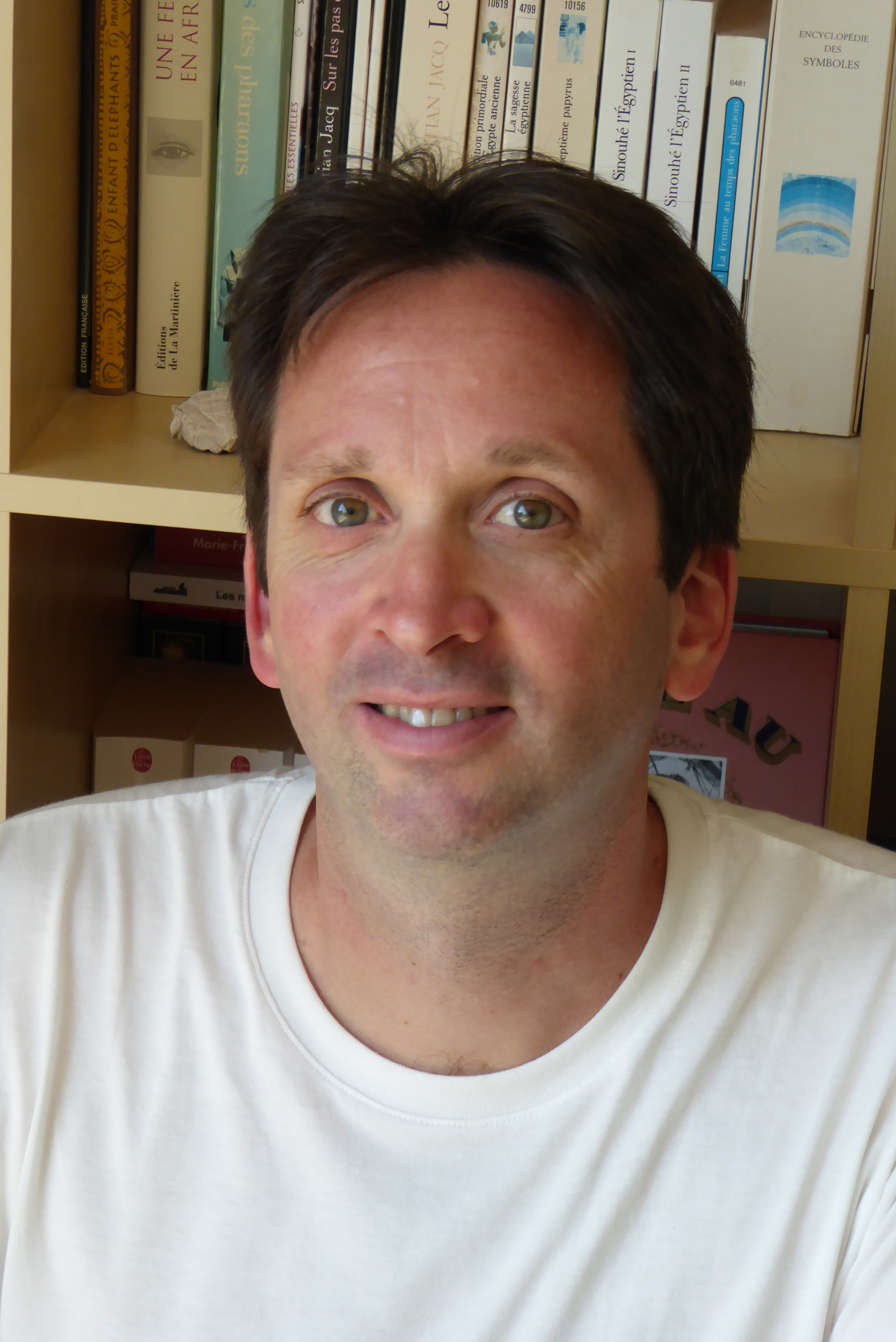
- Born: July 3, 1973 (age 53) Saint-Girons, Ariège, France
- Area: Writer
- Notable works: Les Rugbymen; Studio Danse; Le Jour où...
- Awards: Prix des collégiens (Festival d'Angoulême), 2009

Bertrand Escaich (born 3 July 1973, in Saint-Girons, Ariège) is a French comics writer. Together with Caroline Roque, he forms the duo Béka.

== Biography ==
Bertrand Escaich began making his first comics in primary school and became interested in the following authors: Hergé, Franquin, Goscinny and Peyo for humour, and Jean-Michel Charlier for adventure.

In 1998, while enrolled in a bachelor's degree in physical sciences at Paul Sabatier University in Toulouse, he sent a portfolio to a few publishers. Vents d'Ouest responded favourably, and his first pages were published in collective albums. In 2000, he met Alexandre Mermin (later known as Poupard, artist of Les Rugbymen) at the Le Livre sur la Place book fair, and they began collaborating. Their first album, Les Brumes du Miroboland, enabled them to join Bamboo Édition, founded by Olivier Sulpice.

Escaich met Caroline Roque in 2001, and they formed the duo Béka. At Olivier Sulpice's request, they both took over scripts for several Bamboo series before creating successful series including Les Rugbymen (art by Poupard) and Studio Danse (art by Crip), followed by Le Jour où... (art by Marko).

Escaich won the Prix des collégiens at the Angoulême International Comics Festival in 2009 for the series Chinn (two volumes drawn by Frédéric Vervisch).

At Dargaud, Escaich and Roque created the series Géo BD (art by Marko), then Filles Uniques (art by Camille Méhu). At Dupuis, he co-wrote with Roque the series Champignac and volume 65 of Les Tuniques Bleues. With the same publisher, they created the series Cœur Collège (art by Maya), A-lan (art by Thomas Labourot), and L'École des petits monstres (art by Bob). In 2022, Escaich created the series Les Cœurs de Ferraille on his own, drawn by José Luis Munuera.

== Works ==
=== Under the name Bertrand Escaich ===
==== As writer ====
- Noémie - L'Héritage de la tante Adubon, written by Bertrand Escaich, art by Alexis Chabert, Pointe Noire, 2001 ISBN 2-84553-045-5
- Les Contes de par-ci de par-là, written by Bertrand Escaich, art by Abel Chen, Pointe Noire, 2002 ISBN 2-84553-055-2
- Les Brumes du Miroboland, Bamboo Édition
1. L'Élixir de Silyconn, written by Bertrand Escaich, art by Alexandre Mermin, 2003 ISBN 2-912715-88-1
2. Le Secret de Fènwik, 2004 ISBN 2-915309-13-2
- Chinn, written by Bertrand Escaich, art by Fred Vervisch, Bamboo Édition
1. Les Bambous de la sagesse, 2008 ISBN 978-2-350-78379-6
2. Le Monastère de la vieille forêt, 2008 ISBN 978-2-350-78458-8
- Ling Ling, written by Bertrand Escaich, art by Marc N'Guessan, Bamboo Édition
1. Le Bureau des Rumeurs, 2012 ISBN 978-2-8189-0837-2
2. Les Lanternes roses, 2012 ISBN 978-2-8189-0907-2

==== As artist ====
- Mini-guide, Vents d'Ouest
  - Le Mini-guide du Bélier, collective writing and art, 1999 ISBN 2-86967-788-X
  - Le Mini-guide du Taureau, collective writing and art, 1999 ISBN 2-86967-796-0
  - Le Mini-guide des Gémeaux, collective writing and art, 1999 ISBN 2-86967-791-X
  - Le Mini-guide de la Balance, collective writing and art, 1999 ISBN 2-86967-787-1
  - Le Mini-guide du Sagittaire, collective writing and art, 1999 ISBN 2-86967-794-4
  - Le Mini-guide du Capricorne, collective writing and art, 1999 ISBN 2-86967-790-1
  - Le Mini-guide du Verseau, collective writing and art, 1999 ISBN 2-86967-797-9
  - Le Mini-guide des Poissons, collective writing and art, 1999 ISBN 2-86967-793-6
  - Le Mini-guide des 12 signes astros, collective writing and art, 2002 ISBN 2-7493-0067-3
- Le Guide de la jeune mère, written by Jacky Goupil, art by Bertrand Escaich, Vents d'Ouest, 2000 ISBN 2-86967-862-2

=== Under the name Béka ===
- Les Fourmidables (vol. 2), art by Vincent Deporter, Bamboo, 2001 ISBN 2-915309-05-1
- Les Rugbymen — 20 volumes, Bamboo Édition; art by Poupard
- Studio Danse — 12 volumes, Bamboo Édition; art by Crip
- Dance Class — 12 volumes, Papercutz USA; art by Crip; translated by Joe Johson
- Les Petits Rugbymen — 5 youth novels, Bamboo Poche; art by Poupard
- Le Rugby et ses Règles, written with international referee Joël Jutge, 2018 ISBN 978-2-8189-4414-1
- Studio Danse — 5 youth novels, Bamboo Poche; art by Crip
- Voyage en Chine, art by Marko, Bamboo Édition, 2013 ISBN 978-2-8189-2303-0
- Voyage en Inde, art by Marko, Bamboo Édition, 2014 ISBN 978-2-81892653-6
- Géo BD — 4 volumes, Dargaud; art by Marko
- Planète Gaspard — 2 volumes, Bamboo Édition, 2016; art by Domas
- Les Aventures de Teddy Riner — 3 volumes, Dargaud, 2016; art by Jikko
- Les Fées Valentines — 5 volumes, Dargaud, 2016; art by Crip
- Le jour où... — 5 volumes, Bamboo Édition, 2016; art by Marko
- L'Atelier Détectives — 2 volumes, Bamboo, 2017; art by Sandrine Goalec
- Le Blog de... — 4 volumes, Bamboo Édition, 2017; art by Grégoire Mabire
- Le Chemin des Fous — 1 volume, Bamboo, 2018; art by Poupard
- Mission Capitale — 2 youth novels, Rageot, 2018
- Science Infuse — 1 volume, Bamboo, 2022; written by Béka and Chacma; art by J. Mariolle; colours by Laurence Croix
- Champignac — 3 volumes, Dupuis; art by David Etien
1. Enigma, 2019
2. Le patient A, 2021
3. Quelques atomes de carbone, 2023
- Les Tuniques Bleues (vol. 65), Dupuis, 2020
- Cœurs Collège — 3 volumes, Dupuis; art and colours by Maya
- A-lan — 1 volume, Dupuis; art and colours by Thomas Labourot
- L'École des petits monstres — 1 volume, Dupuis; art by Bob; colours by Maëla Cosson
- Les Cœurs de Ferraille — 1 volume, Dupuis; art by José Luis Munuera; colours by Sedyas
- Filles Uniques — 3 volumes, Dargaud; art by Camille Méhu

== Awards ==
- 2008:
  - Grand Prix des lecteurs du Journal de Mickey
  - Prix Conseil Général (Bd BOUM festival, Blois)
- 2009: Prix des collégiens, Angoulême International Comics Festival
- 2013: Best youth comics award, Puteaux festival (with Crip) for Studio Danse
- 2017: Audience award, Hérouville-Saint-Clair festival (with Marko) for Le Jour où le bus est reparti sans elle
- 2016–2017: Cité scolaire de Fumel award (image of women in comics), with Marko and Cosson, for Le Jour où le bus est reparti sans elle
- 2017: Grand Prix des lecteurs du Journal de Mickey (with Grégoire Mabire) for Le Blog de Nina
- 2018:
  - Youth prize, Du vent dans les BD (with Sandrine Goalec) for L'Atelier Détectives
  - Audience award, BDécines festival, for Le Jour où le bus est reparti sans elle (with Marko and Cosson)
