= Arbo =

Arbo may refer to:

== Places ==
- Arbo, Pontevedra, a municipality in Galicia, Spain
- Arbo, Mardin (Turkish: Taşköy), an Assyrian village in Turkey
- Arbo, Georgia, a village in Georgia

== People ==
=== Given name ===
- Arbo Kalbi (1911–1940), the nom de guerre of Finnish war correspondent Kalevi Heikkinen
- Aribo of Austria (c. 850 – 909), or Arbo, margrave of the March of Pannonia
- Arbeo of Freising (c. 723 – 784), or Arbo, Bishop of Freising

=== Surname ===
- Eline Arbo (born 1986), Norwegian theatre director and playwright
- Manuel Arbó (1898–1973), Spanish film actor
- Miquel Asins Arbó (1918–1996), Spanish composer
- Peter Nicolai Arbo (1831–1892), Norwegian painter
- Peter Nicolaj Arbo (1657–1827), Norwegian-Danish merchant and landowner
- Rani Arbo, American bluegrass musician
- Sebastià Juan Arbó (1902–1984), Catalan novelist and playwright
- Verónica Arbo (born 1968), Argentine sprint canoer
- Bob Arbogast (1927–2009), nicknamed "Arbo", American radio broadcaster, voice actor, and television host.

== Other uses ==
- Arbo Mountain, a mountain in Lincoln County, Montana

== See also ==
- Arbós
