= Stefan Petrucha =

American novelist

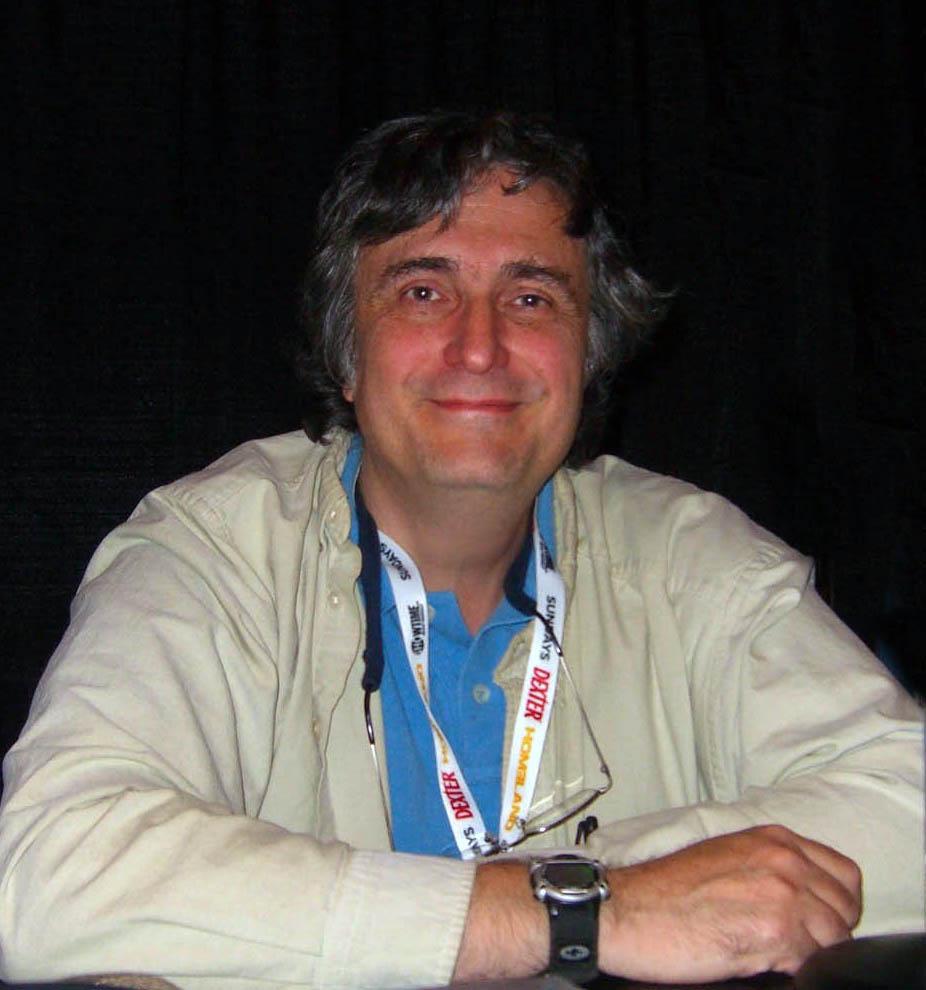
- Petrucha at the 2012 New York Comic Con.
- Born: January 27, 1959 (age 67)
- Occupations: Novelist, comics writer
- Spouse: Zeffa Kinney
- Children: Maia Kinney-Petrucha, Margo Kinney-Petrucha
- Website: www.petrucha.com

Stefan Petrucha (born January 27, 1959) is an American writer of comics and young adult fiction. He has written graphic novels in the X-Files and Nancy Drew series, as well as science fiction and horror. For 13 years, from 1994 to 2007, Petrucha wrote stories for Disney comic books published by Egmont.

== Career ==
Stefan Petrucha has been a tech writer, an educational writer, a public relations writer and an editor for trade journals. He is also a teacher of comics, and teaches three online courses on writing for comics and other skills through the University of Massachusetts.

From 2005 to 2012, Petrucha wrote two authorized Nancy Drew comic series published by Papercutz.

== Selected bibliography ==
- Making God (Between the Lines, 1997)
- Dark Ages: Assamite (White Wolf, 2002)
- Haunting the Dead: The Grass is Always Greener (White Wolf, 2003)
- The Tunnel at the End of the Light in the Time Hunter series (Telos Publishing, 2004)
- TimeTripper series
- Yestermorrow (Penguin/Razorbill 2006)
- InRage (Penguin/Razorbill 2006)
- BlindSighted (Penguin/Razorbill 2006)
- FutureImperfect (Penguin/Raozrbill 2007)
- The Shadow of Frankenstein (Dark Horse Books 2006)
- Wicked Dead series (HarperCollins 2007–2008)
- Teen, Inc. (Walker Books for Young Readers, 2007)
- The Rule of Won (Walker Books for Young Readers 2008)
- Blood Prophecy (Grand Central Publishing, 2010)
- Dead Mann Walking (Roc Books, 2011)
- Ripper (Philomel, 2012)
- Deadpool: Paws (Marvel, 2015)

=== Comics and graphic novels ===
- Squalor 4 issue limited series with Tom Sutton (First Comics, 1989–90)
- Meta-4 on-going series with Ian Gibson, cancelled after 3 issues (First Comics, 1990–91)
- Lance Barnes, Post Nuke Dick mini-series with Barry Crain (Epic Comics, 1993, collected edition Moonstone Comics, 2004)
- Duckman (Topps, 1994)
- X-Files (Topps Comics 1995–96) – also collected in trade paperbacks
- The Bandy Man (Caliber Comics, 1996)
- Kolchak: The Devil in the Details (Moonstone Comics, 2002)
- Mickey Mouse and Friends, Donald Duck and Friends, Walt Disney's Comics and Stories and other Disney comics (Gemstone Publishing, 2003–2008); stories originally written for Egmont Publishing 1994–2007)
- Nancy Drew (Papercutz, 2005–2010)
- Beowulf graphic novel (HarperCollins, 2007)
- Nancy Drew and the Clue Crew, miniseries co-written with Sarah Kinney (Papercutz, 2012)
- Harvey Beaks
- Nancy Drew Omnibus Vol. 1 (Dynamite Entertainment, 2022)
