= Nancy Drew Notebooks =

Children's book series

The Nancy Drew Notebooks are a series of books featuring the amateur sleuth Nancy Drew. The stories are aimed at younger readers and portray an 8-year-old Nancy and her friends in the third grade. Each book is illustrated with eight black and white drawings. The series original illustrator was Anthony Accardo, but later volumes were illustrated by Jan Naimo Jones and Paul Casale. The "notebook" in the series title refers to the "blue notebook in which keeps track of her [Nancy] mysteries and writes down what she learns". The stories end with a moral message telling the reader what Nancy has learned. The cover layout has changed and evolved throughout the series. It was initially published by the Minstrel imprint and later switched to the Aladdin imprint. The series ended with volume #69 in December 2005, and was relaunched (from volume 1) as Nancy Drew and the Clue Crew.

The Nancy Drew Notebooks (1994–2005)

1. The Slumber Party Secret
2. The Lost Locket
3. The Secret Santa
4. Bad Day for Ballet
5. The Soccer Shoe Clue
6. The Ice Cream Scoop
7. Trouble at Camp Treehouse
8. The Best Detective
9. The Thanksgiving Surprise
10. Not Nice on Ice
11. The Pen Pal Puzzle
12. The Puppy Problem
13. The Wedding Gift Goof
14. The Funny Face Fight
15. The Crazy Key Clue
16. The Ski Slope Mystery
17. Whose Pet is Best
18. The Stolen Unicorn
19. The Lemonade Raid
20. Hannah's Secret
21. Princess on Parade
22. The Clue in the Glue
23. Alien in the Classroom
24. The Hidden Treasures
25. Dare at the Fair
26. The Lucky Horseshoes
27. Trouble Takes the Cake
28. Thrill on the Hill
29. Lights! Camera! Clues!
30. It's No Joke
31. Fine Feathered Mystery
32. Black Velvet Mystery
33. The Gumdrop Ghost
34. Trash or Treasure
35. Third Grade Reporter
36. Make Believe Mystery
37. Dude Ranch Detective
38. Candy is Dandy
39. Chinese New Year Mystery
40. Dinosaur Alert
41. Flower Power
42. Circus Act
43. The Walkie-Talkie Mystery
44. The Purple Fingerprint
45. The Dashing Dog Mystery
46. The Snow Queen's Surprise
47. The Crook Who Took the Book
48. The Crazy Carnival Case
49. The Sand Castle Mystery
50. The Scarytales Sleepover
51. The Old-Fashioned Mystery
52. Big Worry in Wonderland
53. Recipe for Trouble
54. The Stinky Cheese Surprise
55. The Day Camp Disaster
56. Turkey Trouble
57. The Carousel Mystery
58. The Dollhouse Mystery
59. The Bike Race Mystery
60. The Lighthouse Mystery
61. Space Case
62. The Secret in the Spooky Woods
63. The Snowman Surprise
64. The Bunny-Hop Hoax
65. Strike-Out Scare
66. Zoo Clue
67. The Singing Suspects
68. The Apple Bandit
69. The Kitten Caper
