= The Sea Wolf (comic book) =

2012 comic book by Riff Reb's

The Sea Wolf (Le loup des mers)
- Page count: 136 pages
- Publisher: Soleil

Creative team
- Writer: Riff Reb's, after Jack London
- Artist: Riff Reb's
- Colorist: Riff Reb's

Original publication
- Date of publication: 31 October 2012
- Language: French
- ISBN: 9782302024359

Translation
- Publisher: Papercutz
- Date: 1 April 2014
- ISBN: 9781597073806
- Translator: Joe Johnson

The Sea Wolf (French: Le loup des mers) is a comic book by the French writer and artist Riff Reb's. It is based on Jack London's novel The Sea-Wolf and was published by Soleil on 31 October 2012.

The album was awarded the inaugural Prix de la BD Fnac. It received the 2013 Prix Saint-Michel for best artwork. Papercutz published it in English in 2014 as part of its Classics Illustrated series.
