= Melowy =

Italian children's book franchise

- Author: Danielle Star
- Translator: Chris Turner
- Illustrator: Erika De Pieri
- Country: Italy
- Language: Italian
- Discipline: Children's, Fantasy
- Publisher: Fabbri Editori, Atlantyca Dreamfarm, Scholastic
- Published: 2016-2018
- Published in English: 2018-2021
- No. of books: 15
- Website: https://www.atlantyca.com/en/department/publishing-contents-en/melowy/

Melowy is an Italian children's book and comic book series with a target demographic of girls 7-12 written by Danielle Star. The books chronicle the tale of unicorns with special wings, as well as magic abilities, during their stay at the Castle of Destiny and Castle of Chance boarding schools.

== Development ==
Danielle Star wrote the script for the first 12 books before submitting them to Alessandra Berello, publisher manager at Atlantyca Entertainment, who she began frequently chatting with on E-mail, including to discuss and approve the characters' clothes and accessories.

== Lead characters ==
- Cleo (Clio): Home realm unknown, having grown up at the Castle of Destiny and was raised by the castle's chef. Loves writing stories. She is impulsive yet loyal.
- Electra (Elettra): From the Day Realm. She is bubbly and boisterous, and loves fashion
- Selene: From the Night Realm.
- Cora (Kora): From the Winter Realm. Likes to go ice skating.
- Maya (Maia): From the Spring Realm. Likes to cook food.

== Books ==
Books
Number	Original title	English title	Original release date
1	Il sogno si avvera	Dreams Come True	March 31, 2016
2	Il canto della luna	The Song of the Moon	March 31, 2016
3	La notte del coraggio	The Night of Courage	March 31, 2016
4	L'incanto del ghiaccio	The Ice Enchantment	March 31, 2016
5	Il giorno della felicità	The Surprise Visit	May 5, 2016
6	Il libro segreto	The Secret Book	May 5, 2016
7	La forza dell'amicizia	The Power of Friendship	May 5, 2016
8	Il ballo della principessa	The Princess Ball	May 5, 2016
9	Il palazzo di cristallo	The Crystal Palace	May 26, 2016
10	La ricetta della primavera	The Spring Recipe	May 26, 2016
11	La magia di Destiny	The Magic of Destiny	May 26, 2016
12	Amiche per sempre	Friends Forever	May 26, 2016
13	In cerca del tesoro	In Search of Treasure	June 12, 2018
14	Destiny in pericolo	Destiny in Danger	June 12, 2018
15	Un sogno da salvare	A Dream to Save	October 30, 2018

== Comics ==
In contrast to the books, the comics were created in the United States by Papercutz and had English as their original language.

Melowy

Publication information
- Publisher: Papercutz
- Format: Ongoing series
- Genre: Children's, Comedy, Fantasy
- Publication date: May 2018 – present
- No. of issues: 6

Creative team
- Written by: Cortney Faye Powell
- Artist: Ryan Jampole
- Letterer: Wilson Ramos Jr
- Colorist: Laurie Smitch

Comics
Number	Title	Release date
1	The Test of Magic (Note: Also referred to as The Forest of Fears and The Challenge in The Forest.)	May 29, 2018
2	The Fashion Club of Colors	December 4, 2018
3	Time to Fly	September 10, 2019
4	Frozen in Time	June 9, 2020
5	Melloween	February 22, 2022
6	The Dream Realm	May 2, 2023

== Toys ==
A one-wave, 12-figure toyline was released in Italy in 2015 that predated both the books and the comics.

== Reception ==
The Sunday Telegraph (Sydney) wrote about Dreams Come True that "With bright coloured illustrations", "the Melowy series will appeal to new independent readers", while Kirkus Reviews wrote that while formulaic, "the audience it's carefully calculated to appeal to will probably adore it." First Comics News wrote about The Test of Magic that it was a "younger reader book but can be enjoyed by any age.", and that the characters were "adorable" and "sickly sweet", Booklist wrote that it would appeal to "Fans of whimsical, effervescent comics", while BSCKids wrote that "The characters are fun" and that the "coloring and artwork really bring out their personalities". Cairns Post listed The Night of Courage as a "Good Reads" in its Northern Family section.

The first book (Il sogno si avvera) was number 8 on the kids literature list of La Stampa Tuttolibri's publishing of Italian BookScan weekly bestsellers for 27 March through 2 April 2016. The following week, it was placed 4th in Corriere della Sera's kids literature sales charts for 11–17 April 2016.

== Translations ==
In addition to Italian and English, the books have been translated to French, Spanish, Catalan, Basque, Portuguese, Polish, Russian, and Greek. However, only the Italian version received all 15 books.
