= The Golden Sheep =

Japanese manga series

- First tankōbon volume cover, featuring Tsugu Miikura

金のひつじ (Kin no Hitsuji)
- Genre: Romance; Slice of life
- Manga
- Written by: Kaori Ozaki
- Published by: Kodansha
- English publisher: NA: Vertical
- Imprint: Afternoon KC
- Magazine: Monthly Afternoon
- Original run: September 25, 2017 – February 25, 2019
- Volumes: 3
- icon

The Golden Sheep (Japanese: 金のひつじ, Hepburn: Kin no Hitsuji) is a Japanese manga series written and illustrated by Kaori Ozaki. It was serialized in Kodansha's seinen manga magazine Monthly Afternoon from September 2017 to February 2019, with its chapters collected in three tankōbon volumes. It was licensed in North America for English release by Vertical.

== Publication ==
Written and illustrated by Kaori Ozaki, The Golden Sheep was serialized in Kodansha's seinen manga magazine Monthly Afternoon from September 25, 2017, to February 25, 2019. Kodansha collected its chapters in three tankōbon volumes, released from March 23, 2018, to April 23, 2019.

In North America, Vertical licensed the series for English release in 2018. The three volumes were released from September 24, 2019, to March 10, 2020.

=== Volumes ===
No.	Original release date	Original ISBN	English release date	English ISBN
1	March 23, 2018	978-4-06-511126-0	September 24, 2019	978-1-64659-096-4 (digital); 978-1-94719-480-9 (print)
1. "Sheep Park" (羊の公園, Hitsuji no Kōen); 2. "Happy New Life" (楽しい新生活, Tanoshī Shin Seikatsu); 3. "Dog and Rock 'n' Roll" (犬とロックンロール, Inu to Rokkunrōru); 4. "Never Say Die!" (ネバー・セイ・ダイ!, Nebā Sei Dai!); 5. "Dawn Runaways" (夜明けの家出, Yoake no Iede); 6. "Tokyo and Pop" (東京とおとん, Tōkyō to Oton)
2	September 21, 2018	978-4-06-512769-8	February 11, 2020 (digital); December 10, 2019 (print)	978-1-64659-164-0 (digital); 978-1-94719-488-5 (print)
7. "The Sky of an Unfamiliar City" (知らない街の空, Shiranai Machi no Sora); 8. "Is This a Date?!" (もしかしてデート!?, Moshikashite Dēto!?); 9. "Everyone Hates Themselves" (みんな自分が大嫌い, Minna Jibun ga Daikirai); 10. "Tokyo Tale" (上京物語, Jōkyō Monogatari); 11. "The Underdog and the Stray Cat" (負け犬と野良猫, Makeinu to Noraneko)
3	April 23, 2019	978-4-06-515183-9	March 10, 2020	978-1-64659-449-8 (digital); 978-1-94998-012-7 (print)
12. "The Princess Who Fell Off the Sheep" (羊から堕ちたお姫様, Hitsuji kara Ochita Ohimesama); 13. "Strat Girl" (ストラト少女, Sutorato Shōjo); 14. "Adieu L'Ami" (さらば友よ, Saraba Tomoyo); 15. "The Time Has Come!" (時は来た!, Toki wa Kita!); Bonus Chapter: "Hundred-meter Dash" (100メートル走, 100 Mētoru-sō); Bonus Chapter: "Love Letter" (ラブレター, Raburetā)

== Reception ==
The Golden Sheep was one of twelve manga series to make the 2021 Young Adult Library Services Association's top 126 graphic novels for teenagers list.

== See also ==
- The Gods Lie, another manga series by the same author
- Immortal Rain, another manga series by the same author
