= Caroline Roque =

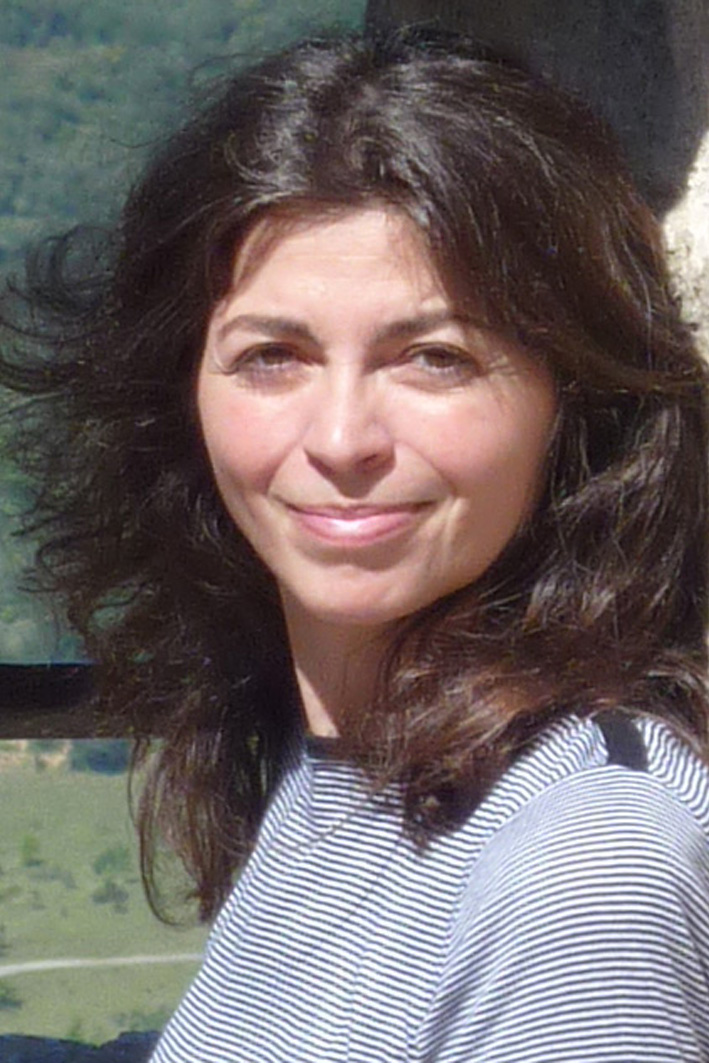
- Roque in 2016
- Born: 27 April 1975 (age 50) Perpignan, France
- Occupation: Writer
- Genre: Children's literature; Comics
- Notable awards: Prix Tangente des lycéens (2020)
- Partner: Bertrand Escaich

Caroline Roque (born 27 April 1975) is a French author of children's novels and comics.

== Biography ==
Caroline Roque was born in 1975 in Perpignan. She studied there at the Lycée Arago. Eight years later, while in the final year of a PhD in chemistry at Toulouse III – Paul Sabatier University in Toulouse, she changed direction and devoted herself to writing.

Together with Bertrand Escaich, she forms the duo Béka and writes several comic series for publishers including Bamboo Édition, Dargaud and Dupuis. They achieved notable public success in particular with Les Rugbymen, Studio Danse, and the Le jour où… series.

Roque also writes children's novelizations of the comics series Les P’tits Rugbymen and Studio Danse for Bamboo Pocket. From 2017 onwards, together with Bertrand Escaich, she co-wrote Mission Capitale, a series of children's detective novels published by Rageot.

Under her own name, she also writes illustrated picture books for younger children, published by Mijade and Auzou.

== Publications ==
=== Under the name Caroline Roque ===
- Le Monstre sur le lit, with Grégoire Mabire, Éditions Mijade, 2018 ISBN 978-2-8077-0008-6
- Une grand-mère formidable, with Estelle Meens, Mijade, 2019 ISBN 978-2-8077-0038-3
- L'école des loups, with Grégoire Mabire, Mijade, 2020 ISBN 978-2-8077-0055-0
- Le bisou de Justin, with Louis Thomas, Éditions Auzou, 2020 ISBN 978-2-7338-6832-4
- Tarzan pou explorateur, with Charles Dutertre, Auzou, 2021

=== Under the name Béka ===
- Les Fourmidables (Vol. 2), art by Vincent Deporter, Bamboo Édition/Bamboo, 2001 ISBN 2-915309-05-1
- Les Rugbymen, 16 volumes, Bamboo Édition; art by Poupard (Alexandre Mermin)
- Studio Danse, 10 volumes, Bamboo Édition; art by Crip
- Dance Class, 9 volumes, Papercutz (USA); art by Crip; translated by Joe Johson
- Les Petits Rugbymen – romans jeunesse, 5 volumes; art by Poupard; Bamboo Poche
- Studio Danse – romans jeunesse, art by Crip; Bamboo Poche
- Voyage en Chine, art by Marko, Bamboo, 2013 ISBN 978-2-8189-2303-0
- Voyage en Inde, art by Marko, Bamboo, 2014 ISBN 978-2-81892653-6
- GEO BD, art by Marko, Dargaud, 4 volumes
- Planète Gaspard, 2 volumes; art by Domas; Bamboo, 2016
- Les Aventures de Teddy Riner, 3 volumes; art by Jikko; Dargaud, 2016
- Les Fées Valentines, 4 volumes; art by Crip; Dargaud, 2016
- Le jour où..., 7 volumes; art by Marko; Bamboo, 2016
- L'Atelier Détectives, 2 volumes; art by Sandrine Goalec; Bamboo, 2017
- Le Blog de..., 4 volumes; art by Grégoire Mabire; Bamboo, 2017
- Mission Capitale, 2 volumes; novels published by Rageot
- Champignac, 3 volumes; art by David Etien; Dupuis
- Les Tuniques Bleues, Vol. 65 L'Envoyé Spécial; art by José Luis Munuera; Dupuis
