= Basse river =

Basse Agouille de Baillarou
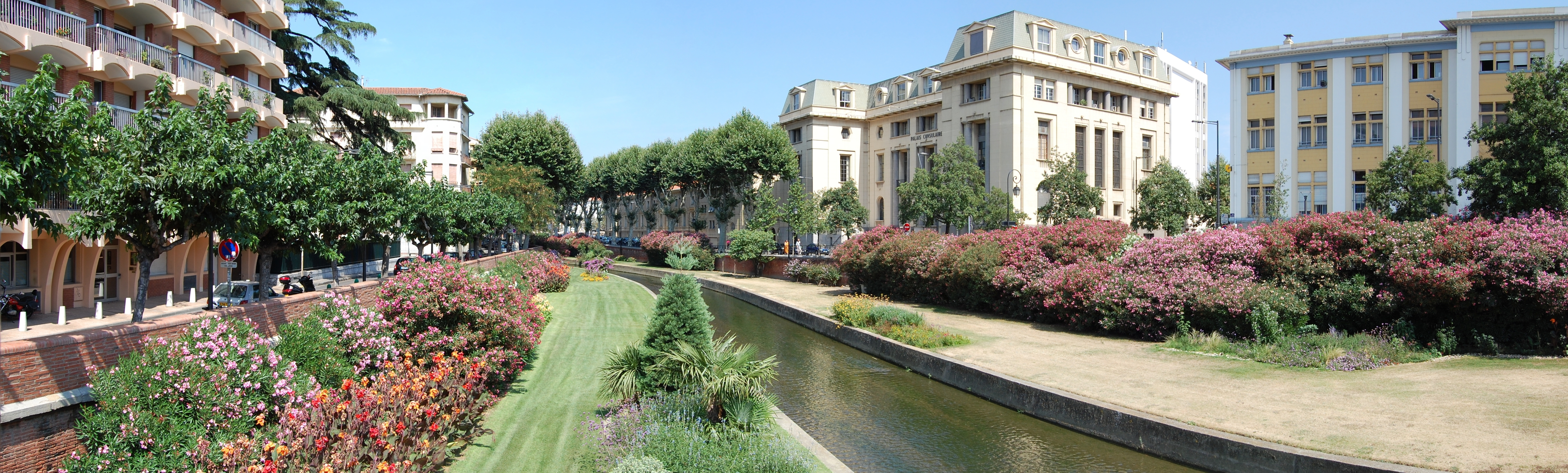

- The Arrondissement of Perpignan in the Pyrénées-Orientales department.

Physical characteristics
- Source: Serrat del Pou (234 m)
  - location: Sainte-Colombe-de-la-Commanderie
  - elevation: 180 m
- Mouth: Têt
  - location: Perpignan
  - coordinates: 42°42′19″N 2°53′58″E
  - elevation: 26 m
- Length: 16 km
- Basin size: 70 km2
- Discharge
  - location: Perpignan
  - average: 0.656 m3/s

Basin features
- Progression: France
- River system: Têt
- Tributaries
  - left: None
  - right: La Sagne; Ganganell
- Managing authority: SMBVT (Syndicat Mixte du Bassin Versant de la Têt)

The Basse (La Basse) is a river in the Pyrénées-Orientales department in the Occitanie region of southern France. It is a right-bank tributary of the Têt, which it joins in Perpignan.

== Geography ==
With a length of 16 km (9.9 mi), the Basse rises east of the small hill of Serrat del Pou (234 m (768 ft)) and about 200 metres north of Sainte-Colombe-de-la-Commanderie, southwest of Thuir. (Note: According to the municipality of Perpignan, the source would be at Roc de Majorque (440 m (1,440 ft)), less than 2 km (1.2 mi) east of Serrat del Pou.)

Until the end of the 17th century, the Basse joined the Têt near Canet. Its course was then shortened by the construction of a canal by the king's engineers.

At the entrance to Perpignan the river has been channelled (partly lined with concrete) to limit flooding. It flows past the Lycée François-Arago and the Castillet (a former fortified gate of Perpignan), and meets the Têt downstream of the Joffre bridge at an altitude of about 26 m (85 ft).

The Basse frequently experiences floods during heavy rain; its discharge can become significant even within Perpignan, for example opposite the Castillet.

=== Municipalities and cantons crossed ===
Within the Pyrénées-Orientales department, the Basse crosses six communes and several cantons: (Note: SANDRE (2011) does not list the commune of Sainte-Colombe-de-la-Commanderie, but instead Canohès, which borders the Aguilla (irrigation canal, or agouille) of Ballaro and the Perpignan canal.)

- From upstream to downstream: Sainte-Colombe-de-la-Commanderie, Thuir (source area), Ponteilla, Le Soler, Toulouges, Perpignan (confluence).

In cantonal terms, the Basse rises in the canton of Thuir and then crosses the cantons of Millas, Toulouges, Perpignan-8, Perpignan-6, before joining the Têt in the Perpignan-2, all within the Arrondissement of Perpignan.

=== Drainage basin ===
The river's drainage basin covers about 70 km^{2} (27 sq mi), whereas the Têt basin is about 1,417 km^{2} (547 sq mi) (or 1,369 km^{2} (529 sq mi) according to SANDRE), meaning the Basse represents under 5% of the total Têt basin.

=== Managing authority ===
The managing authority is the SMBVT (Syndicat Mixte du Bassin Versant de la Têt), created in 2008.

== Tributaries ==
SANDRE does not list any tributaries. However, Perpignan's environmental baseline report identifies two right-bank tributaries:

- The Sagne (right-bank)
- The Ganganell (right-bank), 7 km (4.3 mi) long, flowing through Toulouges, Canohès and Perpignan. It recorded a flood discharge of 70 m^{3}/s (2,500 cu ft/s) on 26 October 1915.

The river's Strahler number is therefore 2.

== Hydrology ==
=== The “Nouvelle Basse” at Perpignan ===
The Basse was monitored (by the Banque Hydro) from 1977 to 1991, a period of 14 years, at the station “La Nouvelle Basse à Perpignan (pont autoroute)”. The mean discharge (module) over that period was 0.656 m^{3}/s (23.2 cu ft/s), i.e. after the construction of the flood-diversion canal.

=== Floods ===
Over the monitored period, the maximum instantaneous discharge occurred on 19 October 1977 at 12:20, with 88.9 m^{3}/s (3,140 cu ft/s); the maximum instantaneous water level was 175 cm (69 in), and the maximum daily mean discharge reached 36.50 m^{3}/s (1,289 cu ft/s).

The Têt is known for very large floods, called aiguats in Catalan; the most recent major event dates to 1992 with 1,115 m^{3}/s (39,400 cu ft/s). The best-known event was the October 1940 flood, reaching 3,600 m^{3}/s (130,000 cu ft/s).

Flood events recorded on the Basse include the aiguat of 24 August 1842, as well as floods in 1915, 1959 and 1969; in 1959 the discharge reportedly reached 240 m^{3}/s (8,500 cu ft/s).

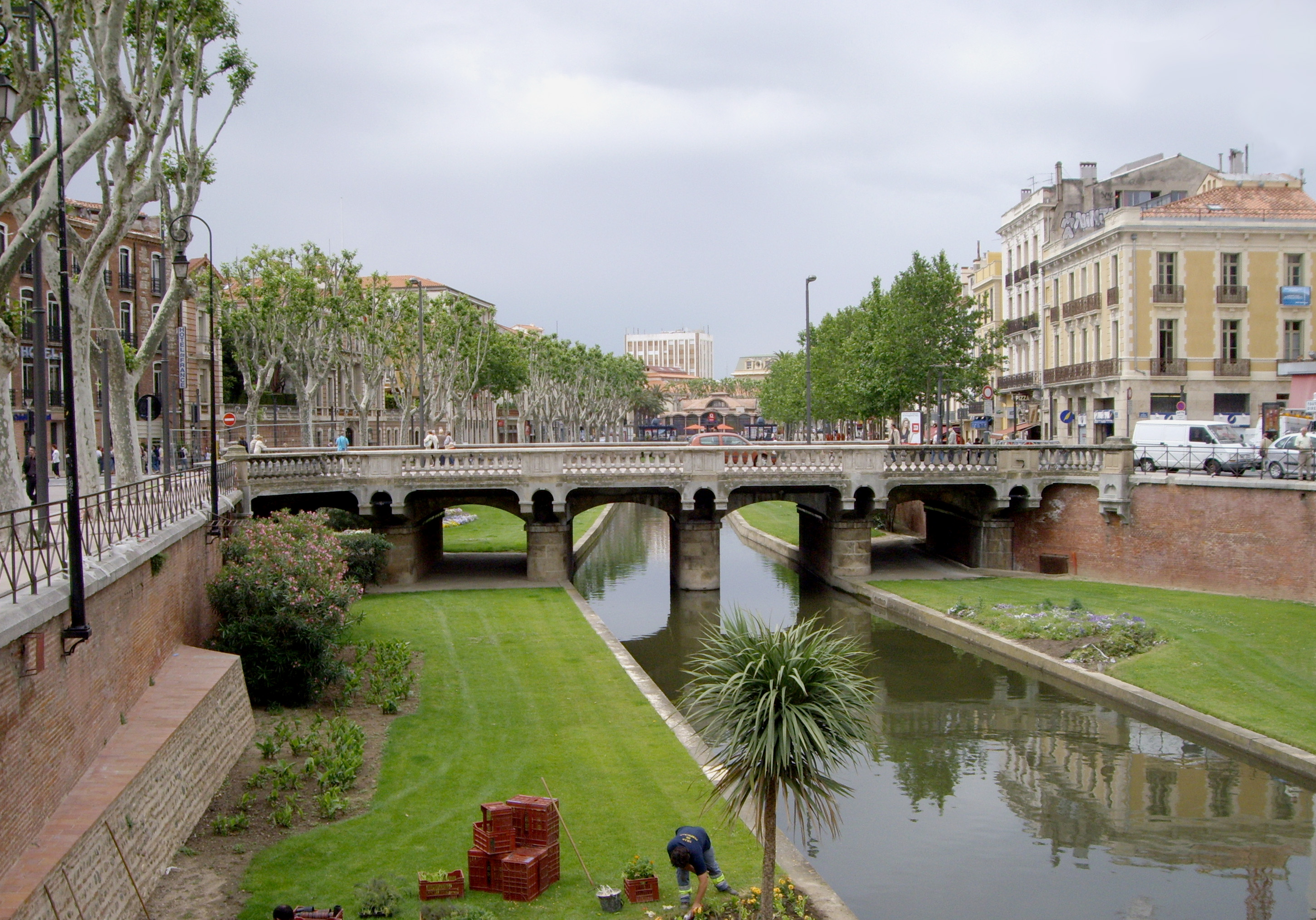
Bridge over the Basse river, in Perpignan

In 1975, a canal running alongside the A9 autoroute was built to divert flood flows towards the Têt, designed for 50-year floods on the order of 300 m^{3}/s (11,000 cu ft/s). Perpignan thereby avoided flooding on 16 October 1977, 1 March 1986, 16 November 1986 and 26 September 1992.

== Development ==
Within the commune of Toulouges, the Basse is crossed by the Perpignan–Figueres high-speed rail line.

Long inaccessible to the public, the banks of the Basse in the urban section through Perpignan are planned to be redeveloped starting in 2026 to allow, in part, pedestrian and cyclist access.

== Ecology ==
The Basse forms a “green corridor” crossing western Perpignan and provides attractive habitat for birds.

== See also ==
- Perpignan
- Têt
