= The Sea-Wolf =

1904 novel by Jack London

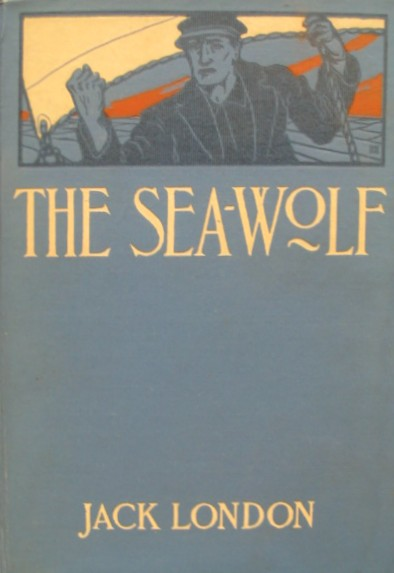
- First edition cover
- Author: Jack London
- Language: English
- Genre: Adventure novel Psychological novel
- Published: 1904, Macmillan
- Publication place: United States
- Media type: Print (Hardback & Paperback)
- Text: The Sea-Wolf at Wikisource

The Sea-Wolf is a 1904 psychological adventure novel by American writer Jack London. The book's protagonist, Humphrey Van Weyden, is a literary critic who is a survivor of an ocean collision and who comes under the dominance of Wolf Larsen, the powerful and amoral sea captain who rescues him. Its first printing of forty thousand copies was immediately sold out before publication on the strength of London's previous The Call of the Wild. Ambrose Bierce wrote, "The great thing—and it is among the greatest of things—is that tremendous creation, Wolf Larsen... the hewing out and setting up of such a figure is enough for a man to do in one lifetime... The love element, with its absurd suppressions, and impossible proprieties, is awful."

== Background ==
The personal character of the novel's antagonist "Wolf" Larsen was attributed to a real sailor London had known, Captain Alex MacLean. According to London himself, "much of the Sea-Wolf is imaginary development, but the basis is Alexander McLean". Captain Alex MacLean, or McLean, was born May 15, 1858, in East Bay, Nova Scotia. He sailed mostly in the Pacific Northwest with his brother, Captain Dan MacLean. MacLean was at one time the Sheriff of Nome, Alaska. The MacLean captains maintained their ties to Cape Breton Island despite having spent much of their lives sailing the Pacific Coast. They have living descendants.

London, who was called "Wolf" by his close friends, also used a picture of a wolf on his bookplate, and named his mansion Wolf House. Given that Van Weyden's experiences in the novel bear some resemblance to experiences London had, or heard told about, when he sailed on the Sophia Sutherland, the autodidact sailor Van Weyden has been compared to the autodidact sailor Jack London.

London's intention in writing The Sea-Wolf was "an attack on (Nietzsche's) super-man philosophy." Nietzsche and Schopenhauer are mentioned in the second sentence of the novel as the preferred reading of the friend Humphrey Van Weyden visited before his shipwreck. The novel also contains references to Herbert Spencer in chapters 8, 10, Charles Darwin in chapters 5, 6, 10, 13, Omar Khayyam in chapters 11, 17, 26, Shakespeare in chapter 5, and John Milton in chapter 26.

The plot has some initial similarities to Captains Courageous by Rudyard Kipling in that they each have an idle, rich young man rescued from the sea and shanghaied into becoming a working sailor; however, the two stories differ widely in plot and moral tone.

== Plot summary ==
The Sea-Wolf tells the story of a soft, domesticated protagonist — an intellectual man named Humphrey Van Weyden — forced to become tough and self-reliant by exposure to cruelty and brutality. The story starts with him aboard a San Francisco ferry, called Martinez, which collides with another ship in the fog and sinks. He is set adrift in the Bay, eventually being picked up by Wolf Larsen. Larsen is the captain of a seal-hunting schooner, the Ghost. Brutal and cynical, yet also highly intelligent and intellectual, he rules over his ship and terrorizes the crew with the aid of his exceptionally great physical strength. Van Weyden describes him as individualist, hedonist, and materialist. Larsen does not believe in the immortality of the soul; he finds no meaning in his life save for survival and pleasure, and he has come to despise all human life and deny its value. Being interested in someone capable of intellectual disputes, he somewhat takes care of Van Weyden, whom he calls "Hump", while forcing him to become a cabin boy, do menial work, and learn to fight to protect himself from a brutal crew.

A key event in the story is an attempted mutiny against Wolf Larsen by several members of the crew. The organizers of the mutiny are Leach and Johnson. The two were motivated by previous slights by Wolf Larsen: Johnson had previously been beaten severely by Larsen, and Leach had been punched earlier while being forced to become a boat-puller. The first attempt at mutiny involved sending Larsen overboard; however, he manages to climb back onto the ship. Searching for his assailant, he ventures into the sleeping quarters, located beneath the main deck, the only exit being a ladder. Several, at least seven men, take part in the mutiny and attack Larsen. Larsen however, demonstrating his inhuman endurance and strength, manages to fight his way through the crew, climb the ladder with several men hanging off him, and escape relatively unharmed. Van Weyden is promoted as mate, for the original mate had been murdered. Larsen later gets his vengeance by torturing his crew, and constantly claiming that he is going to murder Leach and Johnson at his earliest convenience. He later allows them to be lost to the sea when they attempt to flee on a hunting boat.

During this section, the Ghost picks up another set of castaways, including a young unmarried woman named Maud Brewster. Miss Brewster and Van Weyden had known each other previously, but only as writers. Both Wolf Larsen and Van Weyden immediately feel attraction to her, due to her intelligence and "female delicacy". Van Weyden sees her as his first true love. He strives to protect her from the crew, the horrors of the sea, and Wolf Larsen. As this happens, Wolf Larsen meets his brother Death Larsen, a bitter opponent of his. Wolf kidnapped several of Death's crew and forced them into servitude to fill his own ranks, lost previously during a storm. Larsen attempts to assault Brewster, but is stopped by one of his intense, immobilizing headaches, which allows her and Van Weyden to steal a boat and flee.

The two eventually land on an uninhabited island, heavily populated with seals. They hunt, build shelter and a fire, and survive for several days, using the strength they gained while on the Ghost. The Ghost eventually crashes on the island, with Wolf Larsen the only crew member. As a revenge, Death Larsen had tracked his brother, bribed his crew, destroyed the rigging of the sails, and set Larsen adrift at sea. It is purely by chance that Van Weyden and Miss Brewster meet Larsen again.

Van Weyden obtains all of the weapons including firearms left on the ship, but he cannot bear to murder Larsen, who does not threaten him overtly, although Van Weyden fears that Larsen could attack at any time. Van Weyden and Miss Brewster decide they can repair the ship, but Larsen, who intends to die on the island and take them with him, sabotages any repairs they make. After a headache, Larsen is rendered blind. He feigns paralysis and attempts to murder Van Weyden when he draws within arm's reach but just then has a stroke that leaves him blind and the right side of his body paralyzed. His condition only worsens; he loses usage of his remaining arm, leg, and voice. Miss Brewster and Van Weyden, unable to bring themselves to leave him to rot, care for him. Despite this kindness, he continues his resistance even in his ailing state, setting fire to the mattress of the bunk above him.

Van Weyden finishes repairing the Ghost, and he and Miss Brewster set sail. During a violent storm, Wolf Larsen dies. They give Larsen a burial at sea, an act mirroring an incident Van Weyden witnessed when he was first rescued. The story ends with the two being rescued by an American revenue cutter – after sharing a first kiss at the end of a long and harrowing adventure.

== Characters ==
=== Humphrey "Hump" Van Weyden ===
Humphrey Van Weyden starts the book weak of body but strong of mind. He grows stronger as the story progresses, physically through the manual labor, and spiritually as he endures the various hardships, including his tumultuous relationship with Wolf Larsen. Upon meeting Maud Brewster, he realizes just how much he has changed, gaining muscle mass, a more rugged appearance, and a different outlook on life.

Van Weyden has a unique relationship with Wolf Larsen. Though he is in effect the captain's prisoner, Larsen shows him favoritism and occasionally acts as a father figure, giving advice on how to survive aboard the ship. Though Larsen claims to take Van Weyden aboard primarily because he needed an additional hand, he also seems to genuinely believe he is doing something good for Van Weyden. He claims that Van Weyden has never "stood on his own legs", meaning he has never had to work and always relied on his inheritance from his father to survive. Throughout the book, Larsen compliments Van Weyden on his growth, eventually telling him he is proud of him, and calling him a real man, able to stand on his own legs.

Van Weyden has an ideology that is in sharp contrast to Larsen's. He believes in the eternal soul and that men should act justly under all circumstances. His views are constantly being challenged by Larsen, who encourages him to give in to his desires and behave in an amoral fashion. Van Weyden resists Larsen's influence and retains his original ideology. By the end of the story, Larsen is annoyed that Van Weyden still clings to his beliefs and refuses to avenge himself upon Larsen, despite all the suffering Larsen has put him through.

=== Wolf Larsen ===
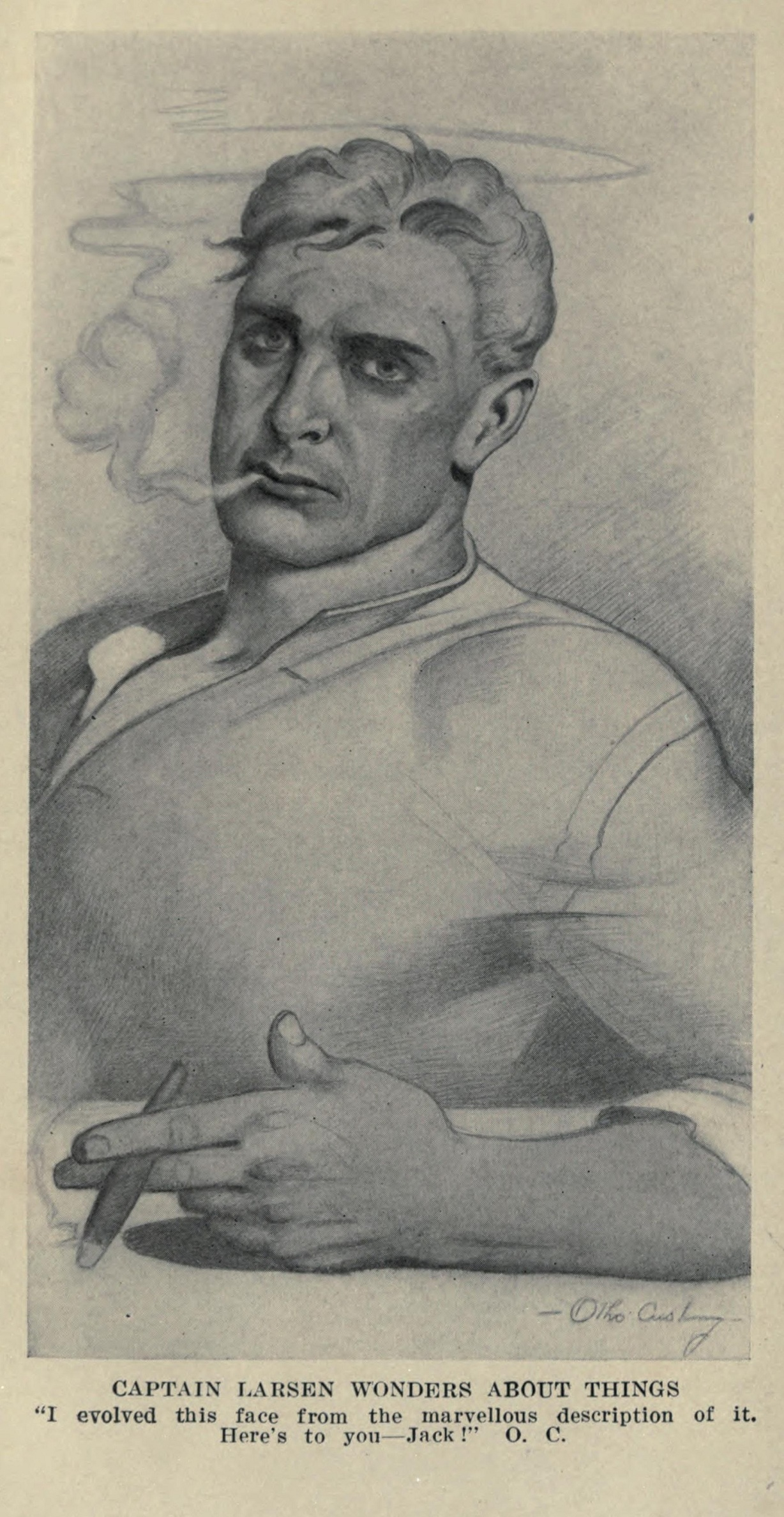
A drawing of Wolf Larsen

Physically, Larsen is described as approximately 5 feet 10 inches (1.78 m) in height, with a massive build: broad shoulders and a deep chest. He displays tremendous strength throughout the story. Van Weyden describes Larsen as beautiful on more than one occasion, perfectly symmetrical, a perfect specimen of masculinity. Yet his true strength is described as something more primal, more primitive, and animalistic. This animalistic strength is representative of London's belief in Social Darwinism; Wolf Larsen's body had adapted so that Larsen could best survive on the sea and among sailors. He is extremely intelligent, having taught himself a variety of fields, including mathematics, literature, science, philosophy, and technology.

Larsen was born in Norway, though he is of Danish descent. He spent his entire life at sea: cabin-boy at twelve, ship's boy at fourteen, seaman at sixteen, able seaman at seventeen. He has several brothers, but only Death Larsen is mentioned.

Larsen displays characteristics similar to what would later be described as sociopathy. He has absolutely no qualms about manipulating and bullying people to better serve his needs. He routinely takes men hostage, castaways such as Van Weyden and seal hunters from other ships, and uses them to fill his own ranks when needed. He murders and abuses people without hesitation, seeing no value in life. He enjoys the intellectual stimulation that Van Weyden and Miss Brewster provide, but Van Weyden describes their relationship as one between a king and his jester. According to Van Weyden, he is only a toy to Larsen. The only other activities in which Larsen seems to find joy is facing death and being in extreme danger because it allows him to test himself; these dangerous situations range from storms on the ocean to tormenting or fighting his crew men.

Despite his immense internal strength, Larsen at times shows signs of weakness and depression. He is envious of his brother, because his brother is simple minded, and so is able to enjoy life unburdened. He also claims he is envious of Miss Brewster's and Van Weyden's faith, but later says it is only his mind, and he knows he is better off without it. He also speaks of frustration that he never amounted to anything great. He claims that he had all the determination and will required, but was never given the proper opportunity. Wolf also suffers from headaches throughout the novel, yet claims to have never gotten sick before.

Wolf is not Larsen's real given name, a fact known to the crew of the Ghost. His genuine given name is never revealed. Dialogue heavily implies that he is called "Wolf" because of his nature and viciousness, and, for similar reasons, his brother is called "Death".

London was an outspoken member of the Socialist Party. Wolf Larsen portrays capitalists as people who care only for themselves and are willing to destroy other people for personal gain. Larsen injures and kills his sailors without hesitation, except when the loss of a sailor would harm the productivity of seal hunting which would harm the profits for Larsen; this is a dramatic representation of capitalism and capitalists harming poor people.

The word "Wolf" has the highest number of occurrences in the novel, appearing 422 times. The name "Larsen" comes second, with 363 appearances.

=== Maud Brewster ===
Maud Brewster is "captured" by Wolf Larsen just as Van Weyden was. She is rich and her work involves writing: she tells Wolf and Humphrey that she earns 1800 dollars a year, but would need a typewriter, pen and paper to work on the ship. She is not accustomed to doing things for herself. She is twenty-seven years old and beautiful. As a captive on Larsen's boat, she uses her intelligence to survive. Miss Brewster has the ability to stare into people's eyes and tell their emotions.

Her beliefs are similar to Van Weyden, and she has read widely. It is the introduction of Miss Brewster that adds a romantic element (albeit a chaste one) onto a maritime adventure novel. When Van Weyden decides that Larsen is too dangerous and may harm Brewster, Van Weyden and Brewster make an escape from the Ghost and Larsen.

== Adaptations ==
=== Films ===
Jack London's novel has been adapted for motion pictures:

- The Sea Wolf (1913), a silent motion picture starring Hobart Bosworth, with author Jack London appearing as an unnamed sailor
- The Sea Wolf (1920), a silent motion picture starring Noah Beery (Larsen) and Tom Forman (Van Weyden)
- The Sea Wolf (1926), a silent motion picture starring Ralph Ince and Claire Adams (Maud)
- The Sea Wolf (1930), starring Milton Sills and the former USRC Bear as the sealer Macedonia
- The Sea Wolf (1941), starring Edward G. Robinson (Larsen), Ida Lupino (Ruth), and John Garfield
- Wolf Larsen (1958), starring Barry Sullivan and Peter Graves
- Der Seewolf (Germany, 1971, television , 4 part miniseries), starring Raimund Harmstorf and Edward Meeks
- Legend of the Sea Wolf (Italy, 1975), starring Chuck Connors and Giuseppe Pambieri
- Morskoj volk (USSR, 1990, television ), starring Liubomiras Lauciavicius and Andrei Rudensky
- The Sea Wolf (1993, television ), starring Christopher Reeve and Charles Bronson
- The Sea Wolf (1997), starring Stacy Keach
- The Sea Wolf (also known as SeaWolf: The Pirate's Curse, 2002), starring Thomas Ian Griffith
- The Sea Wolf (ProSieben, Germany, 2008), starring Thomas Kretschmann
- Sea Wolf (ZDF, Canada/Germany, 2009), starring Sebastian Koch, Stephen Campbell Moore, Neve Campbell and Tim Roth. Produced by TeleMünchen

=== Other ===
Screen Director's Playhouse adapted - The Sea Wolf - Edward G. Robinson re-creates his role of the amoral sea captain Wolf Larsen for radio on Feb. 3, 1950

The book was adapted in four hour-long episodes for BBC Radio 4 by Ed Thomason, and was first broadcast in 1991. It featured Jack Klaff as Wolf, Kerry Shale as Van Weyden and Ian Dury as Mugridge.

The comic book The Sea Wolf by Riff Reb's is based on London's novel. It was published in French in 2012 and received the Prix de la BD Fnac. An English translation appeared in 2014.

In Ray Nayler's 2022 novel The Mountain in the Sea, an autonomously-piloted fishing ship is named the Sea Wolf, and its slave crew find "Wolf Larsen, Captain" stenciled on the armored steel door of its wheelhouse.
