= Nancy Drew and the Clue Crew =

Book series

Nancy Drew and the Clue Crew is a book series featuring a grade-school-aged Nancy Drew. Like the Nancy Drew Notebooks, the series is aimed at a younger audience.

== Main series ==
Nancy Drew and the Clue Crew is illustrated by Macky Pamintuan.

1. Sleepover Sleuths (2006)
2. Scream for Ice Cream (2006)
3. Pony Problems (2006)
4. The Cinderella Ballet Mystery (2006)
5. Case of the Sneaky Snowman (2006)
6. The Fashion Disaster (2007)
7. The Circus Scare (2007)
8. Lights, Camera . . . Cats! (2007)
9. The Halloween Hoax (2007)
10. Ticket Trouble (2007)
11. Ski School Sneak (2007)
12. Valentine's Day Secret (2007)
13. Chick-Napped! (2008)
14. The Zoo Crew (2008)
15. Mall Madness (2008)
16. Thanksgiving Thief (2008)
17. Wedding Day Disaster (2008)
18. Earth Day Escapade (2009)
19. April Fool's Day (2009)
20. Treasure Trouble (2009)
21. Double Take (2009)
22. Unicorn Uproar (2009)
23. Babysitting Bandit (2009)
24. Princess Mix-Up Mystery (2009)
25. Buggy Breakout (2010)
26. Camp Creepy (2010)
27. Cat Burglar Caper (2010)
28. Time Thief (2011)
29. Designed for Disaster (2011)
30. Dance Off (2011)
31. The Make-a-Pet Mystery (2012)
32. Cape Mermaid Mystery (2012)
33. The Pumpkin Patch Puzzle (2012)
34. Cupcake Chaos (2013)
35. Cooking Camp Disaster (2013)
36. Secret of the Scarecrow (2013)
37. The Flower Show Fiasco (2014)
38. A Musical Mess (2014)
39. Museum Mayhem (2014), illustrated by Peter Francis
40. Butterfly Blues (2014), illustrated by Peter Francis

== Graphic novel series ==
Nancy Drew and the Clue Crew children's graphic novel series written by Sarah Kinney, with art by Stan Goldberg.

1. Small Volcanoes (2012)
2. Secret Sand Sleuths (2013)
3. Enter the Dragon Mystery (2013)

== Reception ==
In 2008, Nancy Drew and the Clue Crew #10: Ticket Trouble (2007) by Stacia Deutsch and Rhody Cohon was nominated for a Scribe Award in the category of Best Young Adult Original.
