= Squalor (comics) =

Squalor was a 4-issue limited series published by First Comics which ran from December 1989 through March 1990 and was created by Stefan Petrucha (writer) and Tom Sutton (penciller). The covers for each issue were painted by Jeffrey K. Potter, known for the covers he had provided for science fiction magazines such as Analog, Twilight Zone, and Asimov's.

Squalor was notable in that it was Petrucha's debut as a comic book writer; he had previously published other works of fiction, and was working as a technical writer when Squalor was published.

== Plot summary ==
The titular main character, Squalor, is a former theoretical physicist who specializes in non-linear time. He devised a theory that there was a single state outside the timestream where the rules of cause and effect do not apply, which he called "A-Time". Due to the radical nature of this theory, he was institutionalized.

At the opening of the series, he has recently been released from a mental hospital and has somehow gained the ability to travel into A-Time, where he discovers a plot by extradimensional beings to invade our reality. This seems to be further evidence of his insanity to those around him until he starts to display knowledge of secret and/or future events such as what a waitress thinks a ketchup stain looks like.

He later discovers the ability to bring other people into A-Time with him, and uses his knowledge of the past and present gained from being outside the timestream to simulate other powers.

Though only four issues of Squalor were published, Stefan Petrucha later returned to the concept of A-Time in the TimeTripper novel series.
