= Philippe Arbos =

French geographer

Philippe Arbos (30 July 1882 – 28 October 1956) was a French geographer known for his work on pastoralism in the French Alps.

Arbos was born to Philipe and Adèle Cantié in Mosset in the French Pyrenees and was educated at Arago College, Perpignan and the Lycée Louis-le-Grand, Khagne. He was influenced by Raoul Blanchard who he met in 1902. He joined the École normale supérieure in 1904 where his contemporary was Jule Romains. After graduating in 1907 he became a teacher in Toulon and then at Grenoble. He received a doctorate in 1923 and joined the University of Clermont-Ferrand. His main work was on the pastoral life in the French Alps. He retired in 1952.

Arbos married Édith Perouze in 1910 and they had a daughter, Lucienne.
