= Taboo Tattoo =

Japanese manga series

- Cover of the first Japanese volume

タブー・タトゥー
- Genre: Action, dark fantasy
- Manga
- Written by: Shinjirō
- Published by: Media Factory
- English publisher: NA: Yen Press
- Magazine: Monthly Comic Alive
- Original run: November 2009 – June 2017
- Volumes: 13
- Anime television series
- Directed by: Takashi Watanabe
- Produced by: Hiroyuki Tanaka; Yosuke Takabayashi; Mika Shimizu; Taro Iwahana; Shunsuke Matsumura; Jun Fukuda; Yasuhiro Iwasawa
- Written by: Mayori Sekijima; Masamitsu Ōtake
- Music by: Shinji Hosoe (SuperSweep)
- Studio: J.C.Staff
- Licensed by: NA: Crunchyroll
- Original network: TV Tokyo, AT-X, BS Japan
- Original run: July 4, 2016 – September 19, 2016
- Episodes: 12

Taboo Tattoo (タブー・タトゥー) is a Japanese action seinen manga series written and illustrated by Shinjirō. It was serialized by Media Factory in its Monthly Comic Alive magazine between November 2009 and June 2017. The series was compiled into thirteen volumes between 2010 and 2017. The series is published in French by Bamboo Édition's Doki-Doki imprint. An anime adaptation was greenlit and aired from July 2016 to September 2016. The manga has been licensed for release in English by Yen Press.

== Plot ==
After saving a homeless man from some thugs, Seigi receives a strange tattoo from the man as a gift. This act leads to a series of events that will pull Seigi into the middle of a conflict between a special U.S. Army unit and the Kingdom of Selinistan as they scramble to collect "Power Crests", weaponized ancient artifacts with the ability to shift the balance of power in the world.

== Characters ==
=== U.S. forces and allies ===
Justice "Seigi" Akatsuka (赤塚 正義 (セーギ), Akatsuka Jasutisu (Sēgi))
Voiced by: Makoto Furukawa (Japanese); Justin Briner (English)
Seigi has a strong sense of justice and ends up receiving a mysterious tattoo after rescuing a homeless man from some thugs. Seigi has trained in the Akatsuka-style of jujitsu since childhood under the supervision of his enthusiastic grandfather. His Power Crest, "Void Maker", allows him to create black holes and regenerate from injuries; it's also one of the few tattoos which does not require a trigger like the others. Due to his parents having "weird ideas" when he was born, his given name is written in kanji but pronounced as the English word. Seigi preferentially goes by his nickname, the traditional Japanese pronunciation of his given name.
Bluesy "Izzy" Fruesy (ブリージィ・フルージィ (イジー), Burījii Furūjii (Ijī))
Voiced by: Mikako Komatsu (Japanese); Monica Rial (English)
Bluesy, aka "Izzy", is a mysterious girl who appears before Seigi. Izzy has overwhelming physical power thanks to her Power Crest, which gives control over air. She's a U.S. Army lieutenant in charge of recovering the tattoos in Japan. Despite appearing to be of high school age, Izzy is older than Tom, a side effect of her Power Crest stopping her aging. She later loses her left arm during a battle with Cal.
Tōko Ichinose (一ノ瀬 桃子 (トーコ), Ichinose Tōko (Tōko))
Voiced by: Chika Anzai (Japanese); Jad Saxton (English)
Touko is Seigi's classmate and childhood friend, she also has a not-so-subtle crush on him. Her most distinguishing feature is her well-developed body compared to other girls her age. After being possessed by Iltutmish, she accidentally gets a Power Crest in her forehead which (like all Power Crests) increases her physical abilities when activate. She is later killed and devoured by a monstrous Iltutmish causing Seigi to fall into despair.
Tom Shredfield (トム＝シュレッドフィールド, Tomu Shureddofīrudo)
Voiced by: Tomokazu Sugita (Japanese); Chris Bevins (English)
An otaku with a love for moe characters working as Izzy's subordinate. He possesses a copied Power Crest known as "Noise Canceller" which allows him to negate the powers of other tattoo users. Because of his lacking fighting prowess, he's often ends up injured after every confrontation.
Lisa Lovelock (リサ・ラブロック, Risa Raburokku)
Voiced by: Eri Kitamura (Japanese); Jamie Marchi (English)
The commander of the Curse Unit of the U.S. Army and a good friend of Izzy. Nicknamed "Foxfire", her Power Crest allows her to create fiery explosions using the components in the air, she often teases Izzy about her small bust.
Colonel Sanders (サンダース, Sandāsu)
Voiced by: Tesshō Genda (Japanese); Christopher Sabat (English)
A Brigadier General in the U.S. Army who prefers to be called "Colonel", he's a patriot as well as the leading member of the tattoo program. Even after losing his right arm, both legs, and even his vision in the fight against Cal, he refuses to let his disabilities hold him back.
Souha Tamaki (玉城 走破, Tamaki Souha)
Voiced by: Nobuyuki Hiyama (Japanese); Ricco Fajardo (English)
A soldier from the Japan Self-Defense Forces and one of the few Japanese Power Crest users, he offers to help Seigi and his group. Much like Tom, Tamaki's also an otaku and the pair quickly become friends. Later on, he proposes to his girlfriend (who's also an Otaku) despite knowing that could rise death flags. Nicknamed "Bull Demon", his Power Crest allows him to warp dimensions around himself to accelerate at incredible speeds, ignoring all possible damage to his body.

=== Independents ===
Brad Blackstone "BB" (ブラッド・ブラックストーン, Buraddo Burakkusutōn)
Voiced by: Toshiyuki Morikawa (Japanese); J. Michael Tatum (English)
A highly skilled combatant whose motives are unclear. He's an old acquaintance of Izzy and a defector from both the U.S. Army and Kingdom. Like that of Seigi, Brad also possesses the Void Maker, but Brad's Power Crest is killing him slowly. He becomes a mentor of sorts towards Seigi, but later on sacrifices himself in order to save Seigi and Izzy, with his soul and memories being transferred over to the former.
Professor Wiseman (ワイズマン, Waizuman)
Voiced by: Show Hayami (Japanese); Jeremy Schwartz (English)
A renegade American scientist who absconded the country with a number of Power Crests, one of which being Void Maker which he later gave to Seigi as thanks for saving his life. He also helps Brad Blackstone in order to access and modify the source code of his tattoo.

=== Kingdom of Selinistan ===
Aryabhata "Arya" (アリヤバータ, Ariyabāta)
Voiced by: Akari Kitō (Japanese); Carli Mosier (English)
The princess of the Kingdom of Selinistan. A nationalist who desires world domination, she seized power in a coup d'état which killed both of her peace-minded parents. Aryabhata wishes to change the world to suit her own ends, regardless of what others may think or feel. She strikes a beautiful figure, and comports herself with dignity, but her love of games is unequaled. Like Seigi, her Power Crest doesn't require a trigger, Arya's Power Crest allows her linked to the source of all other Power Crests, thereby allowing her to utilize any other power at will. Created as a tool to control the Power Crests, once she found out about the abuse and cruel experiments perpetrated by the king, her resentment towards humanity drove her to want to rewrite the world.
Iltutmish "Il" (イルトゥトゥミシュ, Irututumishu)
Voiced by: Shiori Izawa (Japanese); Sarah Wiedenheft (English)
A girl member of Brahman, who has pledged her allegiance to Arya. Nicknamed "Schrödinger's Cat", her Power Crest allows her to possess others as well as phase through matter so long as someone acknowledges her presence. She and Lurker have a pet capybara named "Mickey" and later on adopt a one-eyed kitten they find on the street. With Arya's power, Il can also turn herself into a giant, black smilodon.
Cal Shekar (カル・シェーカル, Karu Shēkaru)
Voiced by: Hitomi Nabatame (Japanese); Rachel Robinson (English)
A loyal servant and close aide to the princess, Cal's the Vice-Commander of Brahman. Nicknamed "Aegis Armadillo", her Power Crest allows her to create powerful barriers that can be used to block incoming attacks as well as cut nearly anything, she's also a deadly swordswoman as well. Despite her serious demeanor, she's easily frustrated by Arya's antics. She also admits to being in love with Brad but he turns her down in favor of Izzy.
R.R. Lurker (R・R・ラーカー, Āru Āru Rākā)
Voiced by: Kenjiro Tsuda (Japanese); Andrew Love (English)
A sadistic, whip-wielding man working under Arya, Lurker is a member of Brahman. He later develops an obsession with Izzy because of his Lolita Complex and the fact she blasted off two of his fingers. Nicknamed "Behemoth Viper", his Power Crest allows him to increase the mass of his whip (and possibly other items), allowing him to rip apart rock and metal as easily as he can flesh and bone.
Kujuri (クジュリ)
Voiced by: Ai Kayano (Japanese); Tia Ballard (English)
One of Arya's "clone" sisters who doesn't hate humanity like her. She explained BB the origins of Arya and why she wants to remake the world.

== Media ==
=== Anime ===
An anime adaptation produced by J.C.Staff was announced. It was initially slated to premiere in 2015, but it broadcast between July 4, 2016, and September 19, 2016. The anime was released across six Blu-ray volumes. The opening theme is "Belief" by May'n, while the ending theme is "EGOISTIC EMOTION" by idol unit TRIGGER, which is composed of Izzy's and Tōko's voice actors, Mikako Komatsu and Chika Anzai respectively. Crunchyroll has licensed the series in North America, while Funimation released it on home video as part of the two companies' partnership.
