= Bamboo Édition =

French comics publisher

- Founded: 1997
- Founder: Olivier Sulpice
- Country of origin: France
- Headquarters location: Charnay-lès-Mâcon, France
- Publication types: Comics
- Imprints: Doki-Doki, Fluide Glacial
- Official website: www.bamboo.fr

Bamboo Édition is a French comics publisher, mostly specializing in humor series. Their manga imprint, Doki-Doki, was established in April 2006.

== Doki-Doki titles ==
- 7 Billion Needles
- Antimagia
- Atori shō
- Aya no shiki
- Broken Blade
- Freezing
- Fujoshi Rumi
- Hanayamata
- Hyakkiyakō shō
- Iris Zero
- Laz Meridian
- Musunde Hiraite
- :REverSAL
- Sasuga no Sarutobi
- Taboo-Tattoo
- Vamos Lá!
- The Sisters (fr)

== See also ==
- List of manga publishers
