= List of disasters in France by death toll =

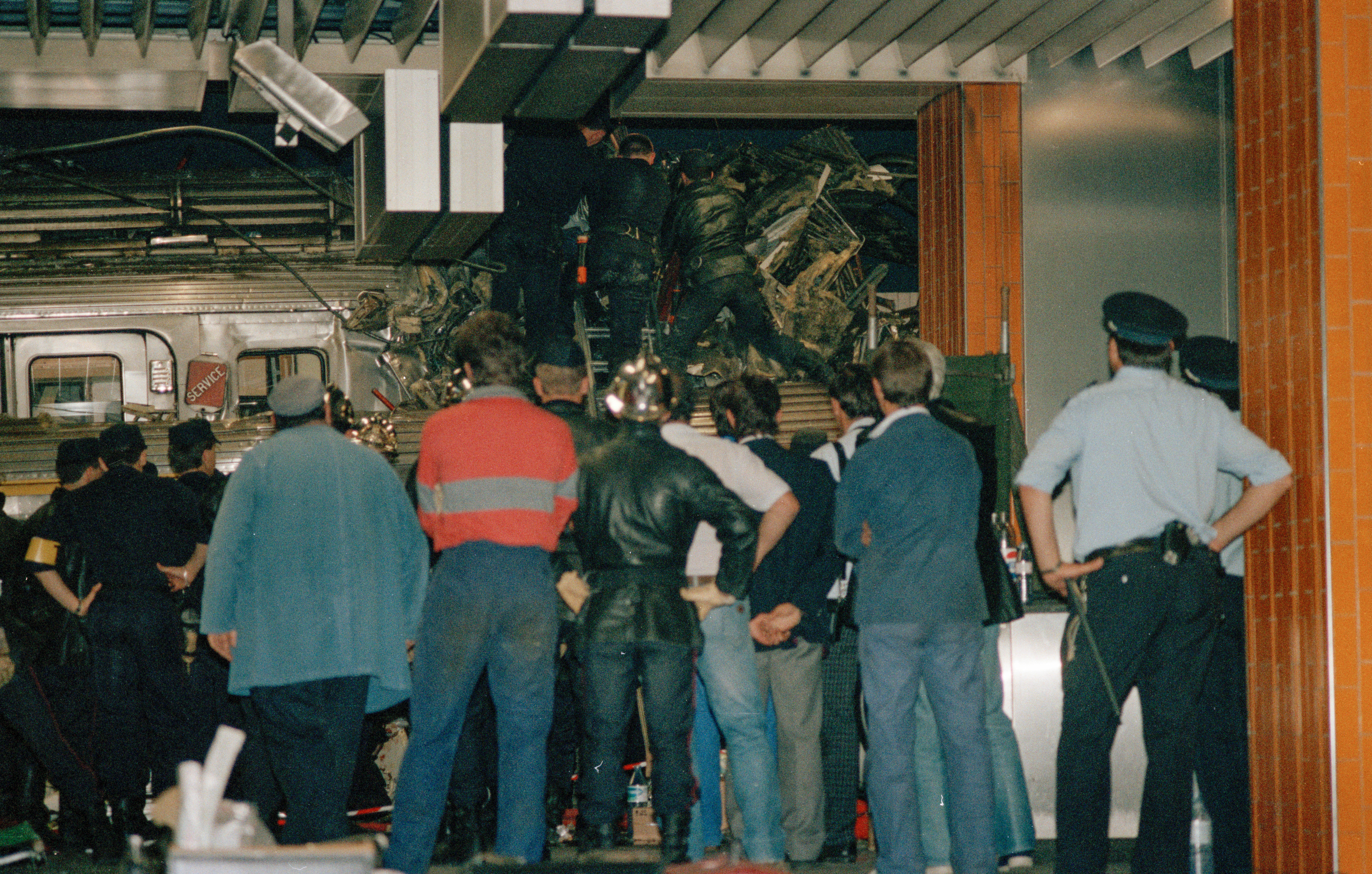
In 1988 a train collision at the Gare de Lyon in Paris killed 56, resulting in the deadliest train accident during peacetime in French history.

This list of French disasters by death toll includes major disasters (excluding acts of war) that occurred on French soil (including overseas territories) or involved French citizens, in a definable incident, where the loss of life was 10 or more.

== 200 or more deaths ==
Fatalities	Year	Article	Type	Location	Comments
5,000,000-10,000,000	1347-1352	Black Death in France	Pandemic	Metropolitan France	
168,091	2020–present	COVID-19 pandemic in France	Pandemic	Nationwide	
30,000	1902	1902 eruption of Mount Pelée	Volcanic eruption	Martinique	
~6,000	1776	1776 Pointe-à-Pitre hurricane	Hurricane	Guadeloupe	
~5,000	1219	Flood of Grenoble (1219)	Flood	Grenoble, Isère	
2,025+	2026–present	2026 European heatwaves	Heatwave	Metropolitan France	
1,777	1884	1884 Marseille cholera epidemic	Epidemic	Marseille, Bouches-du-Rhône	
1,203	1928	1928 Okeechobee hurricane	Hurricane	Guadeloupe and Martinique	
1,150	1796	Sinking of the Séduisant	Shipwreck	Bay of Biscay	
1,099	1906	Courrières mine disaster	Mine explosion	Courrières, Pas-de-Calais	
871+	1944	Explosion of the Sadi-Carnot shelter	Explosion	Brest, Finistère	Lowest estimate including German troops.
693	1855	Sinking of the French frigate Sémillante	Shipwreck	Offshore of Corsica	
675	1917	Saint-Michel-de-Maurienne derailment	Train derailment	Saint-Michel-de-Maurienne, Savoie	
568	1920	Sinking of the SS Afrique	Shipwreck	Offshore of Île de Ré, Charente-Maritime	
562	1898	SS La Bourgogne disaster	Ship collision	Atlantic Ocean off of Newfoundland, Canada	
542 (French)	2004	2004 Indian Ocean earthquake and tsunami	Tsunami	Thailand, Indonesia, Sri Lanka	
530-650	1794	Grenelle Powder Mill explosion	Explosion	Grenelle, Paris	
500	1564	1564 Roquebillière earthquake	Earthquake	Roquebillière, Alpes-Maritimes	
~500	1678	Aves Islands shipwrecks	Shipwrecks	Las Aves Archipelago, Venezuela	
476	1875	1875 Garonne flood	Flood	Haute-Garonne, Tarn-et-Garonne, and Lot-et-Garonne	
467+	1931	Saint-Philibert disaster	Shipwreck	Off of Noirmoutier, Vendée	
423	1959	Malpasset Dam collapse	Dam collapse	near Fréjus, Var	
380+	1810	Sinking of the Elizabeth	Shipwreck	Offshore of Dunkirk, Nord	
346	1974	Turkish Airlines Flight 981	Plane crash	Fontaine-Chaalis, Oise	
323	2009	2009 swine flu pandemic in France	Pandemic	Metropolitan France	
300-4,000	1839	1839 Martinique earthquake	Earthquake	Martinique	
286	1911	Loss of the French battleship Liberté	Ship explosion	Toulon, Var	
230+	1930	1930 flooding of the Tarn	Flood	Southwest France	
226	1873	Sinking of the Ville-du-Havre	Shipwreck	North Atlantic Ocean	
225	1788	Disappearance of the French frigates Astrolabe and La Boussole	Shipwrecks	Vanikoro Island, Solomon Islands	
220	1866	Sinking of the SS London	Shipwreck	Bay of Biscay	
214	1933	Lagny-Pomponne rail accident	Train collision	Pomponne, Seine-et-Marne	
203	2005-2006	Chikungunya epidemic in Reunion Island	Epidemic	Réunion	
200	1850	Angers Bridge collapse	Bridge collapse	Angers, Maine-et-Loire	
~200	1856	Flood of 1856 in France	Flood	Metropolitan France	

== 100 to 199 deaths ==
Fatalities	Year	Article	Type	Location	Comments
196	1939	Explosion of the Minelayer Pluton	Ship explosion	Casablanca, Morocco	
180	1981	Inex-Adria Aviopromet Flight 1308	Plane crash	Ajaccio, Corsica	
156	1910	Sinking of the Général Chanzy	Shipwreck	Off of Menorca, Spain	
151 (French)	2005	West Caribbean Airways Flight 708	Plane crash	Machiques, Venezuela	
150	2015	Germanwings Flight 9525	Plane crash (suicide by pilot)	Prads-Haute-Bléone, Alpes-de-Haute-Provence	
146	1970	Club Cinq-Sept fire	Nightclub fire	Saint-Laurent-du-Pont, Isère	
146	1854	1854 Montbrehain cholera epidemic	Epidemic	Montbrehain, Aisne	
130	1962	Air France Flight 007	Plane crash	Orly, Val-de-Marne	
126	1897	1897 Bazar de la Charité	Building fire	Paris	
126	1953	Disappearance of the ''Monique''	Shipwreck	Between Maré and Grande Terre, New Caledonia	
125+	1909	Sinking of the SS Hilda	Shipwreck	Saint-Malo, Ille-et-Vilaine	
123	1973	Varig Flight 820	Plane crash	Orly, Val-de-Marne	
120	1907	Iéna disaster	Ship fire	Toulon, Var	
117	1966	Air India Flight 101	Plane crash	Mont Blanc, Haute-Savoie	
113	2000	Air France Flight 4590	Plane crash	Gonesse, Val-d'Oise	
113	1962	Air France Flight 117	Plane crash	Guadeloupe	
108	1972	Vierzy tunnel disaster	Tunnel collapse	Vierzy, Aisne	
107	1601	1601 Chèze avalanche	Avalanche	Chèze, Hautes-Pyrénées	
104	1916	Explosion of the Dix-huit Ponts depot	Explosion	Lille, Nord	Occurred during German occupation in the First World War. Whether the explosion was an accident or caused by sabotage is unknown.
100	1918	Explosion of the Beaussenq Ammunition Depot	Explosion	Saint-Martin-de-Crau, Bouches-du-Rhône	
~100	1952	Baumol powder affair	Health disaster	Metropolitan France, especially Brittany	

== 50 to 99 deaths ==
Fatalities	Year	Article	Type	Location	Comments
94	1968	Air France Flight 1611	Plane crash	Mediterranean Sea	
93	1869	Sinking of the French corvette Gorgone	Shipwreck	Pierres Noires, Finistère	
89	1867	Third Cinq Sous Mine Disaster	Mine explosion	Montceau-les-Mines, Saône-et-Loire	
88	1967	1967 Air Ferry DC-4 accident	Plane crash	Canigó, Pyrénées-Orientales	
88	1999	Cyclone Lothar	Cyclone	Northern France	
87	1992	Air Inter Flight 148	Plane crash	Vosges Mountains, Bas-Rhin	
86	1895	Bouzey Dam disaster	Dam collapse	Vosges	
86	1911	Sinking of the Émir	Ship collision	Strait of Gibraltar	
84	1903	Paris Métro train fire	Train fire	Paris	
84	1955	1955 Le Mans disaster	Motor racing crash	Le Mans, Sarthe	
84	1887	Opéra-Comique fire	Building fire	Paris	
82	1949	1949 Landes forest fire	Forest fire	Landes forest	
80+	1871	1871 Saint-Nazaire disaster	Train explosion	Ollioules, Var	
79	1912	La Clarence mine disaster	Mine explosions	Divion, Pas-de-Calais	
78	1973	Pan Am Flight 816	Plane crash	near Papeete, French Polynesia	
76 (French)	1918	Loss of the French minesweepers Inkerman and Cerisoles	Shipwrecks	Lake Superior	
75	1845	1845 Montville tornado	Tornado	Seine-Maritime	
74	1943	1943 Ripault powder factory explosion	Explosion	Monts, Indre-et-Loire	
74	1918	1918 Lothiers disaster	Train collision	Tendu, Indre	
73	1938	Nouvelles Galeries fire	Building fire	Marseille, Bouches-du-Rhône	
71	1970	Plateau d'Assy disaster	Landslide	Passy, Haute-Savoie	
69	1939	Loss of the French submarine Phénix	Submarine accident	South China Sea	
68	1973	1973 Nantes mid-air collision	Mid-air collision	Nantes, Loire-Atlantique	
63	1968	Air France Flight 212 (1968)	Plane crash	La Grande Soufrière, Guadeloupe	
62	1932	Sinking of the French submarine Prométhée	Submarine accident	Offshore of Cape Lévi, Manche	
61 (French)	2009	Air France Flight 447	Plane crash	South Atlantic Ocean	
60	1972	Air Inter Flight 696Y	Plane crash	Noirétable, Loire	
58	1950	1950 Tête de l'Obiou C-54 crash	Plane crash	Isère	
57	1970	Eurydice disaster	Submarine accident	Offshore of Saint-Tropez, Var	
57	1918	Collision between the French destroyer Catapulte and the Warrimoo	Ship collision	Mediterranean Sea off of Bizerte, Tunisia	
56	1988	Gare de Lyon rail accident	Train collision	Paris	
55	1842	Versailles rail accident	Train derailment	Meudon, Hauts-de-Seine	
54	1959	TAI Flight 307	Plane crash	Bordeaux–Mérignac Airport, Gironde	
53	1936	Saint-Chamas powder factory explosion	Explosion	Saint-Chamas, Bouches-du-Rhône	
53	1982	Beaune coach crash	Bus accident	Beaune, Côte-d’Or	
52	1968	Sinking of the French submarine Minerve	Submarine accident	Offshore of Toulon, Var	
51	2010	Cyclone Xynthia	Cyclone	Metropolitan France	
51	1950	Sinking of the weather ship Laplace	Shipwreck	Offshore of Cap Fréhel, Côtes-d'Armor	Sunk by a mine remaining from World War II, not considered an act of war.
50	1940	Flood of 1940 in France	Flood	Pyrénées-Orientales	

== 10 to 49 deaths ==
Fatalities	Year	Article	Type	Location	Comments
48	1950	Air India Flight 245	Plane crash	Mont Blanc, Haute-Savoie	
47	1992	1992 Vaison-la-Romaine flood	Flood	Vaucluse	
46-64	1954	Storm of November 26, 1954	Storm	Northern France	
46	1909	1909 Provence earthquake	Earthquake	Bouches-du-Rhône	
44	1920	Houilles train accident	Train collision	Houilles, Yvelines	
44 (French)	1998	Swissair Flight 111	Plane crash	Peggy's Cove, Canada	
43-44	1918	Loss of the French submarine Diane	Submarine accident	Offshore of La Rochelle, Charente-Maritime	
43	2015	Puisseguin road crash	Bus accident	Puisseguin, Gironde	
43	1985	Argenton-sur-Creuse train accident	Train derailment and collision	Argenton-sur-Creuse, Indre	
43	1973	1973 Rampe de Laffrey bus accident	Bus accident	Rampe de Laffrey, Isère	
43	1916	Sinking of the HMS Eden	Shipwreck	Offshore of Fécamp, Seine-Maritime	Collision with another ship
43	1928	Collision between the French submarine Ondine and the Ekarterina Goulandris	Maritime collision	Off of Cape Finisterre, Spain	
43	1891	Saint-Mandé train accident	Train collision	Saint-Mandé, Val-de-Marne	
42	1974	1974 Liévin mine disaster	Mine explosion	Liévin, Pas-de-Calais	
42	1953	Air France Flight 178	Plane crash	Mont Le Cimet, Alpes-de-Haute-Provence	
42 (French)	1979	Whiddy Island disaster	Ship explosion	Bantry Bay, Ireland	
42	1917	1917 Hersin-Coupigny dust explosion	Mine explosion	Hersin-Coupigny, Pas-de-Calais	
41	1952	Sinking of the Sibylle	Submarine accident	Offshore of Toulon, Var	
41	1872	First Sainte-Eugénie Mine disaster	Mine explosion	Montceau-les-Mines, Saône-et-Loire	
41	1913	Melun train disaster	Train collision	Melun, Seine-et-Marne	
40	1930	Fourvière disaster	Landslide	Lyon, Metropolis of Lyon	
39	1970	1970 Val-d'Isère avalanche	Avalanche	Val-d'Isère, Savoie	
39	1936	Sinking of the Pourqoui-Pas	Shipwreck	Offshore of Iceland	
39	1999	Mont Blanc Tunnel fire	Fire	Chamonix, Haute-Savoie	
39	2024	Cyclone Chido	Cyclone	Mayotte	
39	1921	Les Échets train accident	Train derailment	Les Échets, Miribel, Ain	
38	1910	Saujon train accident	Train collision	Saujon, Charente-Maritime	
38	1971	Sinking of the MS Maori	Shipwreck	Bay of Biscay	
38	1952	1952 Air France SNCASE Languedoc crash	Plane crash	Nice Airport, Alpes-Maritimes	
38	1749	1749 Huez avalanche	Avalanche	Huez, Isère	
37	1934	1934 Ortiporio avalanche	Avalanche	Ortiporio, Corsica	
37	1933	Saint-Élier train accident	Train derailment	La Croisille, Eure	
37	1924	Sinking of the Port de Brest	Shipwreck	Atlantic Ocean off of the Canary Islands	
36	1962	Cyclone Jenny	Cyclone	Réunion	
36	1972	Morhange talc affair	Health disaster	Metropolitan France	
35	1999	1999 Aude flood	Flood	Aude	
35	1985	Flaujac train accident	Train collision	Durbans, Lot	
34 (French)	1947	Texas City disaster	Ship explosion	Texas City, United States	
34	1961	1961 Derby Aviation crash	Plane crash	Canigó, Pyrénées-Orientales	
34	1920	1920 Paris plague epidemic	Epidemic	Paris	
34	1956	Linee Aeree Italiane Flight 451 (1956)	Plane crash	Paray-Vieille-Poste, Essonne	
33	1883	1883 Saint-Méen train collision	Train collision	Saint-Méen-le-Grand, Ille-et-Vilaine	
33	1940	Aurillac-Paris train derailment	Train derailment	Allier	
32	1757	1757 Vallouise avalanche	Avalanche	Vallouise, Hautes-Alpes	
32	1941	Sinking of the Schooner Tereora	Shipwreck	Between Papeete and Raiatea, French Polynesia	
32	1891	Sinking of the Persévérance	Shipwreck	Between Brazil and Chile	
32	1922	Villecomtal train accident	Train collision	Laguian-Mazous, Gers	
32	1917	Sinking of the Tugboat Atlas	Shipwreck	Offshore of Brest, Finistère	
31	2001	Toulouse chemical factory explosion	Explosion	Toulouse, Haute-Garonne	
30	1830	Second Saint-Louis Coal Mine Disaster	Mine explosion	Saint-Louis Coal Mine, Haute-Saône	
30	1999	Cyclone Martin (1999)	Cyclone	Southwestern France	
~30	1660	1660 Bigorre earthquake	Earthquake	Hautes-Pyrénées	
29	1855	Second Ravez Mine disaster	Mine explosion	Montceau-les-Mines, Saône-et-Loire	
29	1975	1975 Rampe de Laffrey bus accident	Bus accident	Rampe de Laffrey, Isère	
29	1937	Villeneuve-Saint-Georges train accident	Train derailment	Villeneuve-Saint-Georges, Seine-et-Oise	
29	1921	Beaucourt-Hamel train accident	Train derailment	Somme	
29	1859	First Saint-Joseph Coal Mine Disaster	Mine explosion	Saint-Joseph Coal Mine, Ronchamp, Haute-Saône	
28	1895	Second Sainte-Eugénie Mine disaster	Mine explosion	Montceau-les-Mines, Saône-et-Loire	
28	1921	Batignolles tunnel disaster	Train collision	Paris	
28	1918	Pacy tunnel disaster	Train collision	Pacy-sur-Armançon, Yonne	
28	1885	1885 Liévin disaster	Mine explosion	Liévin, Pas-de-Calais	
28	1939	Izourt Dam avalanche	Avalanche	Auzat, Ariège	
27	1979	Collision between the Emmanuel Delmas and the Vera-Berlingieri	Ship collision and fire	Tyrrhenian Sea	
27	1907	Ponts-de-Cé train accident	Train derailment	Les Ponts-de-Cé, Maine-et-Loire	
27	1957	1957 Saint-Paul bus accident	Bus accident	Saint-Paul, Réunion	
27	1910	Collision between the French submarine Pluviôse and the Pas-de-Calais	Maritime collision	English Channel	
27	1901	Sinking of the Charlemagne	Shipwreck	South Atlantic	
26	2007	2007 Rampe de Laffrey bus accident	Bus accident	Rampe de Laffrey, Isère	
26	1939	Sinking of the Cabourg	Shipwreck	English Channel	
26	1947	Ocean Liberty disaster	Ship explosion	Brest, Finistère	
25	2010	2010 Var floods	Flood	Var	
25	1976	Sinking of the Böhlen	Shipwreck	Offshore of Île de Sein, Finistère	
25	1980	Cyclone Hyacinthe	Cyclone	Réunion	
25	1898	Sinking of the Maréchal Lannes	Shipwreck	Off of Bristol, England	
24	1902	Arleux disaster	Train derailment	Arleux, Nord	
24	1918	Solers train accident	Train collision	Solers, Seine-et-Marne	
24	2001	2001 Gard flood	Flood	Gard	
24	2005	Paris-Opéra Hotel fire	Building fire	Paris	
23	1987	1987 Grand-Bornand flood	Flood	Grand-Bornand, Haute-Savoie	
23	1951	Sinking of the Duc de Normandie	Shipwreck	Offshore of Fécamp, Seine-Maritime	
23	1988	TAT Flight 230	Plane crash	Fontainebleau, Seine-et-Marne	
23	1910	Villepreux-Les Clayes rail accident	Train collision	Les Clayes-sous-Bois, Yvelines	
23	1886	Third Saint-Charles Coal Mine Disaster	Mine explosion	Ronchamp, Haute-Saône	
22	1985	Simon Pits disaster	Mine disaster	Forbach, Moselle	
22	1881	Charenton train collision	Train collision	Charenton-le-Pont, Val-de-Marne	
22	1989	Uni-Air International Flight 602	Plane crash	Léoncel, Drôme	
22	2015	2015 Alpes-Maritimes floods	Flood	Alpes-Maritimes	
22	1823	1823 Fosse du Chaufour explosion	Mine explosion	Raismes, Nord	
21	1962	Malév Flight 355	Plane crash	Roissy-en-France, Val d'Oise	
21	1990	Burns' Day Storm	Storm	Metropolitan France	
21	1788	1788 Molines-en-Queyras avalanche	Avalanche	Molines-en-Queyras, Hautes-Alpes	
21	1965	1965 Liévin mines disaster	Mine explosion	Avion, Pas-de-Calais	
21	1946	Sinking of U-2326	Submarine accident	Off of Toulon, Var	German submarine transferred to the French after the war, sunk with all hands on board.
21	1961	Clamart and Issy-les-Moulineaux quarries collapse	Underground quarry collapse	Clamart and Issy-les-Moulineaux, Hauts-de-Seine	
21	1900	1900 Aniche disaster	Mine accident	Aniche, Nord	
20	1999	Saint-Étienne-en-Dévoluy cable car crash	Cable car crash	Saint-Étienne-en-Dévoluy, Hautes-Alpes	
20	1973	Collège Édouard-Pailleron fire	Arson	Paris	
20	1964	Lefebvre Boulevard disaster	Building collapse	Paris	
20	2007	Air Moorea Flight 1121	Plane crash	Moʻorea, French Polynesia	
20	1919	1919 Montauban-Toulouse train collision	Train collision	Haute-Garonne	
20	1919	1919 Pont-sur-Yonne train disaster	Train collision	Pont-sur-Yonne, Yonne	
20	1958	Plichon Mine disaster	Mine explosion	Montceau-les-Mines, Saône-et-Loire	
20	1919	1919 Crissé train collision	Train collision	Crissé, Sarthe	
20	1918	1918 Meung-sur-Loire train disaster	Train collision	Meung-sur-Loire, Loiret	
20	1871	1871 Puteaux train disaster	Train collision	Puteaux, Hauts-de-Seine	
20	1844	Sète tornado	Tornado	Hérault	
20	2001	Air Caraïbes Flight 1501	Plane crash	Col de la Tourmente, Saint Barthélemy	
20	1600	1600 Gedre avalanche	Avalanche	Gèdre, Hautes-Pyrenees	
20	1955	1955 Vannes and Brest smallpox epidemic	Epidemic	Finistère and Morbihan	
20	1824	1824 Saint-Louis coal mine disaster	Mine explosion	Champagney, Haute-Saône	
20	1824	1824 Fosse du Chaufour explosion	Mine explosion	Raismes, Nord	
19	1925	1925 Saint-Antoine-du-Rocher derailment	Train derailment	Saint-Antoine-du-Rocher, Indre-et-Loire	
19	1869	1869 Bully-les-Mines fire	Mine fire	Bully-les-Mines, Pas-de-Calais	
19	1949	Sinking of the Côte d'Opale	Shipwreck	Off of Norway	
18	1992	Stade Armand-Cesari disaster	Stadium collapse	Bastia, Corsica	
18	1946	1946 Rampe de Laffrey accident	Bus accident	Rampe de Laffrey, Isère	
18	1926	Achères disaster	Train derailment	Achères, Yvelines	
18	1966	Feyzin disaster	Industrial fire	Feyzin, Metropolis of Lyon	
18	1920	1920 Lyon-Paris train collision	Train collision	Dijon, Côte-d'Or	
17	1899	Juvisy-sur-Orge train accident	Train collision	Juvisy-sur-Orge, Essonne	
17	1936	Sinking of the Marinette et Margot	Shipwreck	Sole Bank, Atlantic Ocean	
17	1914	1914 Bricquebec train collision	Train collision	Bricquebec, Manche	
17	1913	1913 Cagnes-Grasse derailment	Train derailment	Grasse, Alpes-Maritimes	
17	2005	Boulevard Vincent-Auriol fire	Building fire	Paris	
17	1920	Fosse de Rœulx elevator disaster	Mine accident	Escaudain, Nord	
17	1985	Saint-Pierre-du-Vauvray accident	Level crossing disaster	Saint-Pierre-du-Vauvray, Eure	
17	1956	Sinking of the Vert Prairial	Shipwreck	Offshore of Cornwall, England	
17	1884	1884 Ferfay disaster	Mine explosion	Ferfay, Pas-de-Calais	
17	1904	1904 Mamers flood	Flood	Mamers, Sarthe	
16+	1918	Ségrie rail disaster	Train collision	Ségrie, Sarthe	
16 (French)	1986	Sinking of the Snekkar Arctic	Shipwreck	North Sea near Scotland	18 killed in total.
16	1952	Sinking of the All Right	Shipwreck	Offshore of Finistère	
16	1879	Magny Coal Mine explosion	Mine explosion	Magny-Danigon, Haute-Saône	
16	1987	Air Littoral Flight 1919	Plane crash	near Eysines, Gironde	
16	1991	1991 Melun train disaster	Train collision	Melun, Seine-et-Marne	
16	1968	1968 Sainte-Marie Douglas DC-6 crash	Plane crash	Sainte-Marie, Réunion	
16	1906	Lutin disaster	Submarine accident	Bizerte Lake, Tunisia	
16	1855	1855 Lyon-Paris Express derailment	Train derailment	Seine-et-Marne	
16	1866	Franois rail disaster	Train collision	Doubs	
16	1970	1970 Courrières mines explosion	Mine explosion	Fouquières-lès-Lens, Pas-de-Calais	
16	1880	Clichy-Levallois train collision	Train collision	Clichy, Hauts-de-Seine	
16	1948	1948 Sallaumines mine explosion	Mine explosion	Sallaumines, Pas-de-Calais	
16	1950	Sinking of the Gay-Lussac	Shipwreck	Irish Sea	
16	1943	1943 Annequin mine explosion	Mine explosion	Annequin, Pas-de-Calais	
15	1908	Pouch Tunnel Rail Disaster	Train collision	Voutezac, Corrèze	
15	1962	Sinking of the Ravenel	Shipwreck	Offshore of Saint Pierre and Miquelon	
15	1998	Proteus Airlines Flight 706	Mid-air collision	Quiberon Bay, Morbihan	
15	1919	Sinking of the USS Gypsum Queen	Shipwreck	near Ar Men Lighthouse, Finistère	
15	1918	Mont-Dore-Paris mail train derailment	Train derailment	Loir-et-Cher	
15	1881	1881 Lourches mine disaster	Mine explosion	Lourches, Nord	
15	1982	Storm of November 6–8, 1982	Storm	Metropolitan France	
15	2018	October 2018 floods in Aude	Flood	Aude	
15	1919	1919 Mauvages train disaster	Train collision	Mauvages, Meuse	
14	1904	1904 La Chapelle train collision	Train collision	Paris	
14	1870	Critot train disaster	Derailment	Critot, Seine-Maritime	
14	1916	1916 Saint-Denis train disaster	Train explosion	Saint-Denis, Seine-Saint-Denis	
14	1917	1917 Massy-Palaiseau derailment	Train derailment	Massy, Essonne	
14	1905	Farfadet disaster	Submarine accident	Bizerte Lake, Tunisia	
14	1922	Châtelaudren train collision	Train collision	Châtelaudren, Côtes-d'Armor	
14	1953	Sinking of the Kanaouen ar Mor II	Shipwreck	Celtic Sea	
14	1900	1900 Landes Sud Express disaster	Train derailment	Landes	
14	2016	Rouen bar fire	Building fire	Rouen, Seine-Maritime	
14	1911	Montreuil-Bellay train accident	Bridge collapse	Maine-et-Loire	
14	1897	Capvern train collision	Train collision	Capvern, Hautes-Pyrénées	
14	1846	Fampoux rail accident	Train derailment	Fampoux, Pas-de-Calais	
14	1918	La Courneuve disaster	Explosion	La Courneuve, Seine-Saint-Denis	
13	1997	Port-Sainte-Foy accident	Level crossing disaster	Port-Sainte-Foy-et-Ponchapt, Dordogne	
13	1946	1946 Ostricourt Mines disaster	Mine explosion	Oignies, Pas-de-Calais	
13	1853	Second Cinq Sous Mine Disaster	Mine explosion	Montceau-les-Mines, Saône-et-Loire	
13	1911	Courville train accident	Train collision	Courville, Eure-et-Loir	
13	2019	2019 Ménaka mid-air collision	Mid-air collision	Ménaka, Mali	
13	1923	1923 Mareuil-le-Port train collision	Train collision	Mareuil-le-Port, Marne	
13	1954	Sinking of the Tendre Berceuse	Shipwreck	Irish Sea	
13	1917	1917 Châteauneuf-sur-Cher train collision	Train collision	Châteauneuf-sur-Cher, Cher	
13	1879	1879 Fleurs train disaster	Train collision	Orne	
13	1876	1876 Fosse Soyez mine disaster	Mine accident	Roost-Warendin, Nord	
13	1922	Rouffach train collision	Train collision	Rouffach, Haut-Rhin	
12	1917	1917 Valmanya avalanche	Avalanche	Valmanya, Pyrénées-Orientales	
12	1925	1925 Amiens train derailment	Train derailment	Amiens, Somme	
12	1909	1909 Saulx-les-Chartreux train collision	Train collision	Saulx-les-Chartreux, Île-de-France	
12	1931	Saint-Denis-de-Pile bridge collapse	Bridge collapse	Saint-Denis-de-Pile, Gironde	
12	1906	Épernon train accident	Train collision	Épernon, Eure-et-Loir	
12	1962	Sinking of the Trawler Jeanne-Gougy	Shipwreck	Off of Land's End, England	
12	1763	1763 Prats-de-Mollo earthquake	Earthquake	Prats-de-Mollo-la-Preste, Pyrénées-Orientales	
12	1962	Sinking of Le Kador	Shipwreck	Offshore of Camaret-sur-Mer, Finistère	
12	1910	Bernay train accident	Train derailment	Bernay, Eure	
12	1951	Sinking of the Trawler Ginette Le Borgne	Shipwreck	Offshore of Cape Race, Canada	
12	1907	Coutras train accident	Train collision	Gironde	
12	1879	Xeuilley train disaster	Carbon monoxide poisoning	Xeuilley, Meurthe-et-Moselle	
12	1952	1952 Frugerès-les-Mines disaster	Mine disaster	Frugerès-les-Mines, Haute-Loire	
12	1919	1919 Douai train disaster	Train collision	Douai, Nord	
11	2015	Eckwersheim derailment	Train derailment	Eckwersheim, Bas-Rhin	
11	1988	1988 Nîmes flood	Flood	Nîmes, Gard	
11	2020	Storm Alex	Cyclone	Metropolitan France	
11	1951	1951 Bruay-en-Artois mine explosion	Mine explosion	Bruay-la-Buissière, Pas-de-Calais	
11	1917	Paul Tourreil disasters	Shipwreck	Off of Île d'Yeu, Vendée	
11	1895	1895 Saint-Brandan train disaster	Train derailment	Saint-Brandan, Côtes d'Armor	
11	1979	1979 Nice tsunami	Tsunami	Nice, Alpes-Maritimes	
11	1799	Fosse du Gros Caillou explosion	Mine explosion	Vieux-Condé, Nord	
11	1920	1920 La Rochelle disaster	Explosion	La Rochelle, Charente-Maritime	
11	1989	Hurricane Hugo	Hurricane	Guadeloupe	
11	2017	Hurricane Irma	Hurricane	Saint Martin and Saint Barthélemy	
11	1990	Joigny coach crash	Bus accident	Joigny, Yonne	
11	1920	1920 Armentières train collision	Train collision	Armentières, Nord	
11	1854	1854 Aniche disaster	Mine explosion and landslide	Aniche, Nord	
11	1871	1871 Saint-Sornin train disaster	Train derailment	Saint-Sornin, Allier	
11	1871	1871 Champigny derailment	Train derailment	Champigny, Yonne	
11	2023	Wintzenheim lodge fire	Building fire	Wintzenheim, Haut-Rhin	
11	1869	1869 Fosse Notre-Dame disaster	Mine accident	Waziers, Nord	
11	1912	1912 Gare du Nord train disaster	Train collision	Paris	
11	1958	1958 Drocourt Mines disaster	Mine accident	Méricourt, Pas-de-Calais	
11	1805	Fosse Saint-Roch mine fire	Mine fire	Vieux-Condé, Nord	
10	1954	1954 La Clarence mines disaster	Mine explosion	Divion, Pas-de-Calais	
10	2008	2008 French measles outbreak	Disease outbreak	Metropolitan France	
10	1947	Sinking of the Chalutier Rosier Fleuri	Shipwreck	Guilvinec, Finistère	
10	1978	Sinking of the Alcyon	Shipwreck	Offshore of Cornwall, England	
10 (French)	2015	April 2015 Nepal earthquake	Earthquake	Nepal	
10	1853	First Ravez Mine disaster	Mine explosion	Montceau-les-Mines, Saône-et-Loire	
10	1991	Air Tahiti Flight 805	Plane crash	Nuku Hiva, French Polynesia	
10	2022	Vaulx-en-Velin fire	Building fire	Vaulx-en-Velin, Metropolis of Lyon	
10	1908	Grisolles train disaster	Train collision	Grisolles, Tarn-et-Garonne	
10	1962	Sinking of Le Moros	Shipwreck	Irish Sea	
10	2019	February 2019 Paris fire	Building fire	Paris	
10	1931	Étampes train accident	Train derailment	Étampes, Essonne	
10	1957	1957 Lens Mines explosion	Mine explosion	Liévin, Pas-de-Calais	
10	1955	Sinking of the Galant Passeur	Shipwreck	Celtic Sea	
10	1921	1921 Feurs train disaster	Train collision	Feurs, Loire	
10	1968	Sinking of the Où Vas-Tu	Shipwreck	Irish Sea	
10	1972	Sinking of the Cité d'Aleth	Shipwreck	Irish Sea	
10	1885	1885 Courcelles-les-Lens mine disaster	Mine explosion	Courcelles-les-Lens, Pas-de-Calais Department	

== Gallery ==
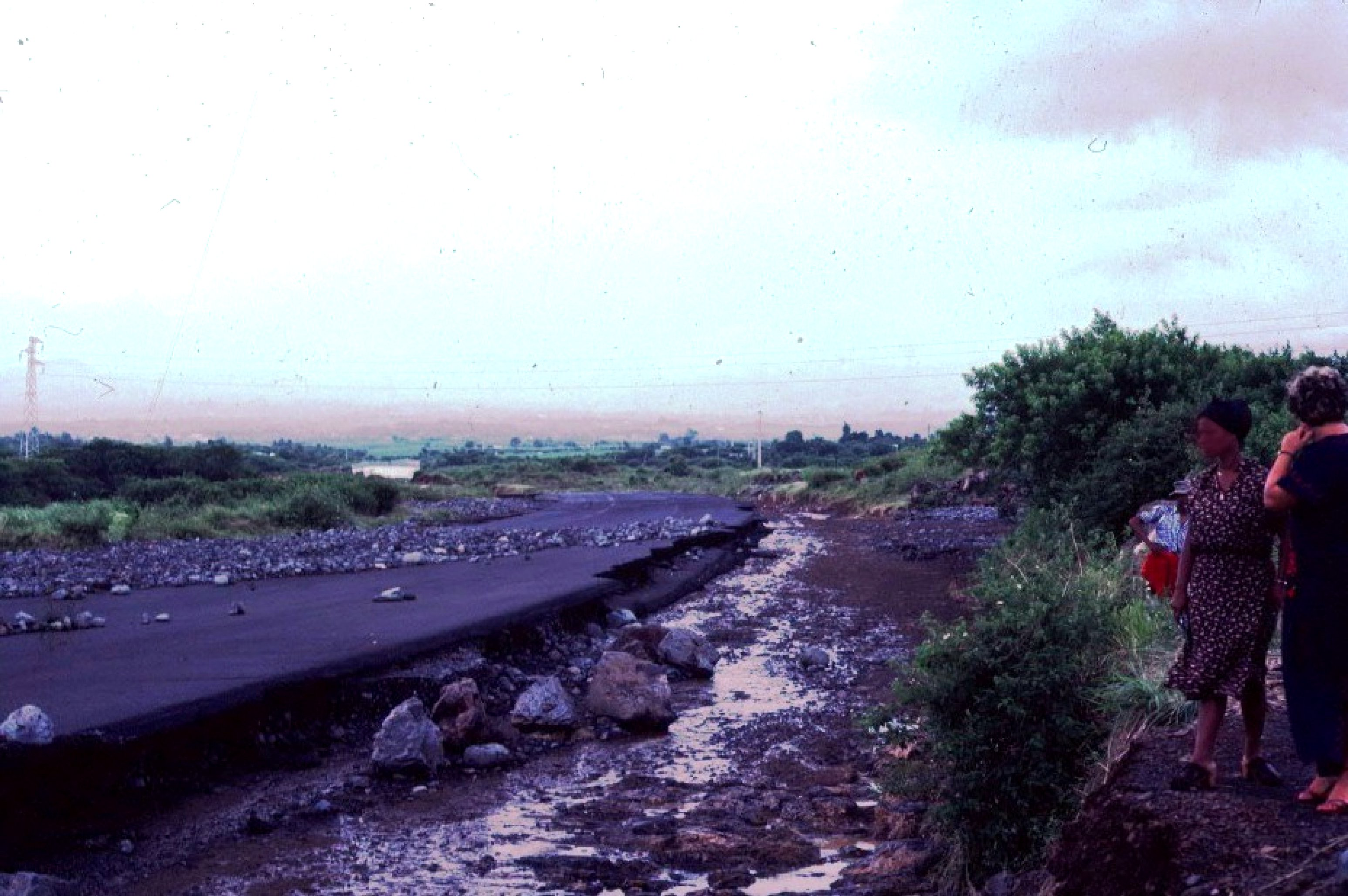
Cyclone Hyacinthe

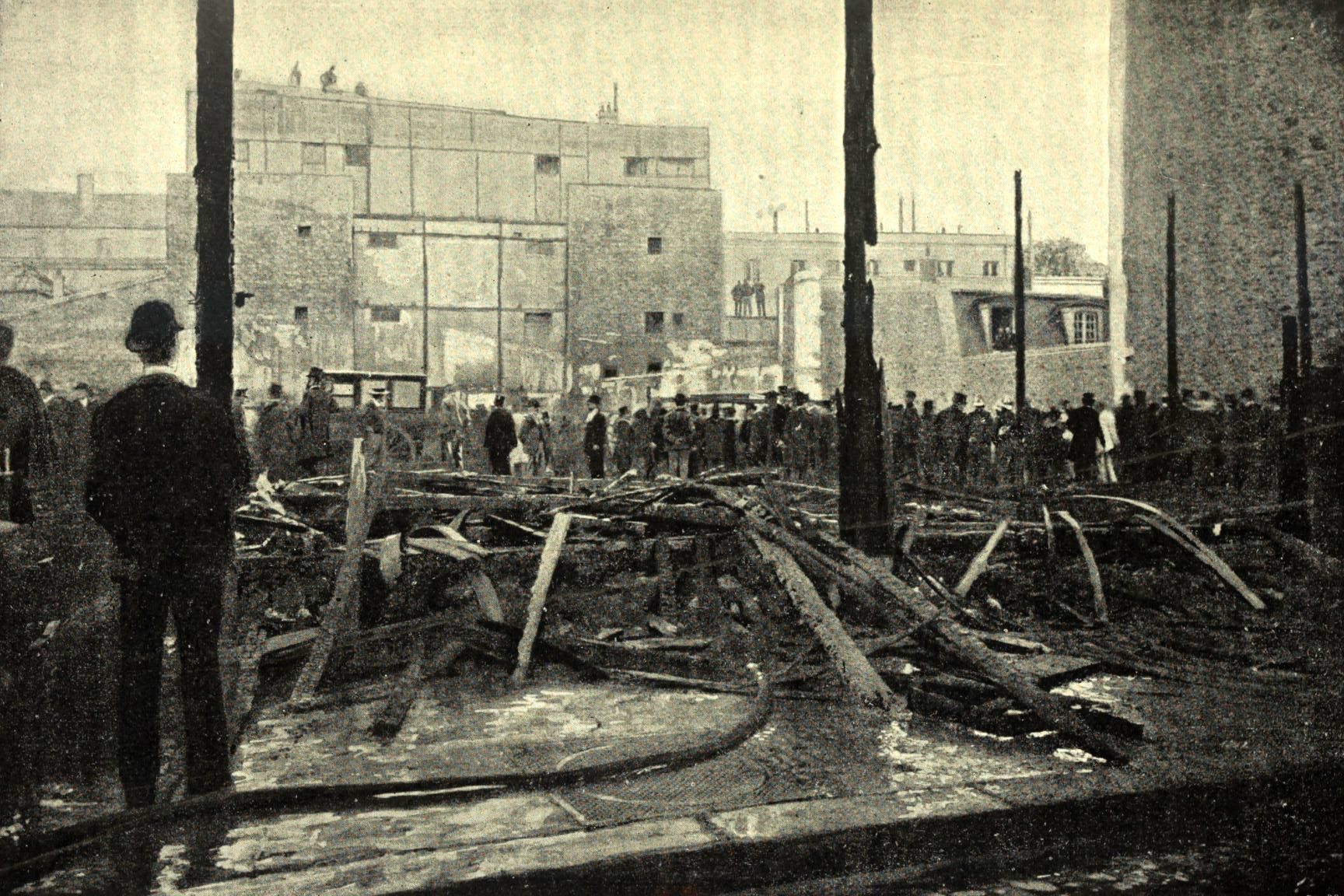
1897 Bazar de la Charité

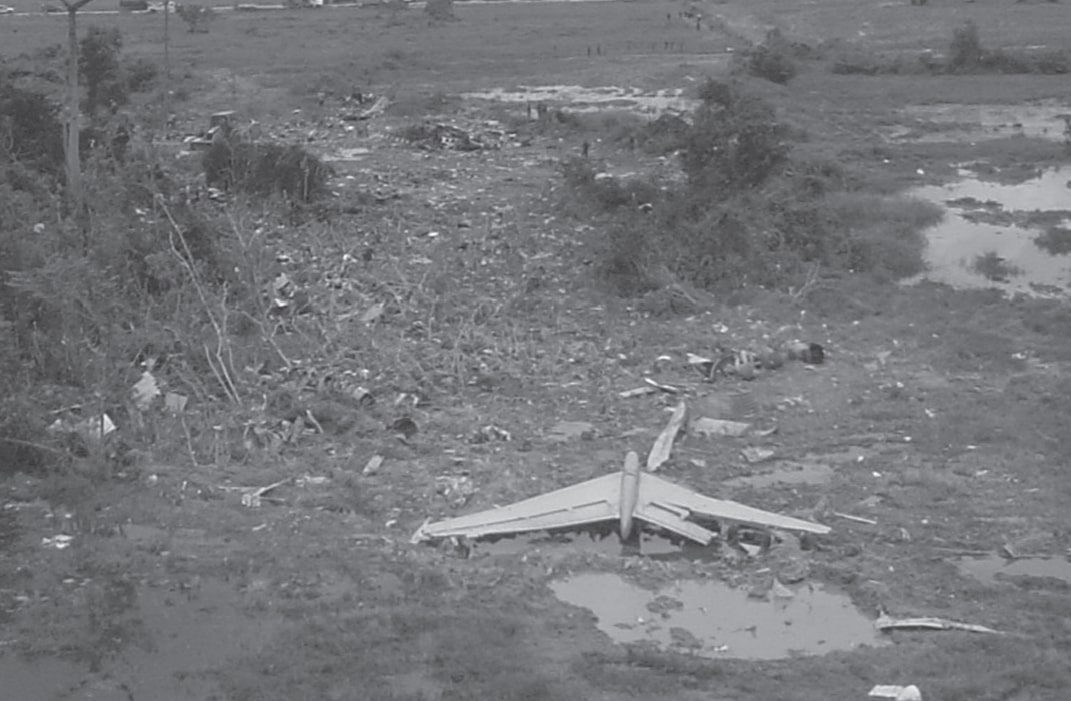
West Caribbean Airways Flight 708

Saint-Michel-de-Maurienne derailment

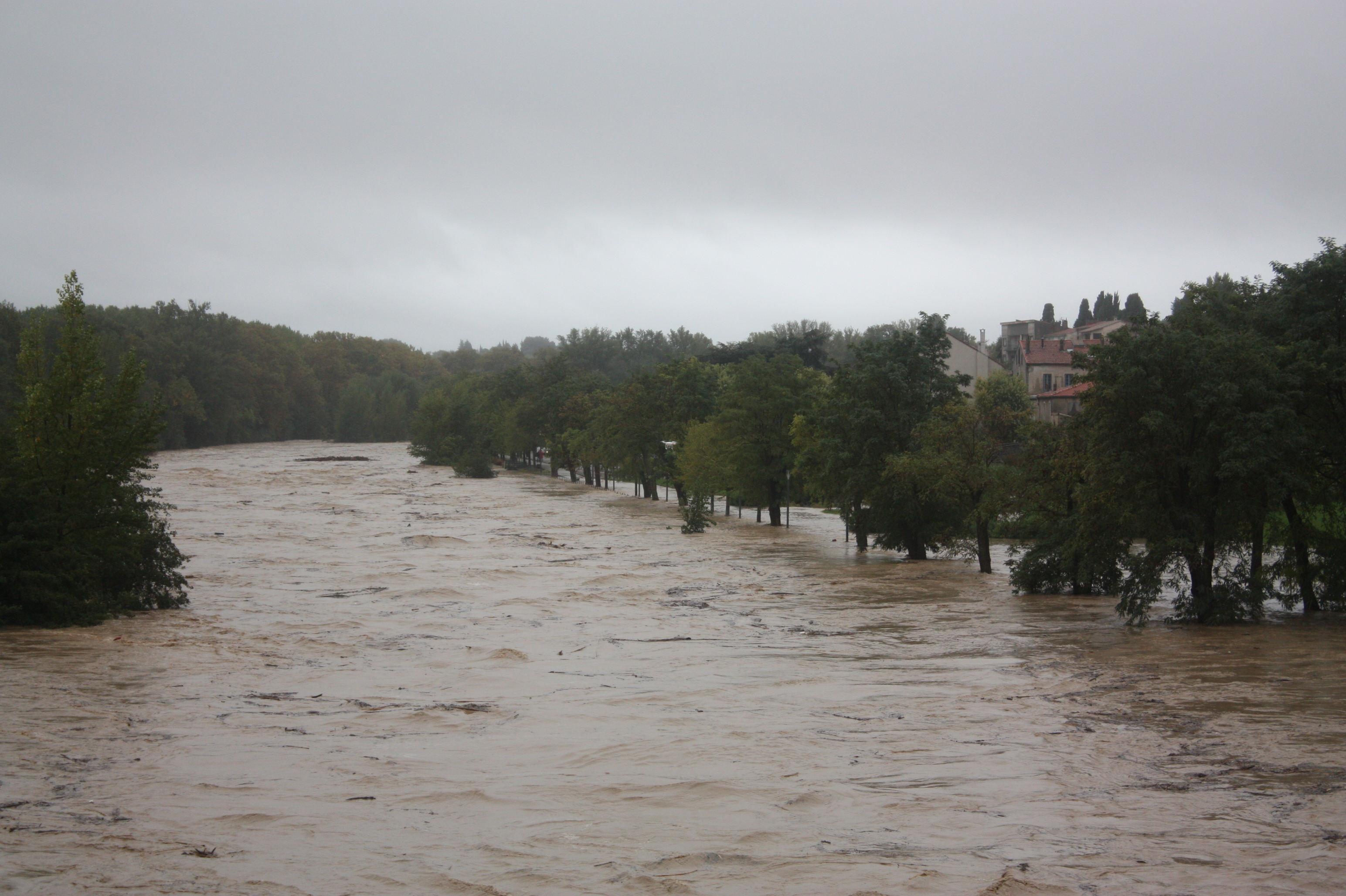
October 2018 Aude floods

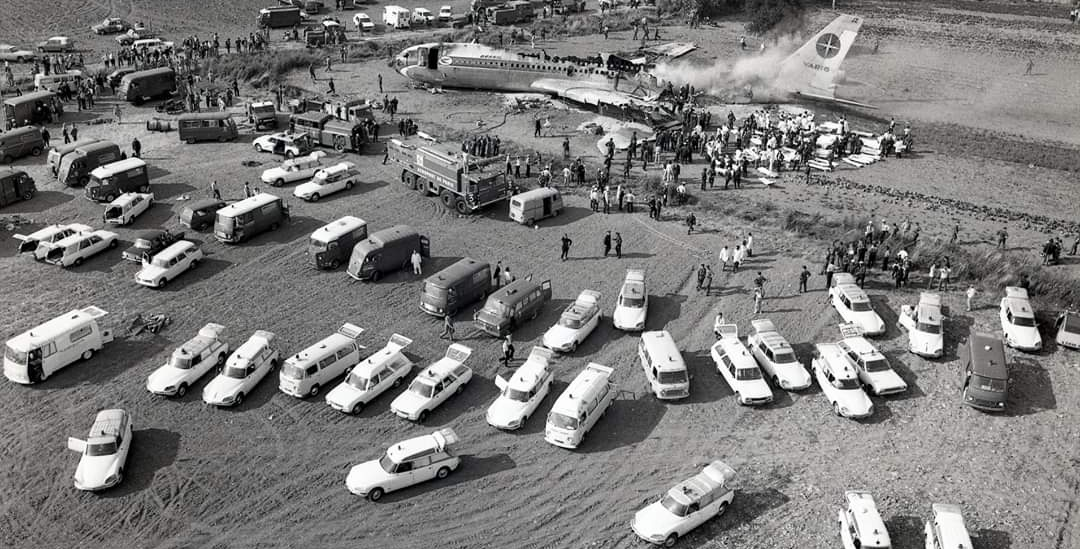
Varig Flight 820

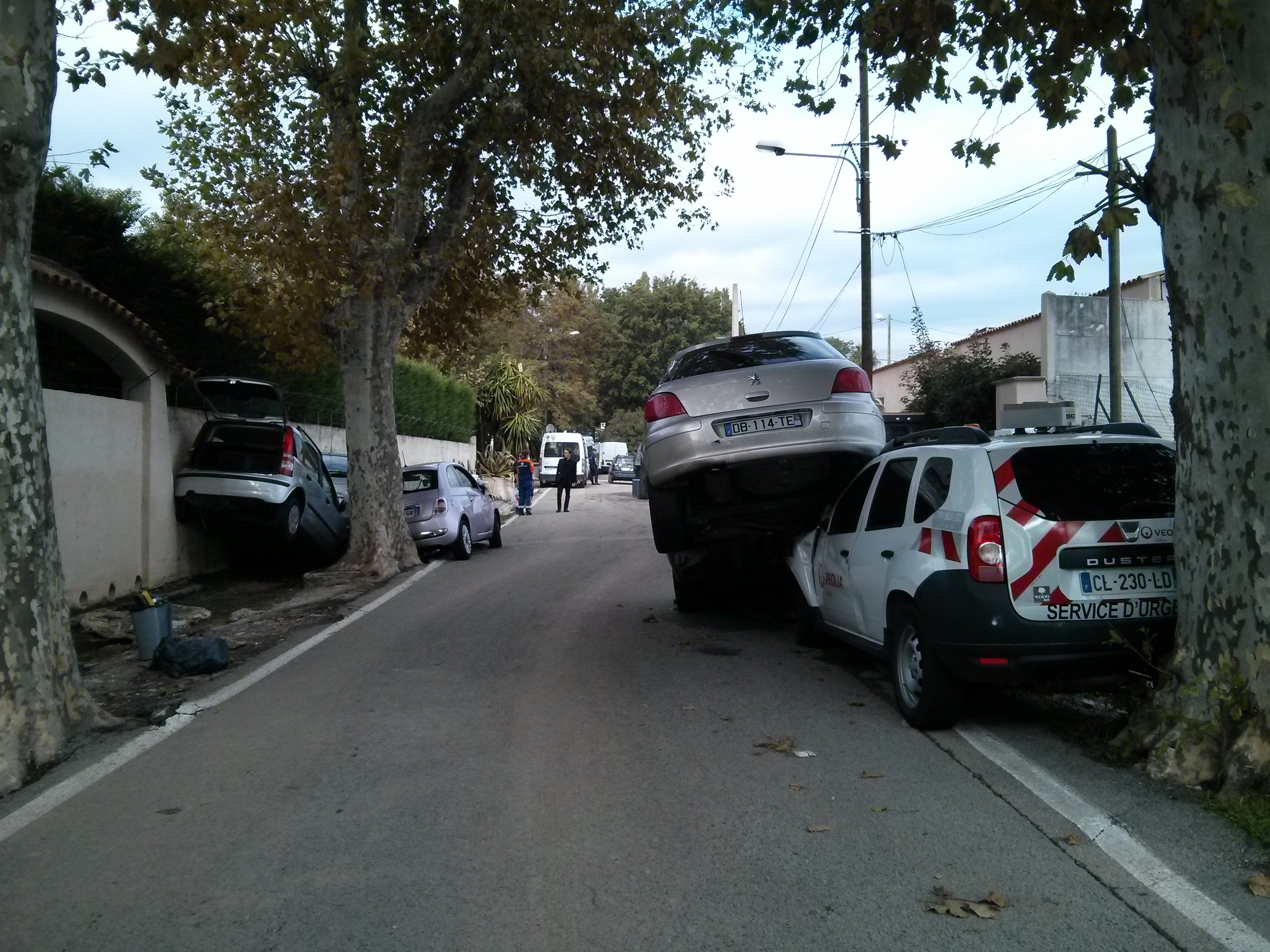
2015 Alpes-Maritimes floods

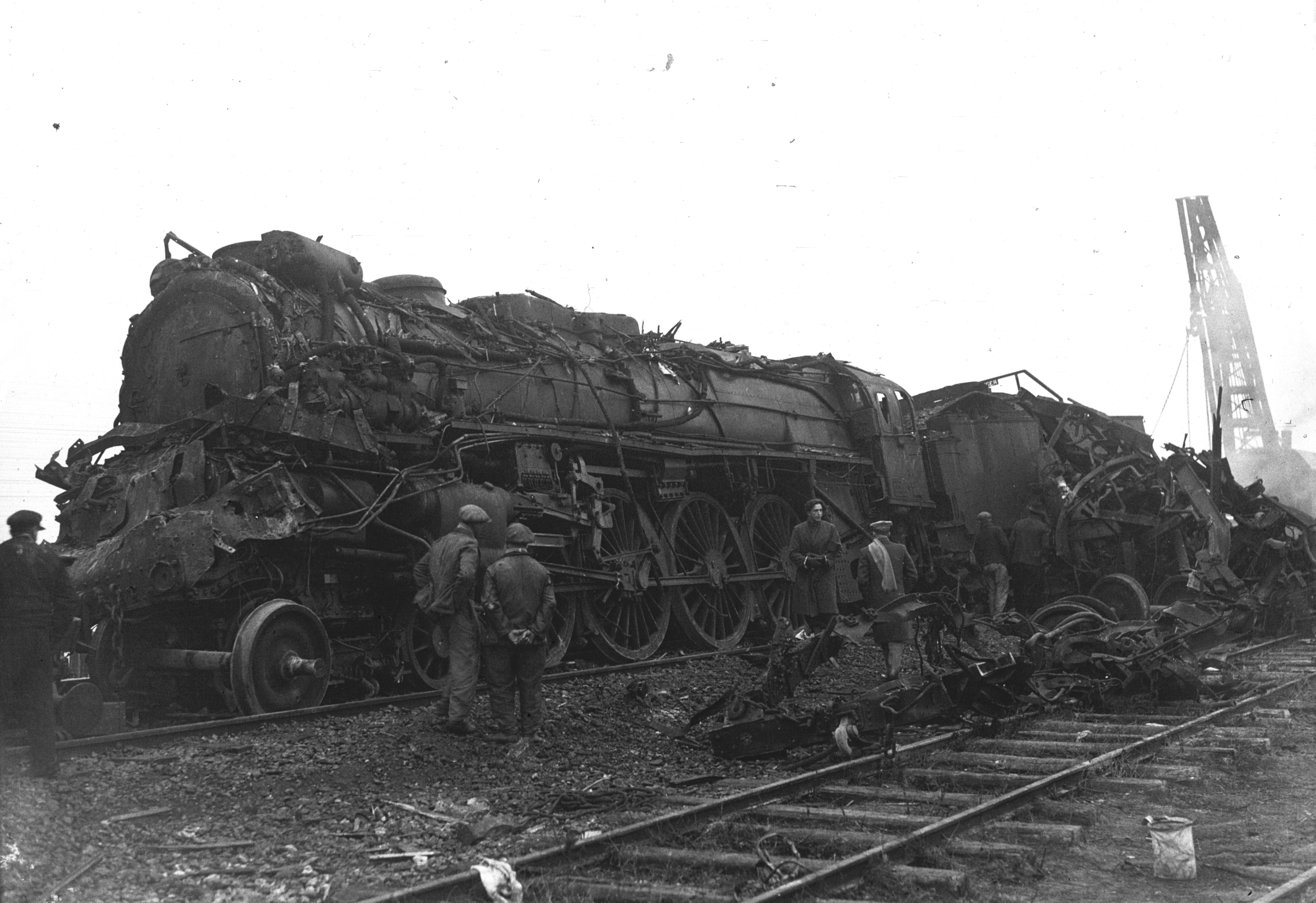
Lagny-Pomponne rail accident

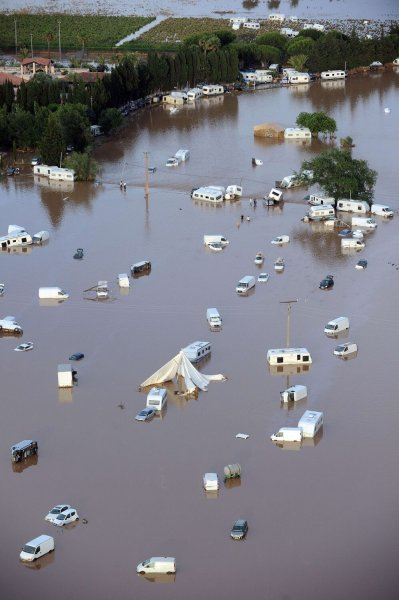
2010 Var floods

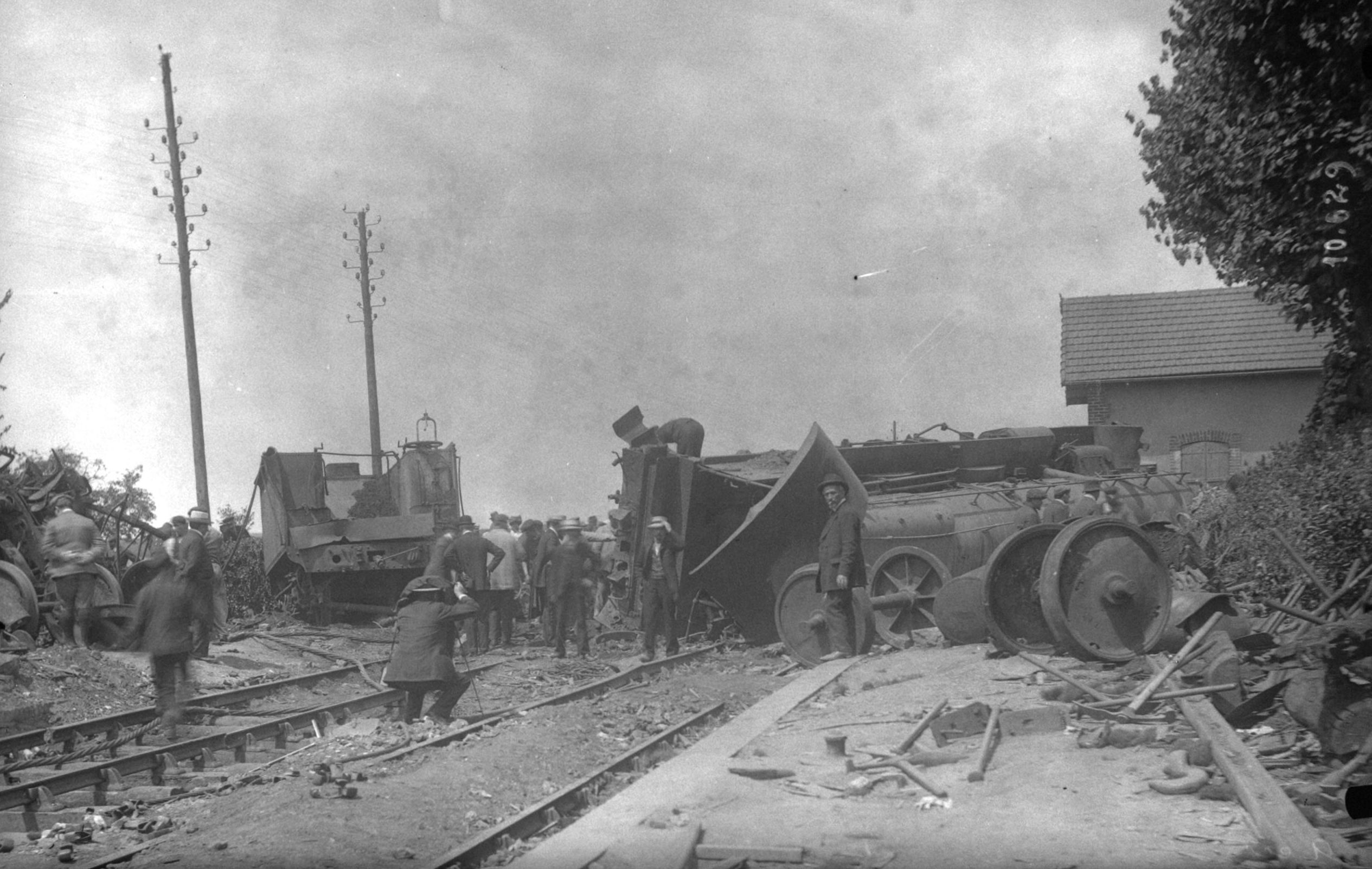
Villepreux-Les Clayes rail accident

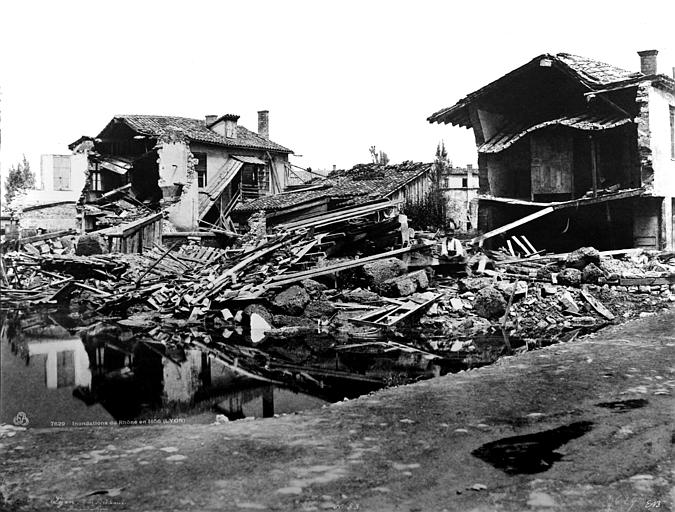
Flood of 1856

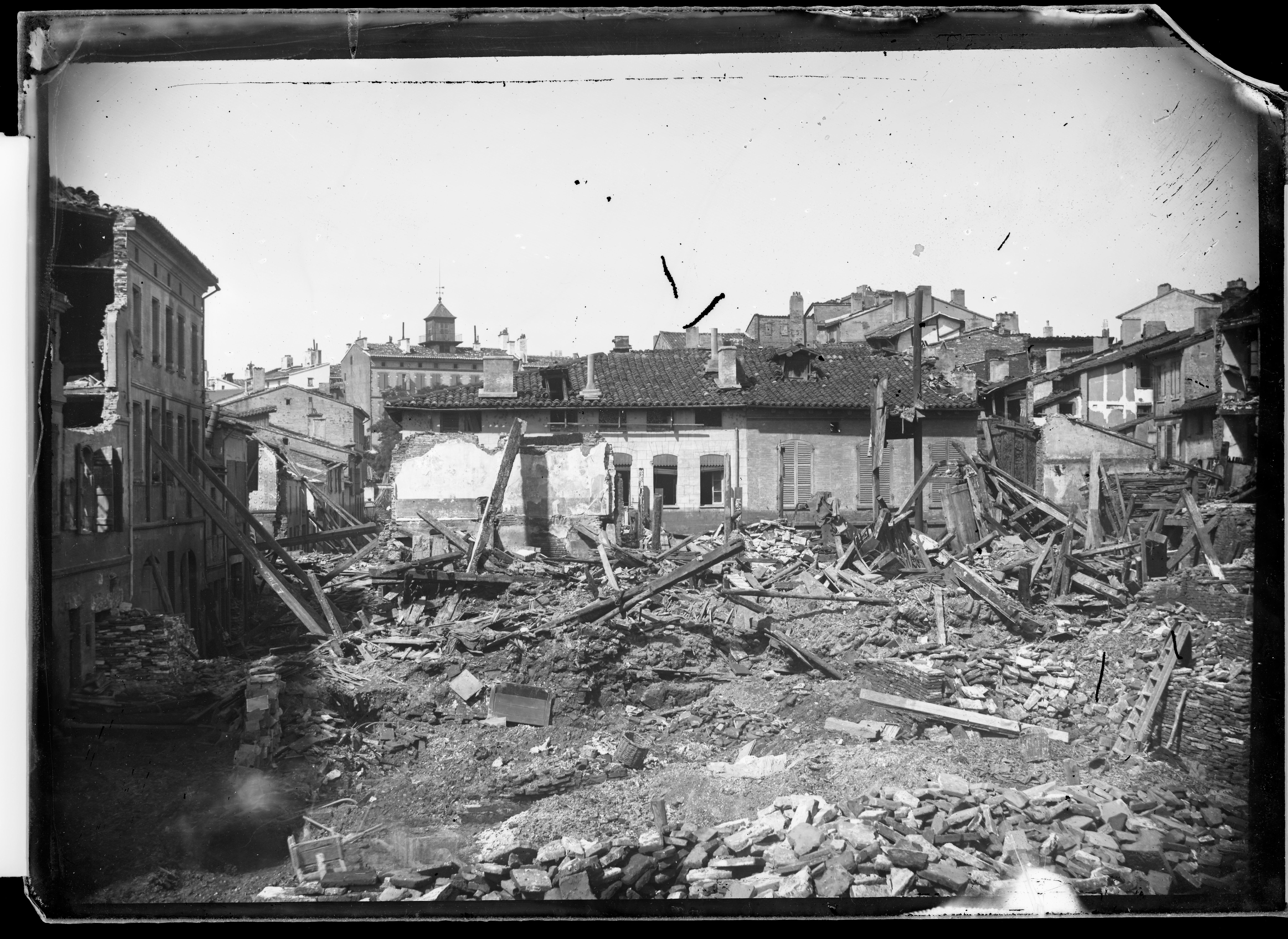
1875 Garonne flood

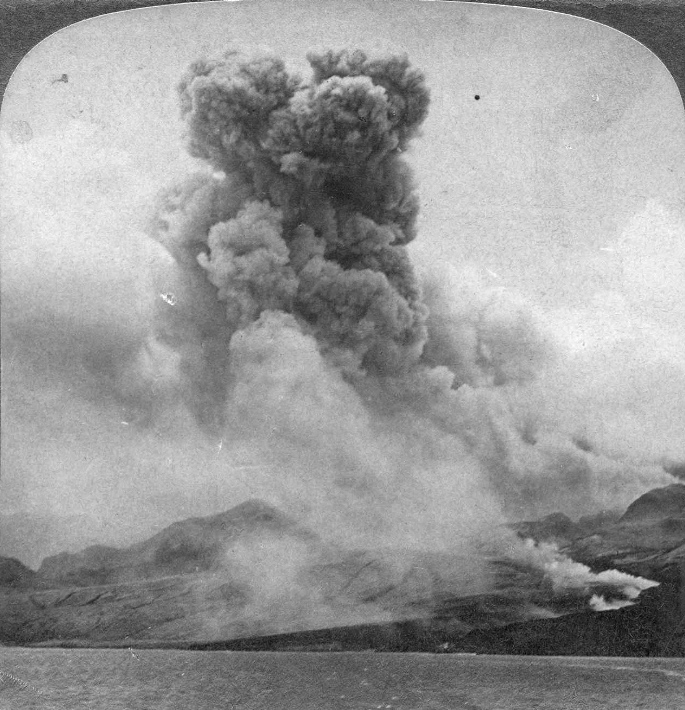
1902 eruption of Mount Pelée

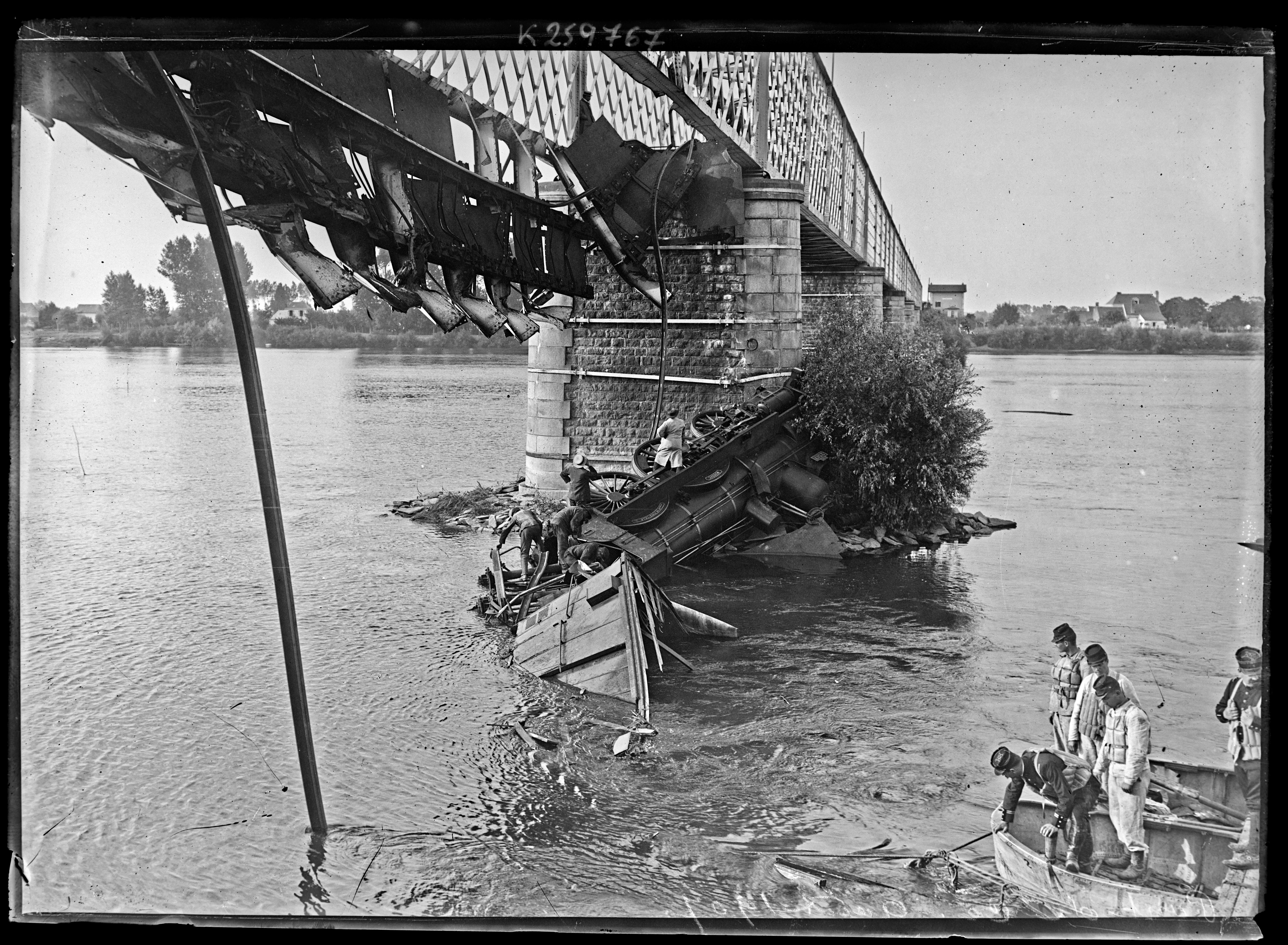
Ponts-de-Cé train accident

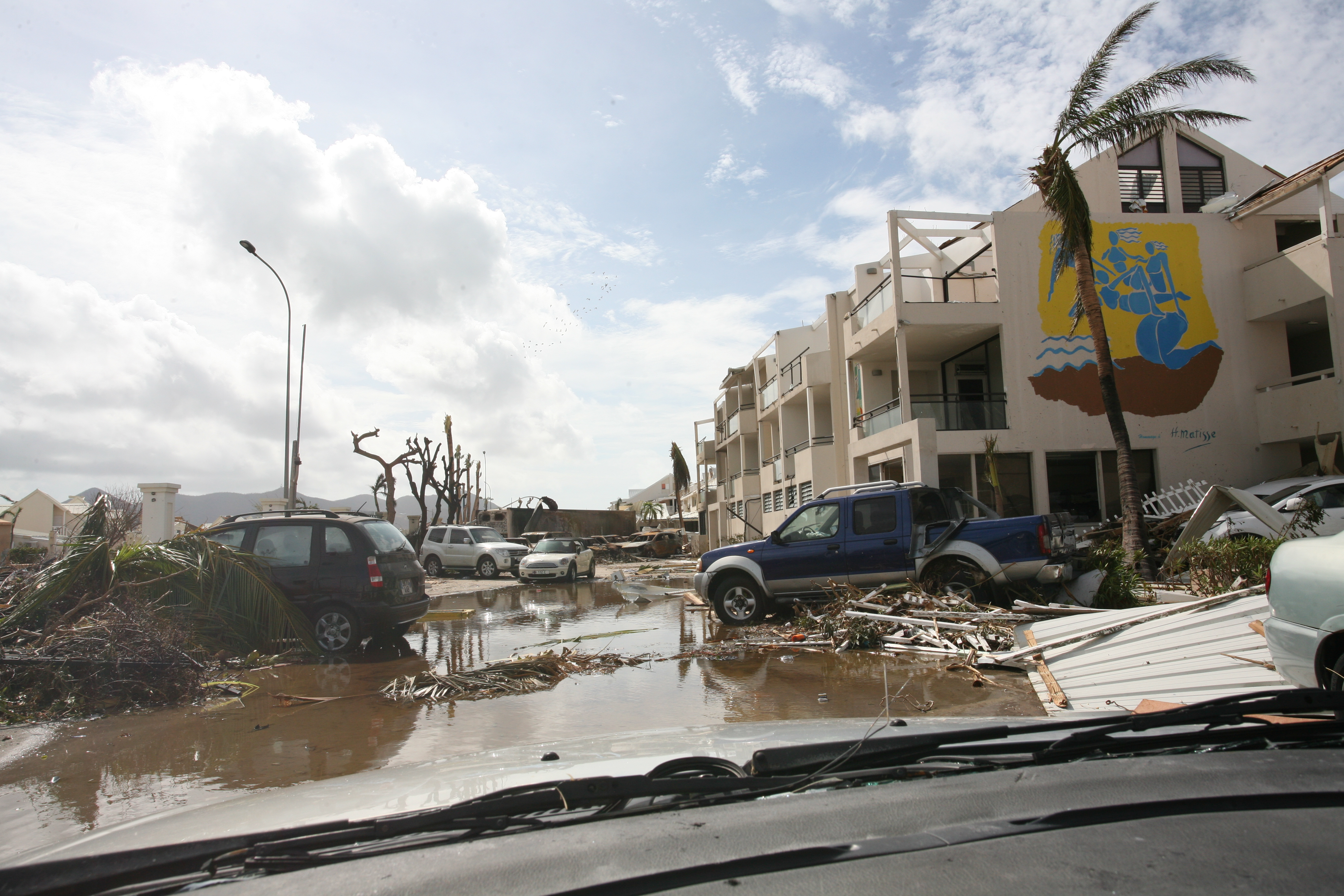
Hurricane Irma

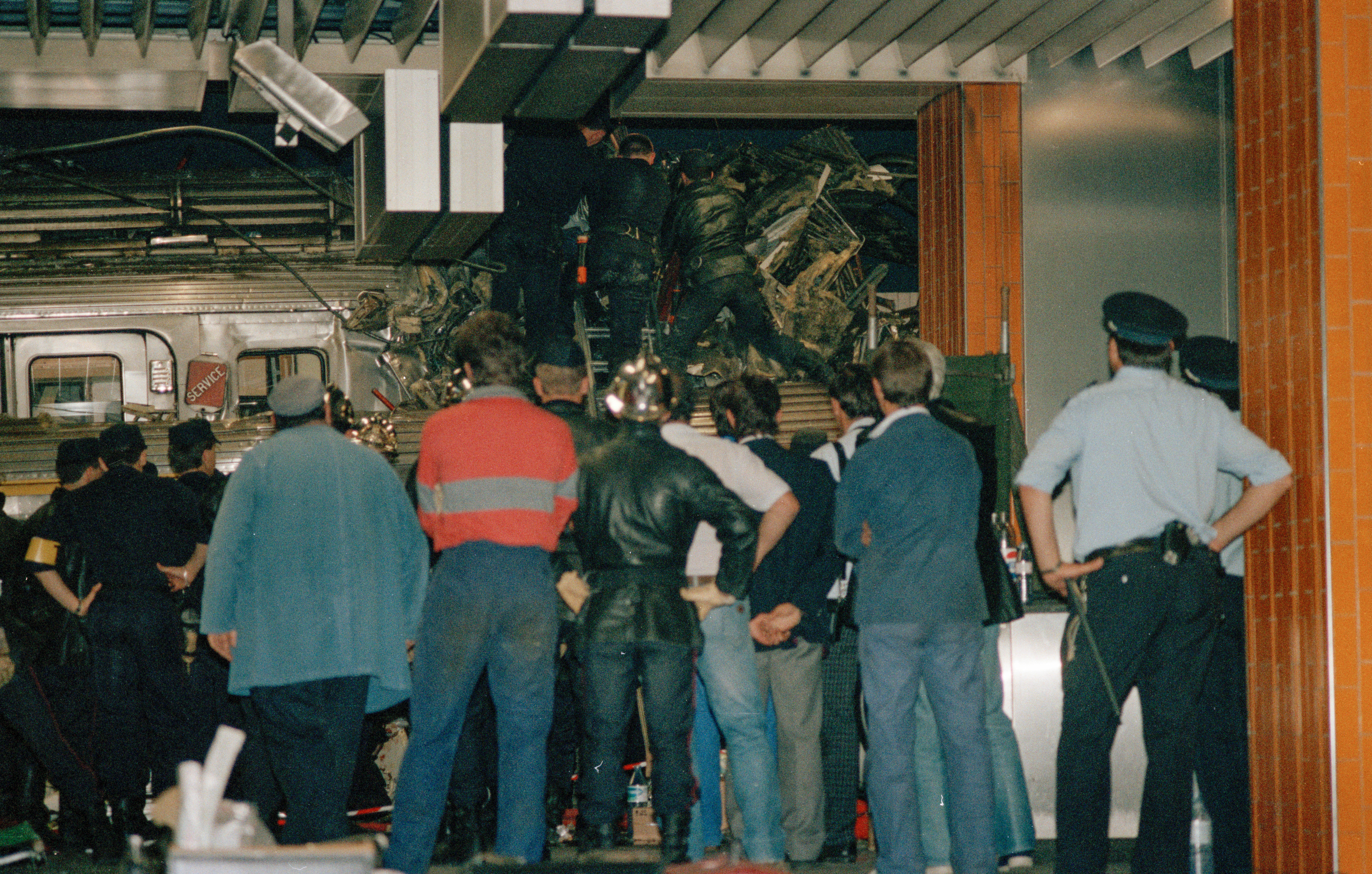
Gare de Lyon rail accident

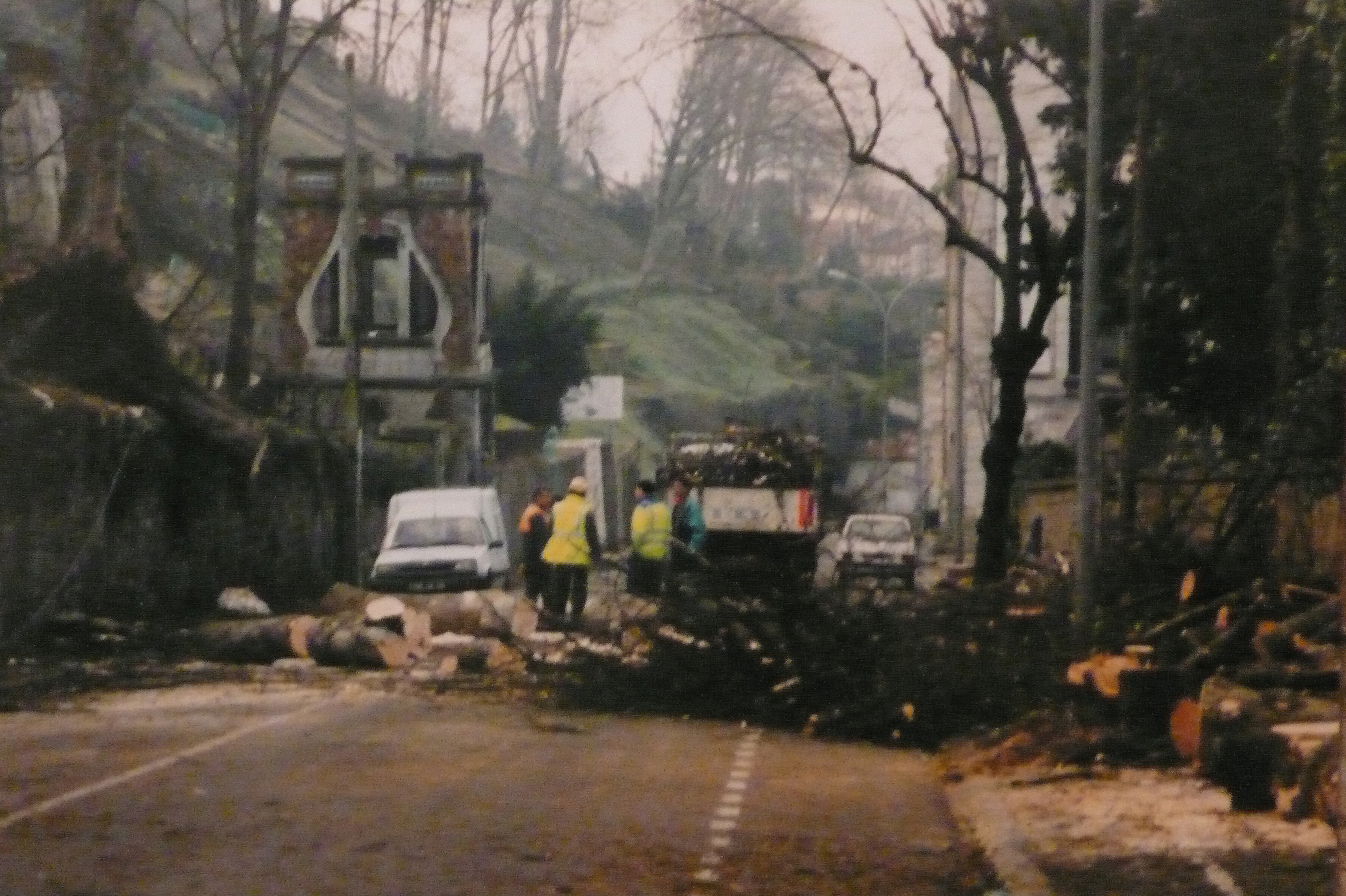
Cyclone Martin

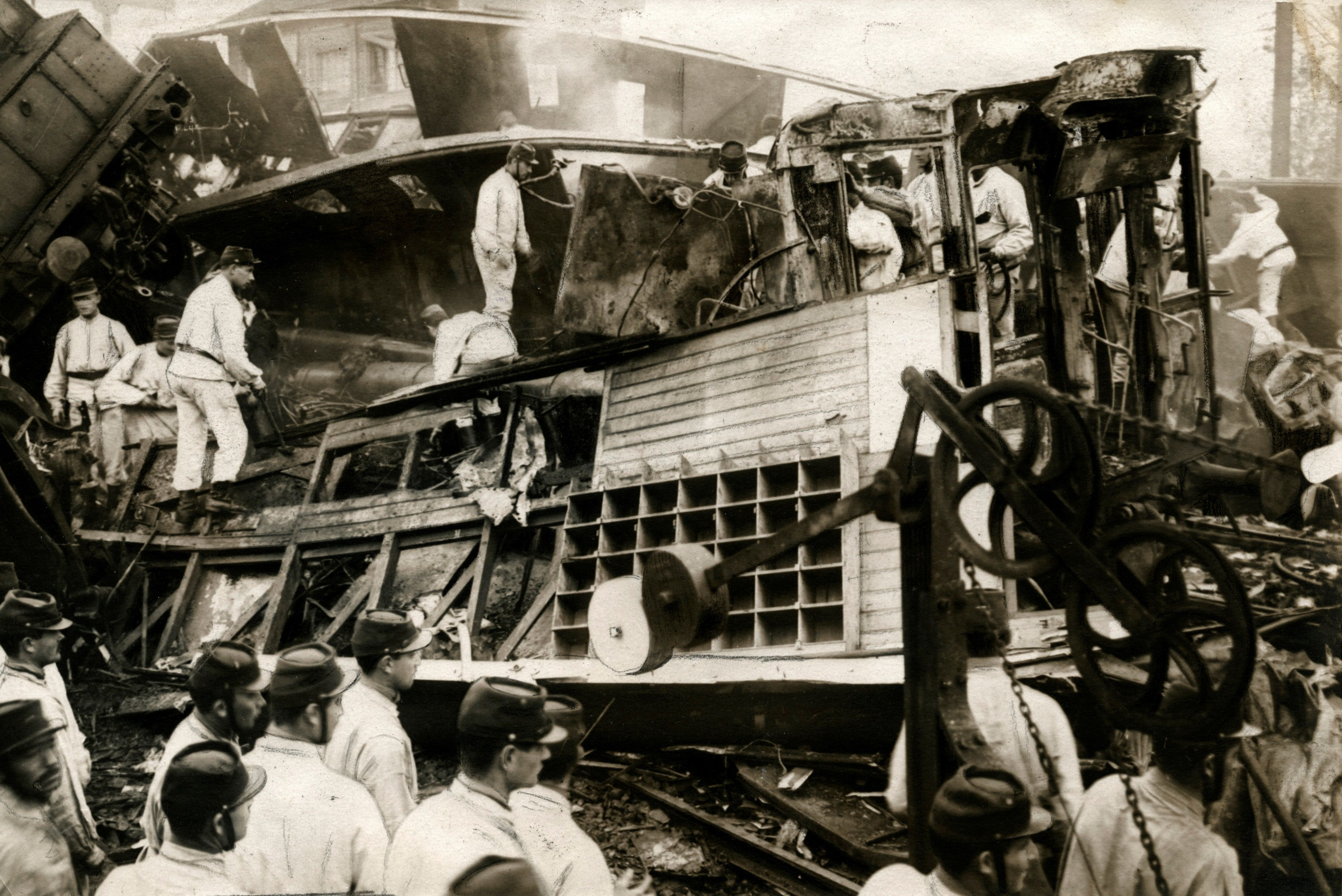
Melun train disaster

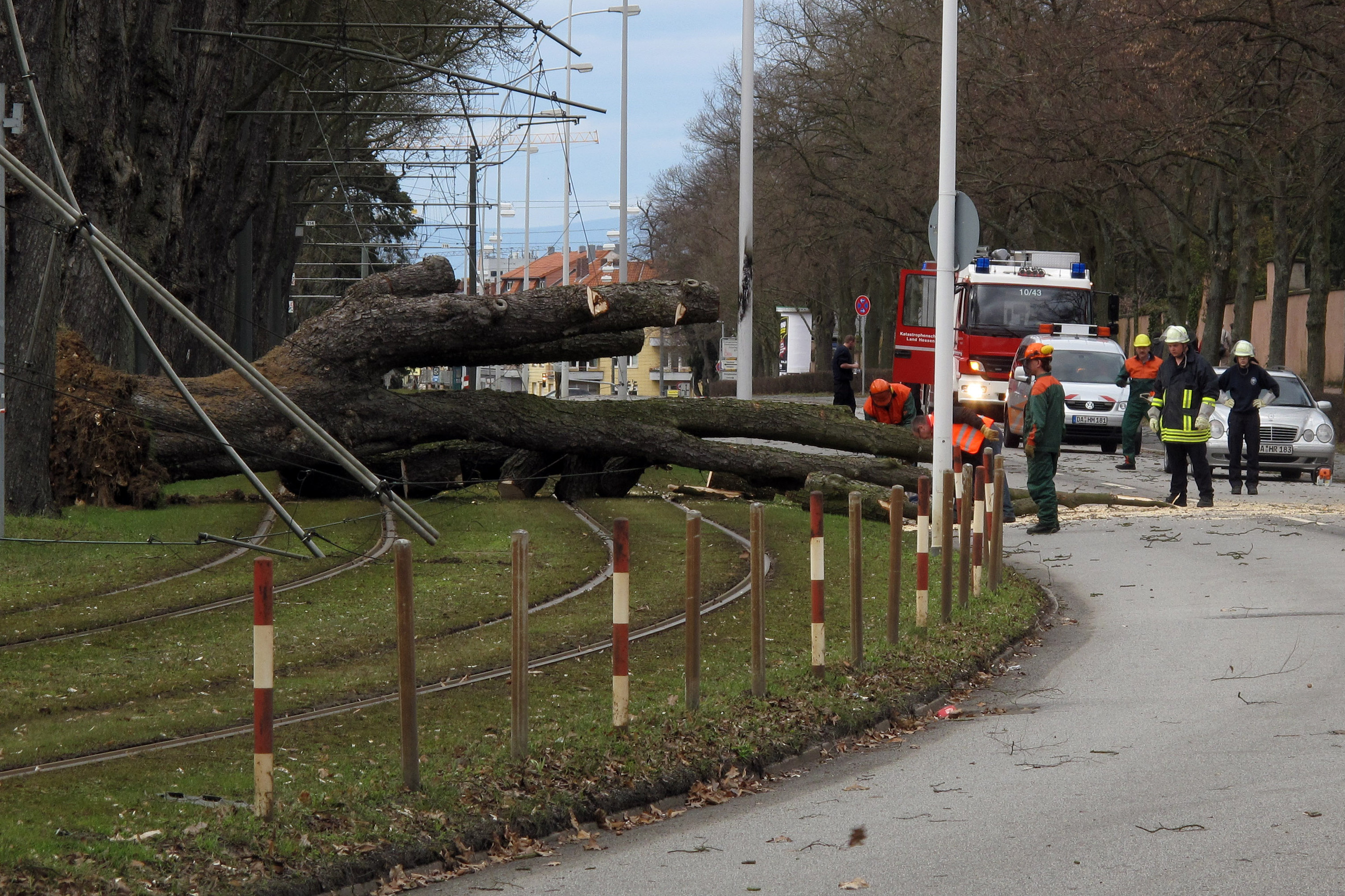
Cyclone Xynthia

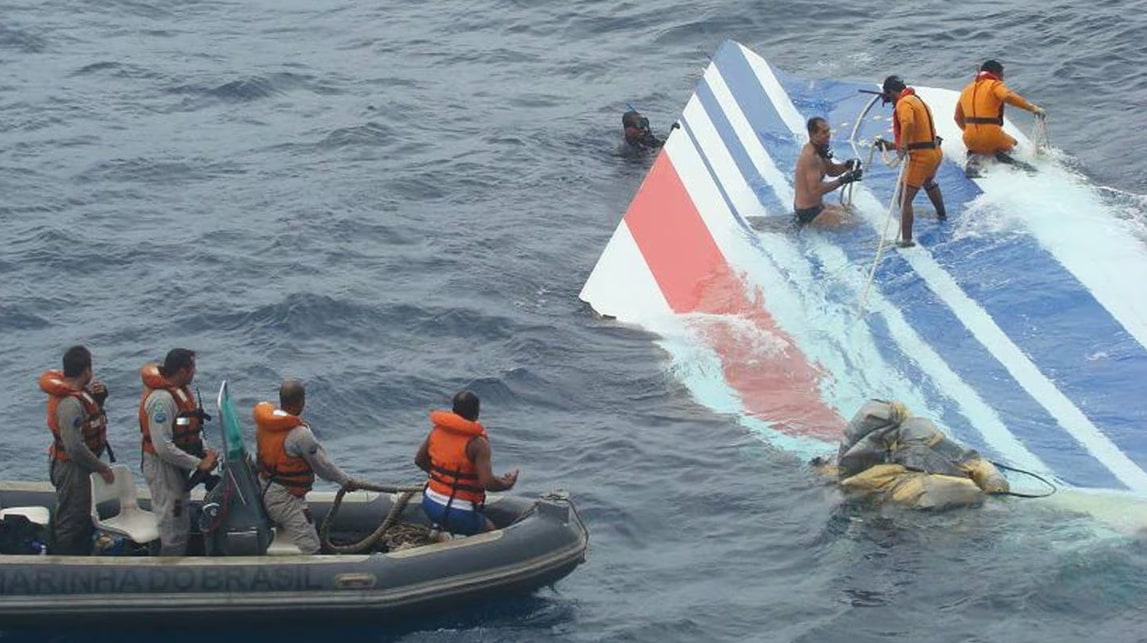
Air France Flight 447

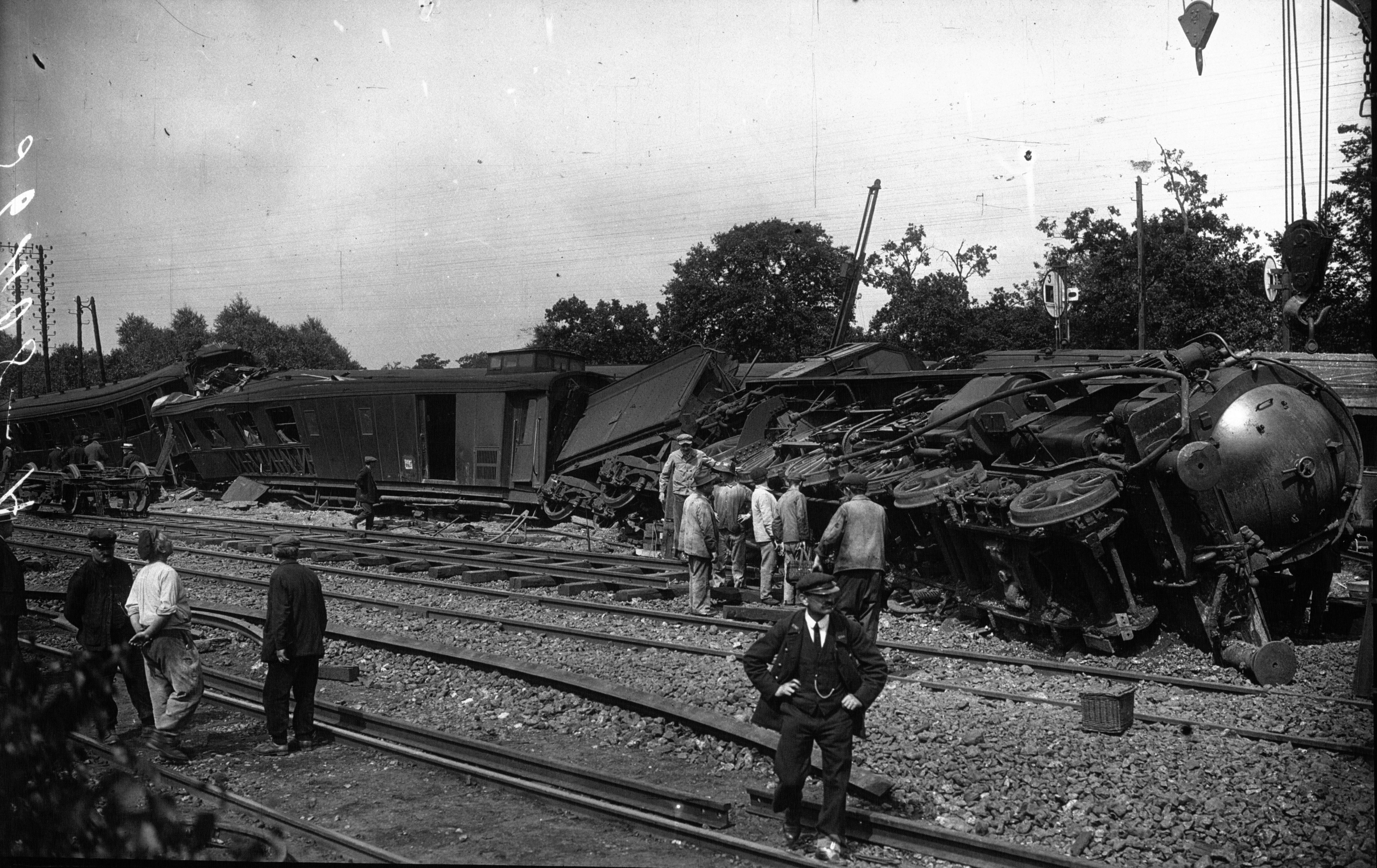
Achères disaster

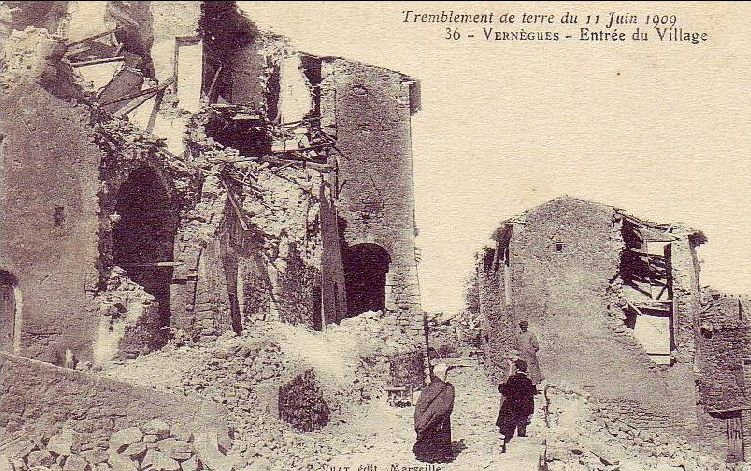
1909 Provence earthquake

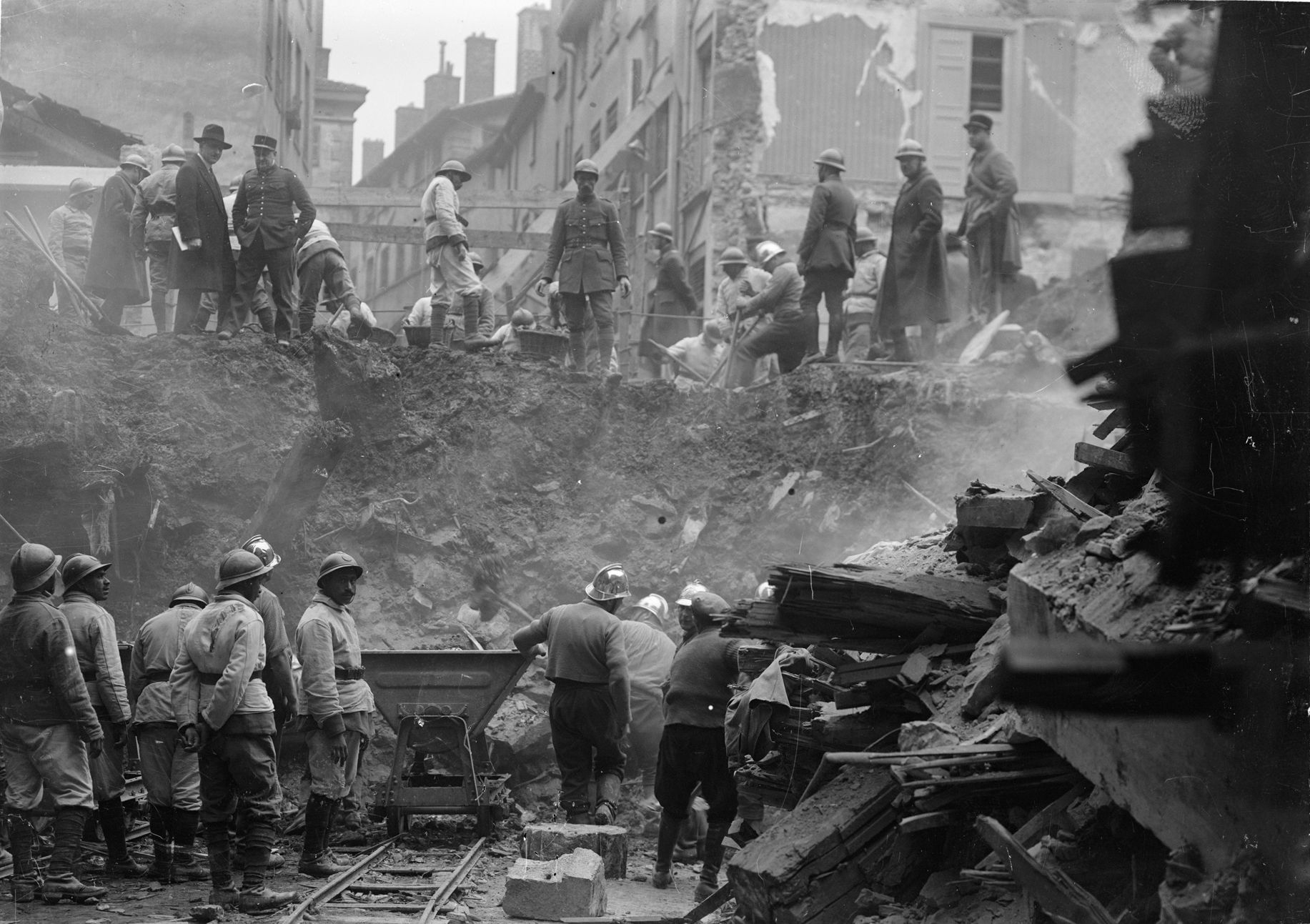
Fourvière landslide

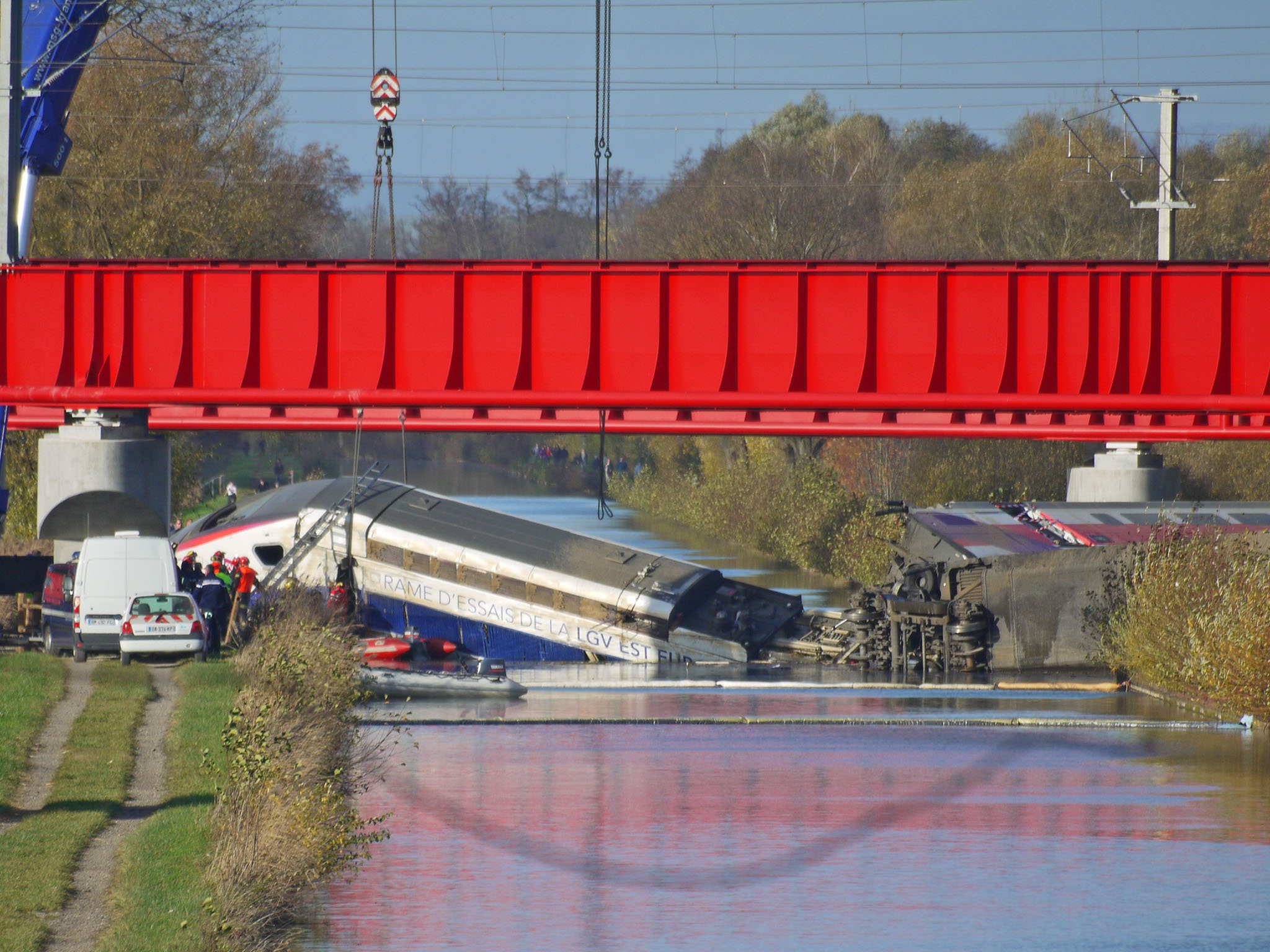
Eckwersheim derailment

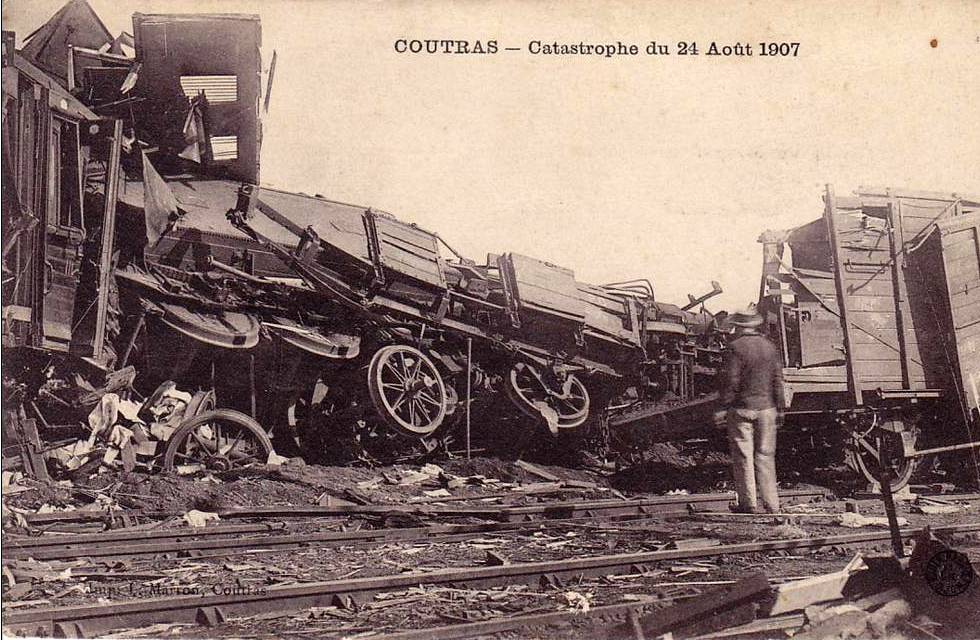
Coutras train accident

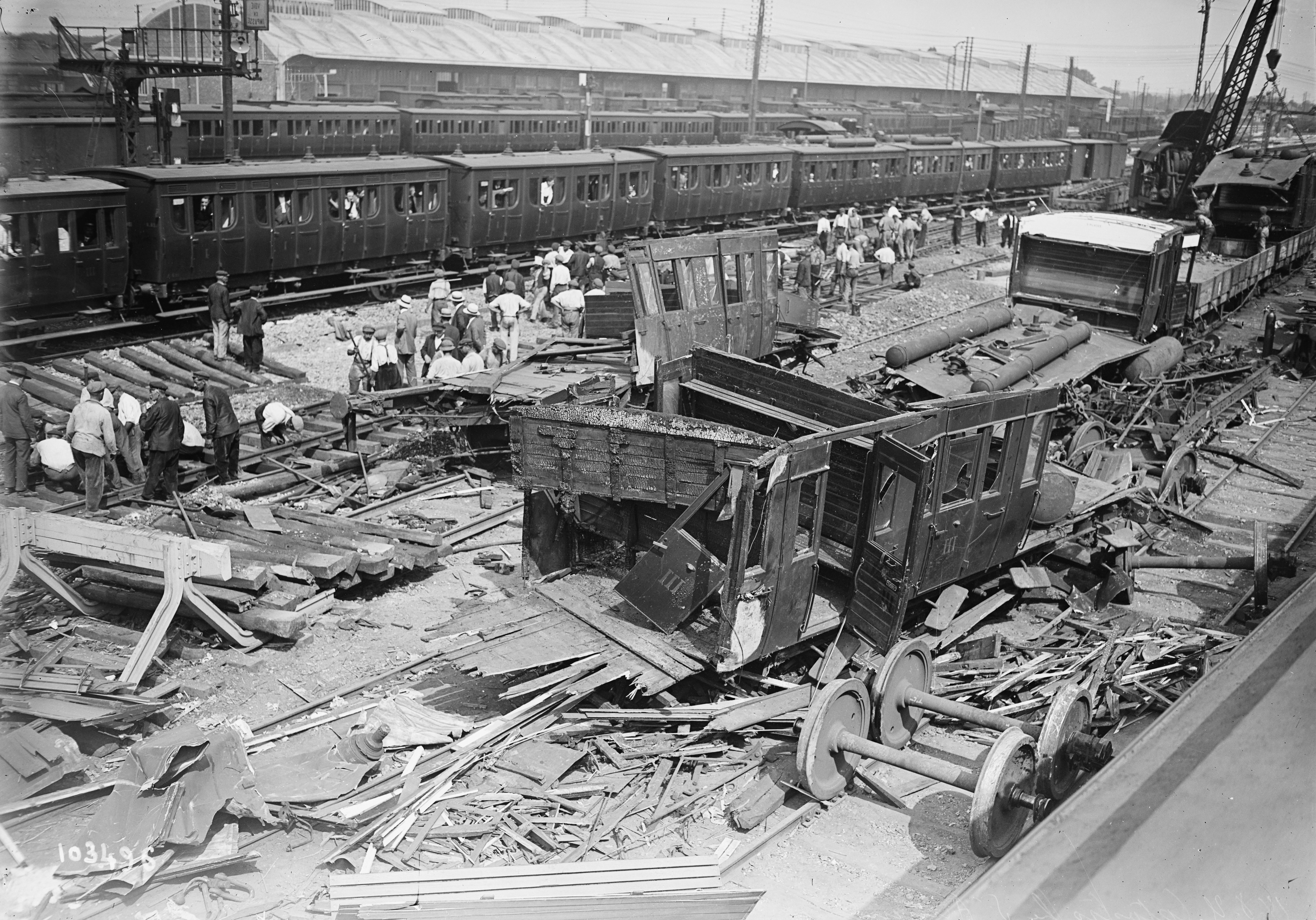
1925 Amiens train derailment

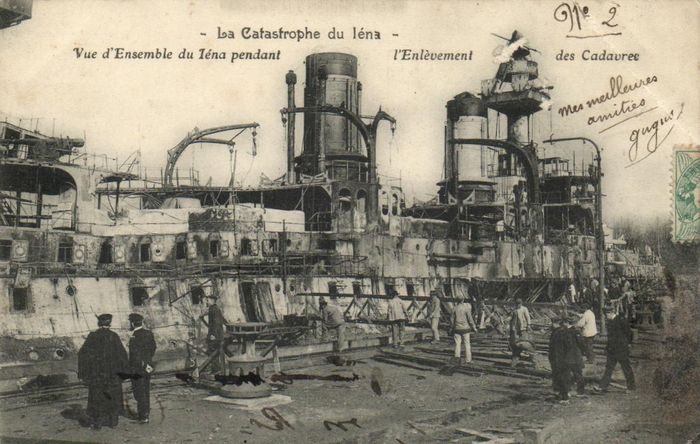
Iéna disaster

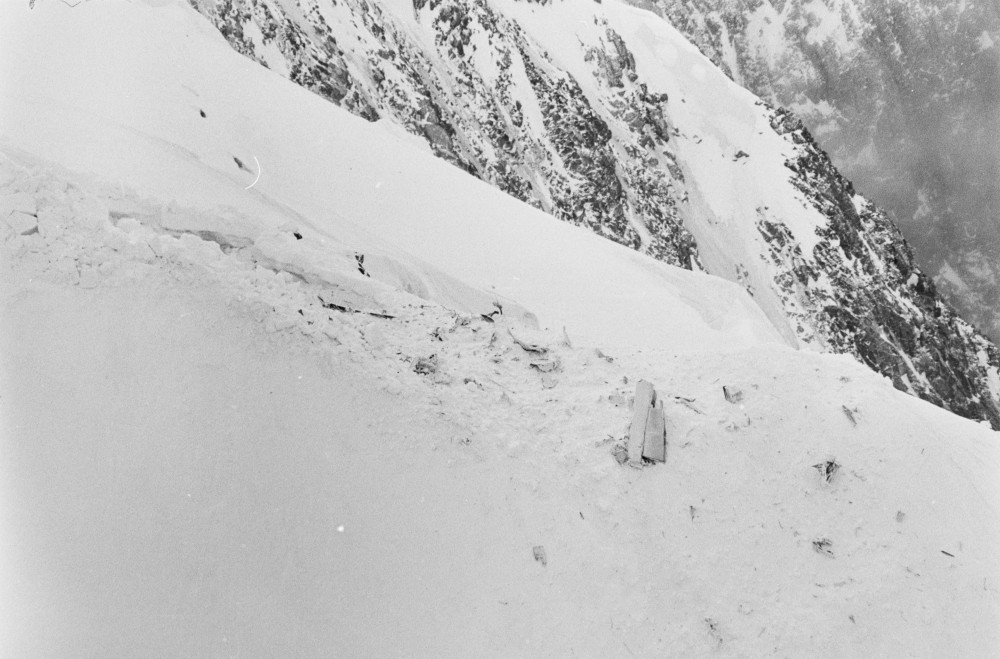
Air India Flight 101

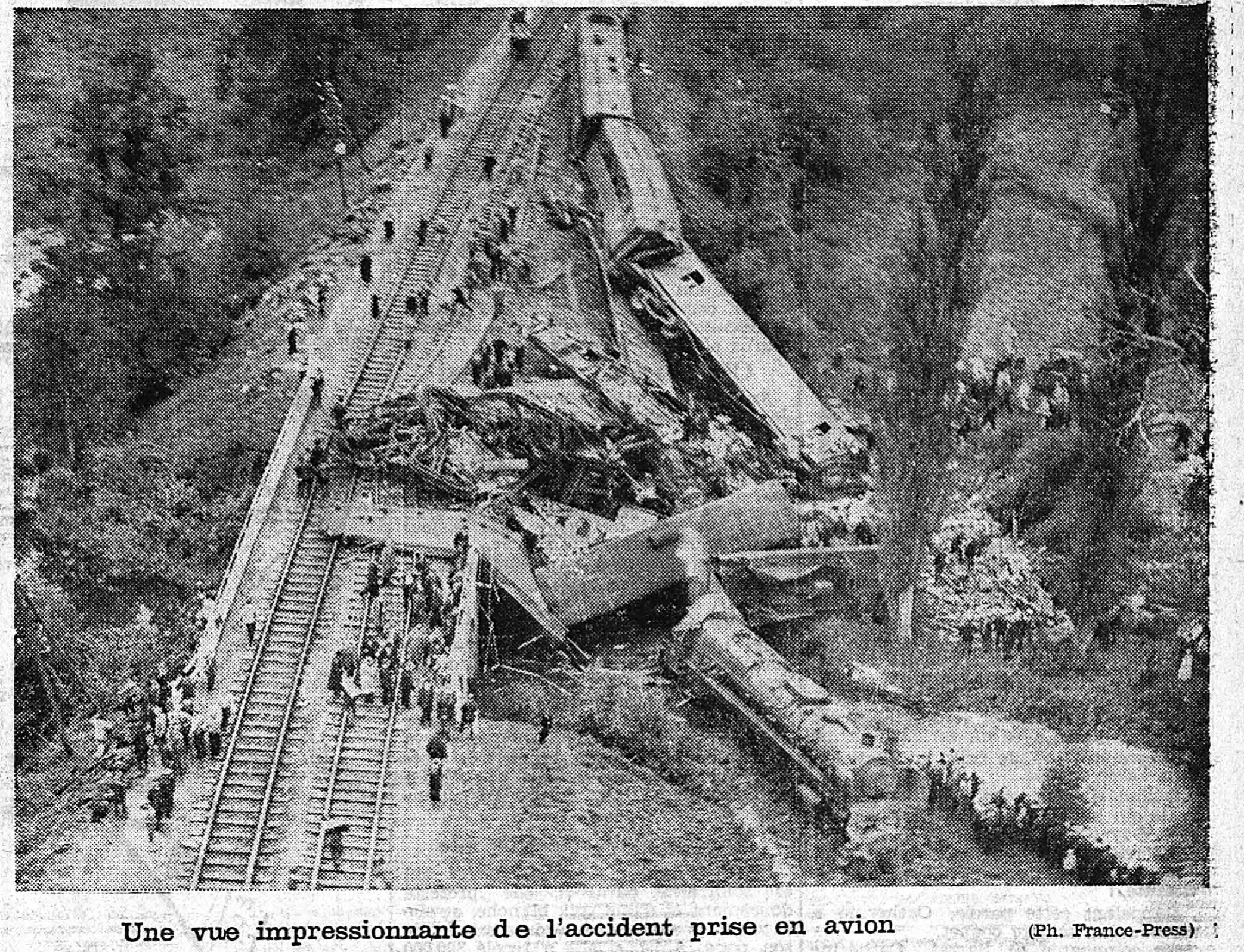
Saint-Élier train accident

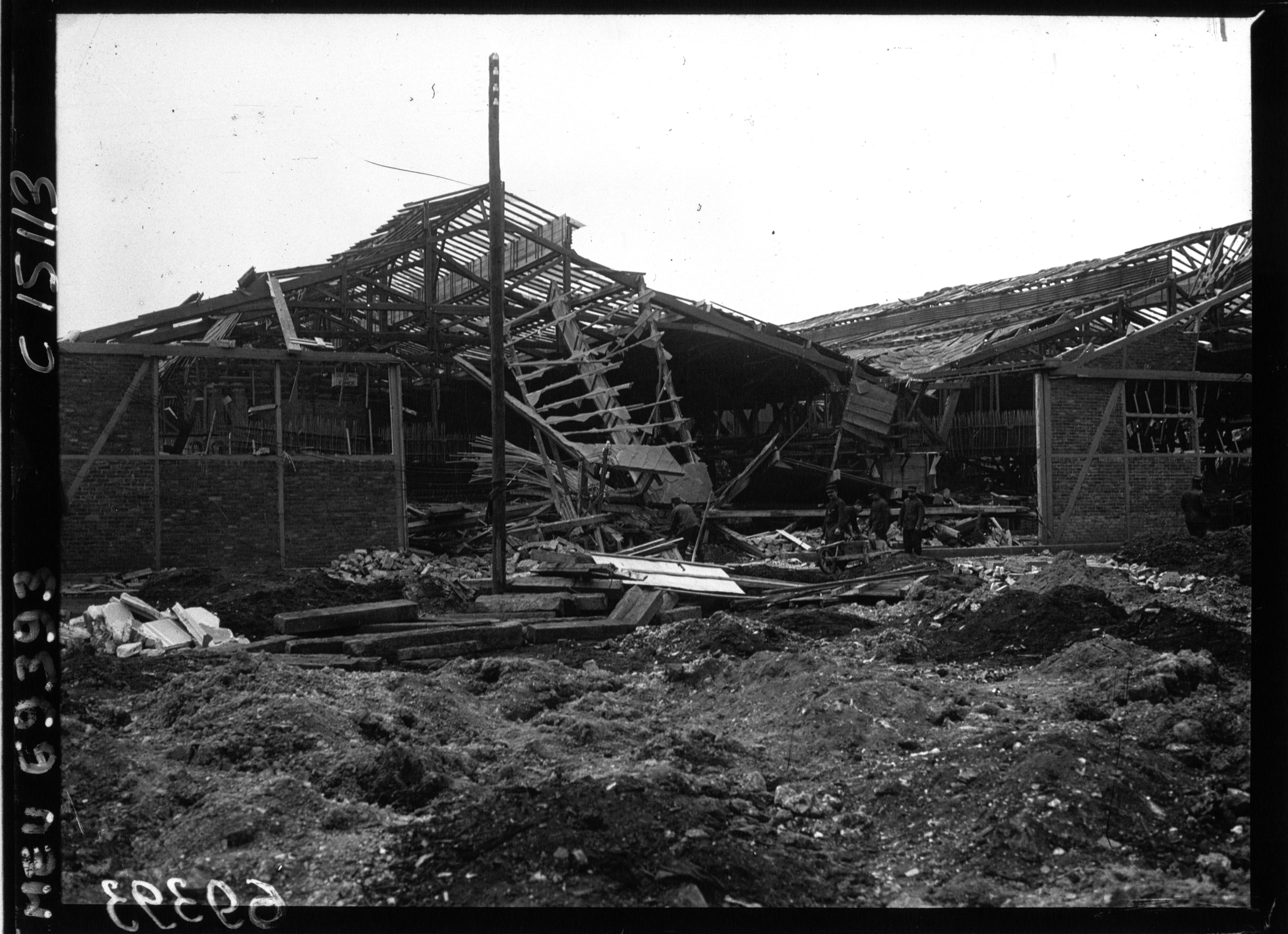
La Courneuve disaster

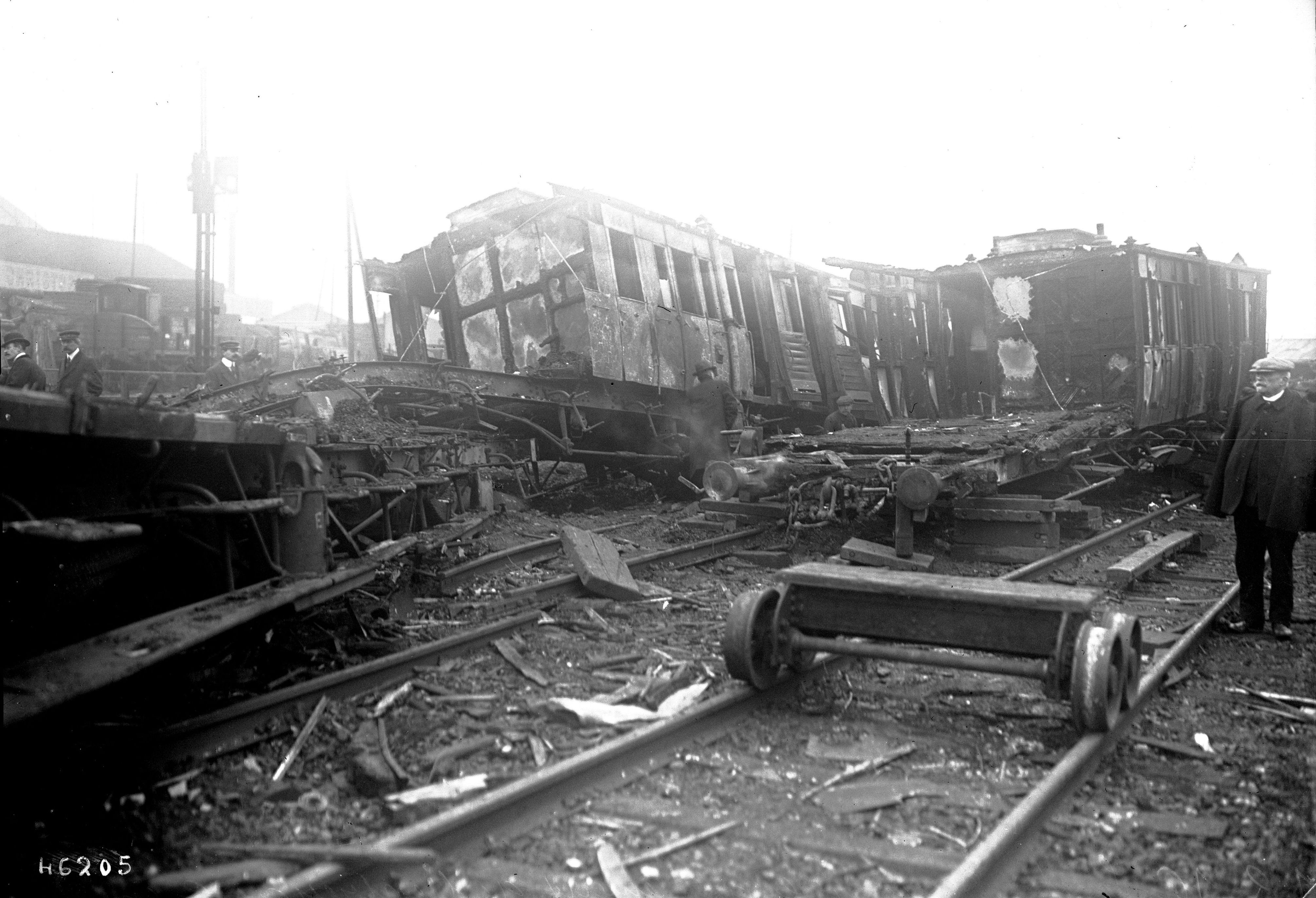
1916 Saint-Denis train disaster

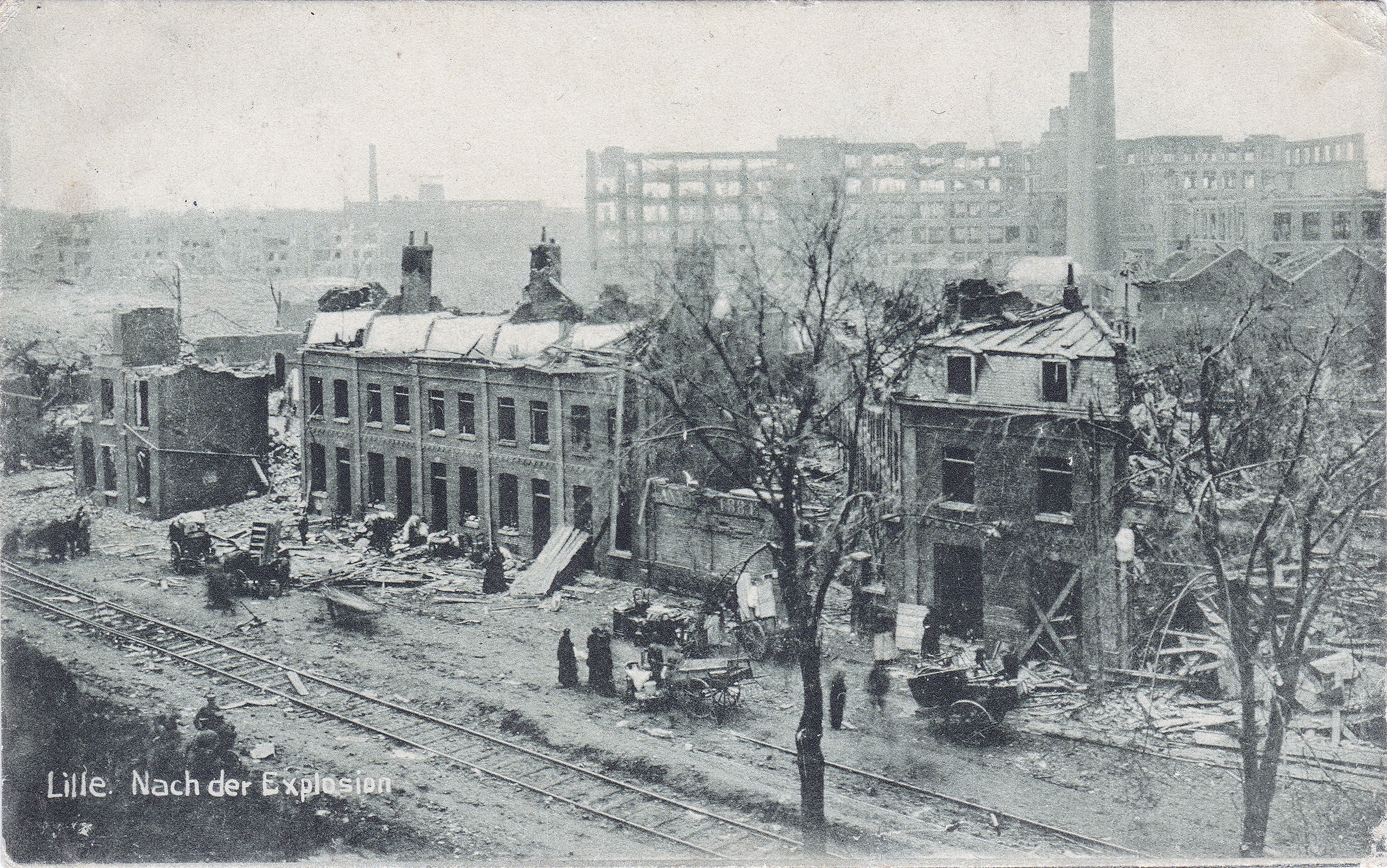
Explosion of the Dix-huit Ponts depot

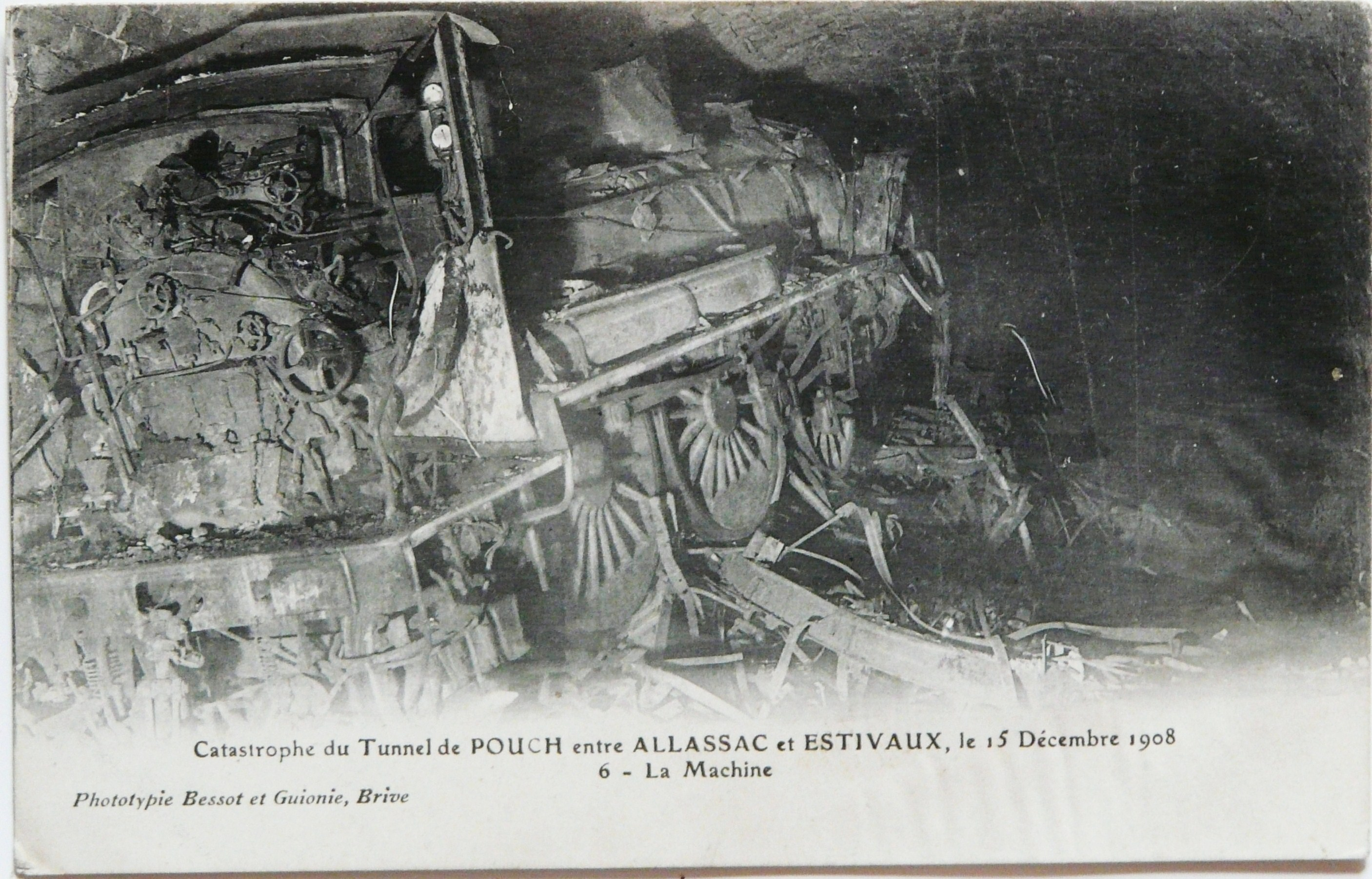
Pouch Tunnel rail disaster

== See also ==
- List of avalanches in France
- List of shipwrecks of France
- List of rail accidents in France
- List of disasters in Spain by death toll
- List of disasters in Great Britain and Ireland by death toll
- List of disasters in Canada by death toll
