= 1957 Saint-Paul bus accident =

Coordinates: 21.0161°S 55.2773°E

Details
- Date: November 10, 1957; 7:30 am
- Location: A road in Saint-Paul, Réunion
- Incident type: Bus accident
- Cause: Ruptured brakes

Statistics
- Bus: 1
- Passengers: At least 35
- Deaths: 27 (23 immediately, 4 later)
- Injured: 8
- Damage: One bus

The 1957 Saint-Paul bus accident took place on Sunday, 10 November 1957, on a road meandering down the steep mountainside above central Saint-Paul, one of the sub-prefectures of the island of Réunion. Caused by a rupture in the brakes of a bus on an incline, it killed 27 people and left a lasting mark on the collective memory of this French Indian Ocean département.

== Events ==
At 7:30 on the sunny morning of Sunday, 10 November 1957, the brakes of a bus belonging to the transport authority failed at one of the sinuous curves of the winding road traveling down the mountainside above the city centre of Saint-Paul in the western part of the island. It had been chartered by the diocesan social workers of Father Favron and was transporting parishioners to a construction site in Sainte-Anne, a neighbourhood of Saint-Benoît. The vehicle involved was in the second in a convoy traveling Sainte-Anne, and the accident took place just a few moments after its departure from Le Guillaume district where all but two of the victims lived. The driver was a native of Le Port.

The bus tumbled 25 metres (82 ft) before coming to rest at the foot of the cliff. One witness, M. Louisin, an employee of the mayor's office, was walking on the rue de la Caverne when he saw the bus plunge through the air and was paralysed for long moment before regaining his senses. The bus' roof detached and crashed on top of the passengers who may have reflexively tried to jump out of the bus during its fall in the hope of escaping the catastrophe, "a spectacular pirouette" that finished "with a horrific clatter", as the Journal de l'île de La Réunion observed on 12 November. Indeed, the sound of the accident could be heard hundreds of metres all around.

According to different witnesses, first aid was quickly set up around the crash site, where rescuers and bystanders mixed with passengers from the first bus in the convoy, which stopped. On the ground, below, above and in the wreckage, mutilated, crushed and bleeding bodies were everywhere. Human remains were found over ten metres around. A woman's severed head hung from a tree.

== Toll and consequences ==
Twenty-three individuals were killed instantly in the accident. In addition, the town transported twelve wounded to the Félix-Guyon Hospital in Saint-Denis. Four more died as a result of the crash, making it the deadliest in the history of Saint-Paul, if not of Réunion's entire history.

Among the public, the shock of the event was terrible. Following the event, the JIR opened a public subscription in collaboration with the diocesan social workers, calling on all its readers "to participate as widely as possible in this spirit of human brotherhood and of Réunion solidarity". The operation was a success, and the subscription's closing time was pushed back by forty-eight hours to allow the arrival on time of donations, spurred in part by lists distributed in numerous private establishments and several administrative services. On 19 November, less than ten days after the accident, the daily announced that over two million francs had been collected. By the 23rd, the deadline for donations, the sum had doubled, reaching over four million.

Despite a spirit of generosity that showed itself as far away as Mauritius and Metropolitan France, memories of the bus crash remain vivid locally, and according to a 2007 report by the JIR, "50 years later, this drama still remains etched into the collective memory". Mémona Hintermann, foreign correspondent for France 3, evoked this accident in her 2006 autobiographical work, Tête haute: as a poor child in Le Tampon, on the southern part of the island, it was after she saw television images of the aftermath of the event that she discovered the profession of television journalist. A memorial with all the victims' names and a cross was built along the cliff where the vehicle landed.
