= Franois rail disaster =

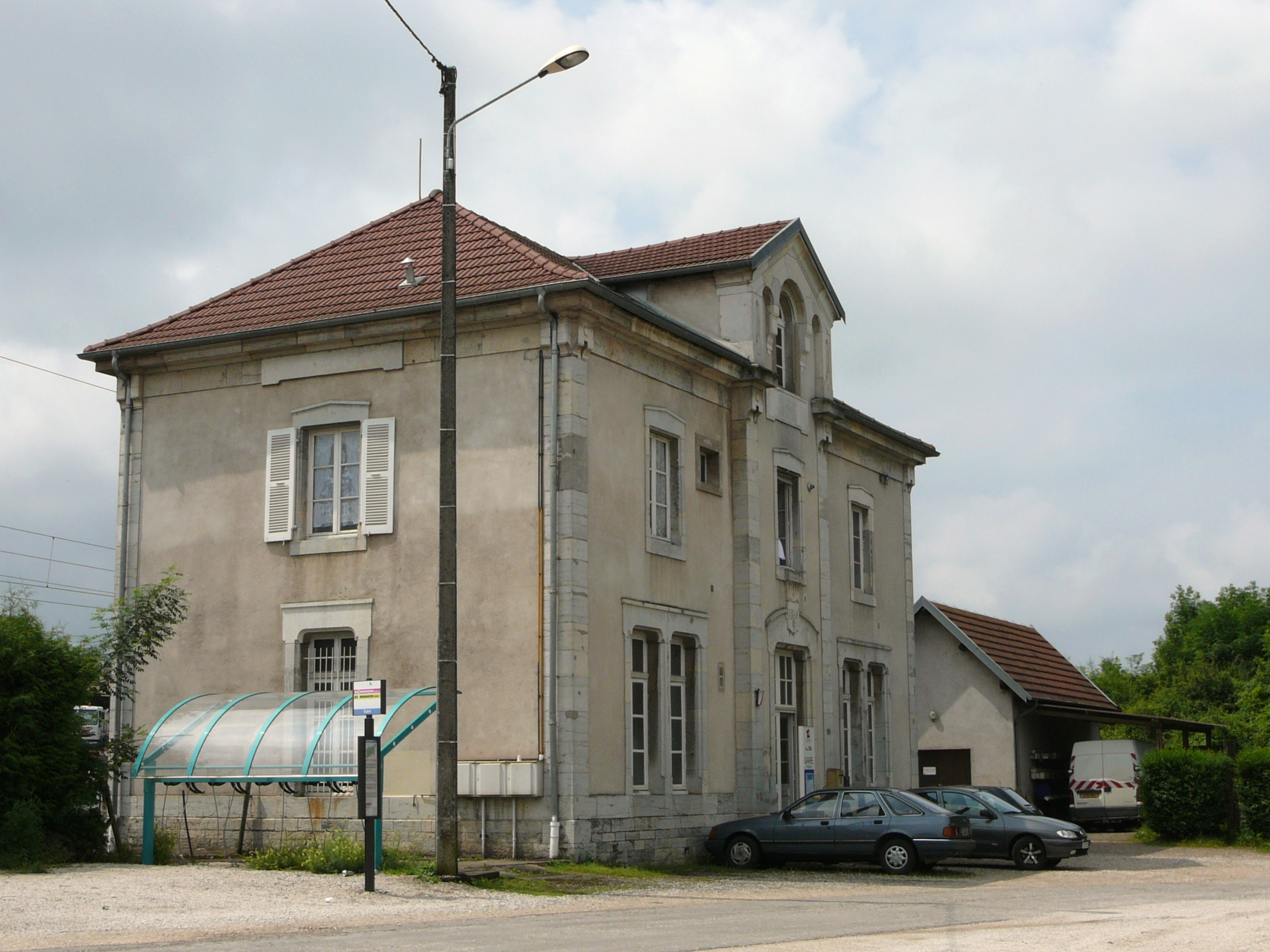
- The Franois station.

Details
- Date: 23 December 1866; Around 18:00
- Location: Between Dannemarie – Velesmes station and Franois station, France
- Operator: PLM
- Incident type: Head-on collision
- Cause: Human error

Statistics
- Deaths: 16
- Injured: 20

The Franois rail disaster, also known as the Franois catastrophe, was a fatal head-on collision between a passenger train and a freight train that occurred in eastern France on Sunday 23 December 1866 on the Dole‑to‑Belfort line of the Chemins de fer de Paris à Lyon et à la Méditerranée (PLM), between Franois station and Dannemarie – Velesmes station. Sixteen people died (thirteen instantly and three succumbed to their injuries later), and twenty were injured. Legal responsibility was ultimately placed on a single individual following a swift criminal investigation.

== Background ==
In 1866, except for the approximately eight-kilometre section between Besançon and Franois, shared by the two lines towards Dole and Arc-et-Senans, the Belfort–Dole line was still single-track. Trains running in opposite directions crossed paths at stations, generally spaced less than ten kilometres apart. Announcements and scheduling of train movements were managed from the terminal stations via exchanges of telegraphic dispatches between intermediate stations. A marked increase in freight traffic soon made the coordination of train operations more difficult, particularly because “optional” freight trains, created as needed, could be inserted between scheduled services, often resulting in cascading delays. To improve the line’s capacity, for the past eighteen months the company had been forming mixed trains by adding freight wagons to its local passenger omnibus trains.

== Accident ==
On Sunday, 23 December 1866, omnibus train no. 212 from Belfort to Dijon departed Besançon at 17:30. It was made up of two baggage vans and four passenger carriages, followed by seven freight wagons. At 17:48, it reached the junction station at Franois, the end of the double-track section. After a one-minute stop, the deputy stationmaster Louis-Xavier Tricot, on duty that Sunday, cleared it to depart for Dole.

About a kilometre and a half farther on, with night already fallen at that time of year and the train having picked up speed again, its driver, Auguste Klein, spotted in the fog, just after coming out of a curve, the lights of an oncoming train approaching on the same track, about a hundred metres away. It was the optional freight train no. 1521 from Dijon to Belfort, made up of 31 wagons, which had also been allowed onto the single track by the Dannemarie station, and was running at full speed to make up a delay of five to six minutes following an unscheduled stop at Saint-Vit station to pick up Mr Godefroy de Grémeries, its interim stationmaster, who was eager to return to Besançon.

In a common reflex action, the drivers of both trains reversed steam and sounded the brakes, then, unable to avoid the collision, jumped while still in motion just before impact. The crash occurred in the Félie cutting, at kilometre point 397. The two locomotives collided head-on and fell back, forming an obstruction onto which the wooden bodies of the first wagons shattered, having been torn from their chassis by the impact.

== Rescue efforts and casualties ==
Alerted by the noise of the collision, residents of nearby villages and staff from Franois station rushed to the scene and attempted, using improvised means, to free the victims. The Besançon station, notified by telegraph at 17:35, immediately dispatched a rescue train, which on its return brought the injured to the Besançon hospital. Thirteen people died instantly, and three more succumbed to their injuries shortly afterward or in the following days, bringing the total death toll to sixteen. There were twenty injuries, including five serious cases.

In one of the omnibus carriages that was destroyed, there was a group of 17 soldiers of German origin (Badeners, Bavarians, Prussians, and Württembergers) from the French Foreign Regiment, travelling from Strasbourg to their depot in Aix-en-Provence under the leadership of a detachment commander. Six were killed, and the other eleven were injured. Among the dead were also the train conductor Kuntz, crushed in the front van of the passenger train, and Mr Godefroy de Grémeries, the deputy stationmaster whose boarding at Saint-Vit had caused the unscheduled stop, he was the only person killed aboard the freight train.

The victims’ funerals were held on 28 December 1866 in Besançon, in the presence of a large crowd and local civil and military authorities, including the mayor, Charles-César Clerc de Landresse, and the Prefect of Doubs. Separate religious services were held for the Catholic and Reformed faiths, followed by a joint procession to the cemetery.

== Investigation ==
At the time, responsibility for safety on the single track was shared between station staff and train crews. Every train movement was signaled from its point of origin by telegraphic dispatch from the operations department, transmitted from station to station and indicating the planned crossing points with opposing trains. Management of these operations fell primarily to the stationmasters, who could, if necessary and based on the actual progress of trains, take the initiative to modify the original schedule. As a precaution, train crew members were also involved in the safety protocol. For instance, the conducteur-chef of a passenger train had to receive a route sheet at departure, a kind of log listing the planned journey and scheduled crossings, which he was required to fill out during the trip by recording significant events. In addition, upon reaching the crossing point, the stationmaster had to hand him and the engine driver a written document, known as a "bulletin de croisement", instructing them to wait for the opposing train.

On 23 December, the passing of optional train 1521 and its scheduled crossing at Franois at 17:42 with train 212 had indeed been notified by telegraph between 10 and 11 a.m. to all the stations on the line and deputy stationmaster Tricot had received the message, as he had immediately written it on a chalkboard displayed on the platform. At departure from Belfort, Mr Kuntz, the conducteur-chef of train 212, had also received a travel sheet containing the same instructions. Thus, in principle, train 212 should have been held at Franois until train 1521 arrived.

The judicial investigation, led by the Public Prosecutor’s Office in Besançon, therefore focused on identifying the cause of this protocol's failure. Responsibility appeared to rest with two employees: primarily the stationmaster at Franois, who should have held train 212 by handing "bulletins de croisement" to the engine driver and conductor. The latter could also be considered secondarily responsible for failing to remind his colleagues of the scheduled crossing. As conductor Kuntz was killed in the accident, only deputy stationmaster Tricot could be prosecuted. He was charged with involuntary manslaughter and injury under the 15 July 1845 railway police law and brought before the criminal court of Besançon, which tried him on 3 January 1867 in front of a large public audience, after hearing eighteen witnesses, three of them in his defense.

== Responsibility ==
To exonerate himself, Louis-François-Xavier Tricot (aged 35) attempted to shift the entire responsibility for the collision onto Mr Morel, his counterpart at Dannemarie. He claimed that, given the delay of the freight train, he had agreed with Morel to move the crossing point to Dannemarie and that it was therefore the latter who erred by sending train 1521 onto the single track. To support his claim, he presented his telegraph register, in which he had written the messages allegedly exchanged with Dannemarie, all of which confirmed the change. Among them was the message: "Let 212 depart, I will hold 1521", supposedly received from that station. He also submitted his "bulletins de croisement" logbook, the last stubs of which showed that two bulletins had been issued for driver Klein and conductor Kuntz to inform them of the change.

However, the accuracy of these claims could not be verified. At the time, although the electrical telegraph was installed on all major lines, the only trace of sent and received messages was the handwritten transcription by the telegraph operator. The system was thus prone to errors, or even falsifications. Conversely, the circumstances immediately before and after the accident, as described by multiple consistent witnesses, more plausibly suggested that Tricot, having failed to arrange the crossing at his station, clumsily tried to cover up by fabricating documents to implicate his colleague.

- Firstly, it was undisputed that between 14:00 and 17:00, he was not at the telegraph post but at a tavern opposite the station, where several witnesses testified he drank two litres of white wine with a track worker (a "brigadier poseur").
- Secondly, Mr Morel, stationmaster at Dannemarie, demonstrated, with supporting witness statements, that throughout the afternoon of the accident he had tried unsuccessfully to communicate by telegraph with Franois. Failing that, he finally sent a dispatch at 17:16 indicating that he would allow train 1521 onto the single track.
- Finally, a gendarmerie adjutant who arrived at the station after the accident testified that Tricot only produced his written "evidence" after being left alone in his office long enough to prepare the documents at that time. Driver Klein denied ever receiving a "bulletin de croisement", and Kuntz’s colleagues believed that had he received one, he would have attached it to his travel sheet, which he had not. Tricot simply replied that the train departed before he had a chance to hand them over.

In his closing argument, the prosecutor ruled out leniency, citing as an aggravating factor Tricot’s attempt to falsely accuse his colleague.

The defense lawyer, citing the defendant’s previously spotless record, pleaded at length about his excessive workload and a combination of errors by several parties, concluding: "In short, the fault of the company, the fault of several of its agents, that is how we can explain the tragedy we mourn today."

Unmoved by these arguments, the court the same day sentenced Louis-François-Xavier Tricot to the maximum penalty of five years in prison and a fine of 2,000 francs for "involuntary manslaughter and injury". The PLM company was declared civilly liable in the same judgment and reached out-of-court settlements with most victims or their families. However, as no agreement was reached with three of them, relatives of a passenger, conductor Kuntz, and a postal worker, the company was later ordered to pay them lump-sum and life annuity compensation. The company was also ordered to pay 4,000 francs to the niece of stationmaster Godefroy de Grémeries, after unsuccessfully trying to argue that he was responsible for the accident.
