= March 1970 =

Month of 1970

| << | March 1970 | | | | | >> |
| Su | Mo | Tu | We | Th | Fr | Sa |
| 1 | 2 | 3 | 4 | 5 | 6 | 7 |
| 8 | 9 | 10 | 11 | 12 | 13 | 14 |
| 15 | 16 | 17 | 18 | 19 | 20 | 21 |
| 22 | 23 | 24 | 25 | 26 | 27 | 28 |
| 29 | 30 | 31 |

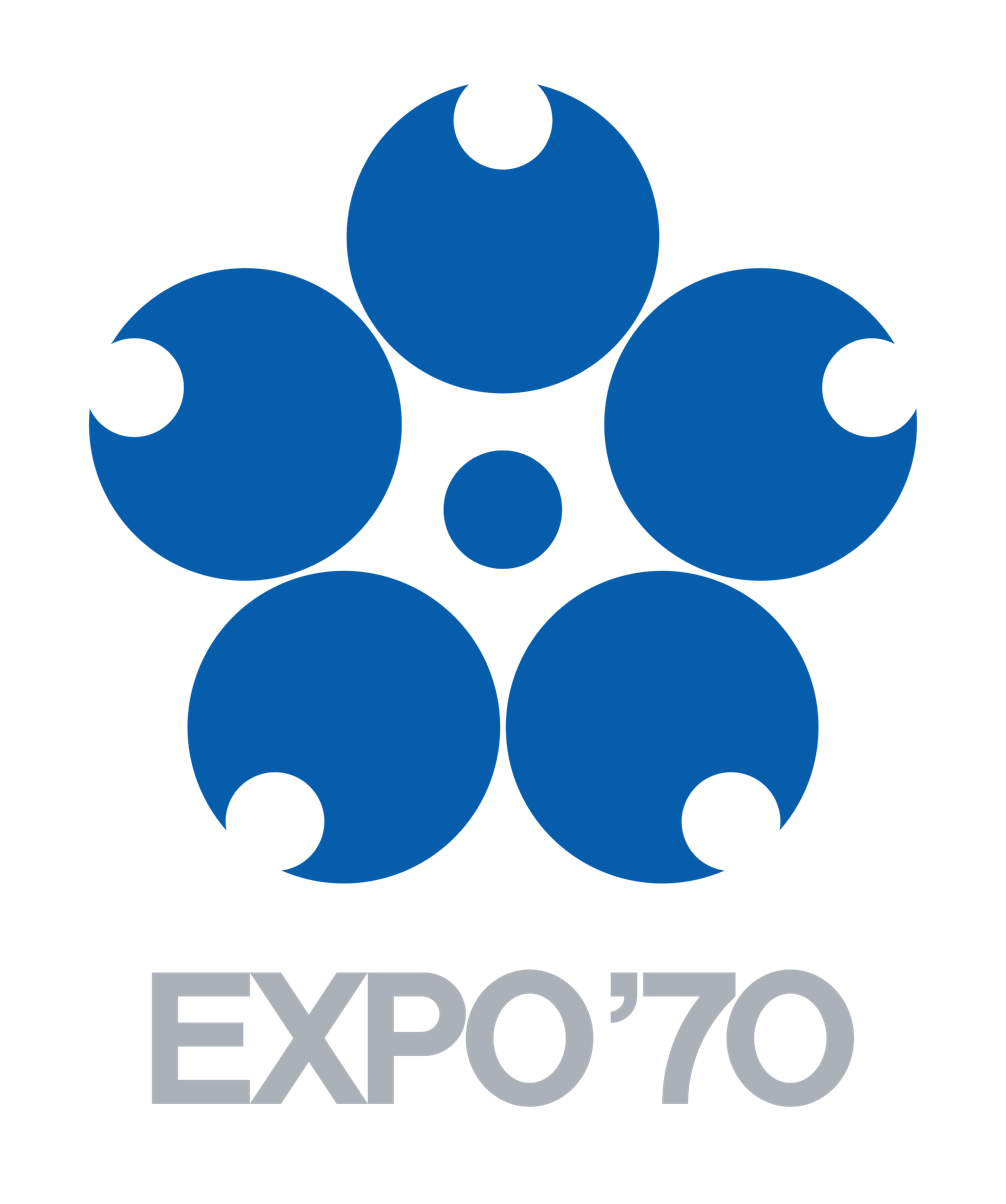
March 15, 1970: Expo '70 world's fair opens near Osaka

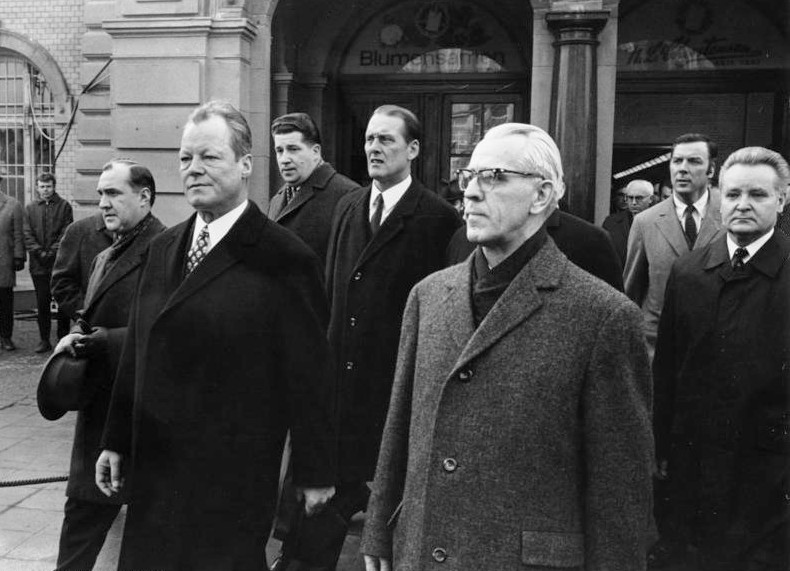
March 19, 1970: West Germany's Brandt and East Germany's Stoph meet at first summit

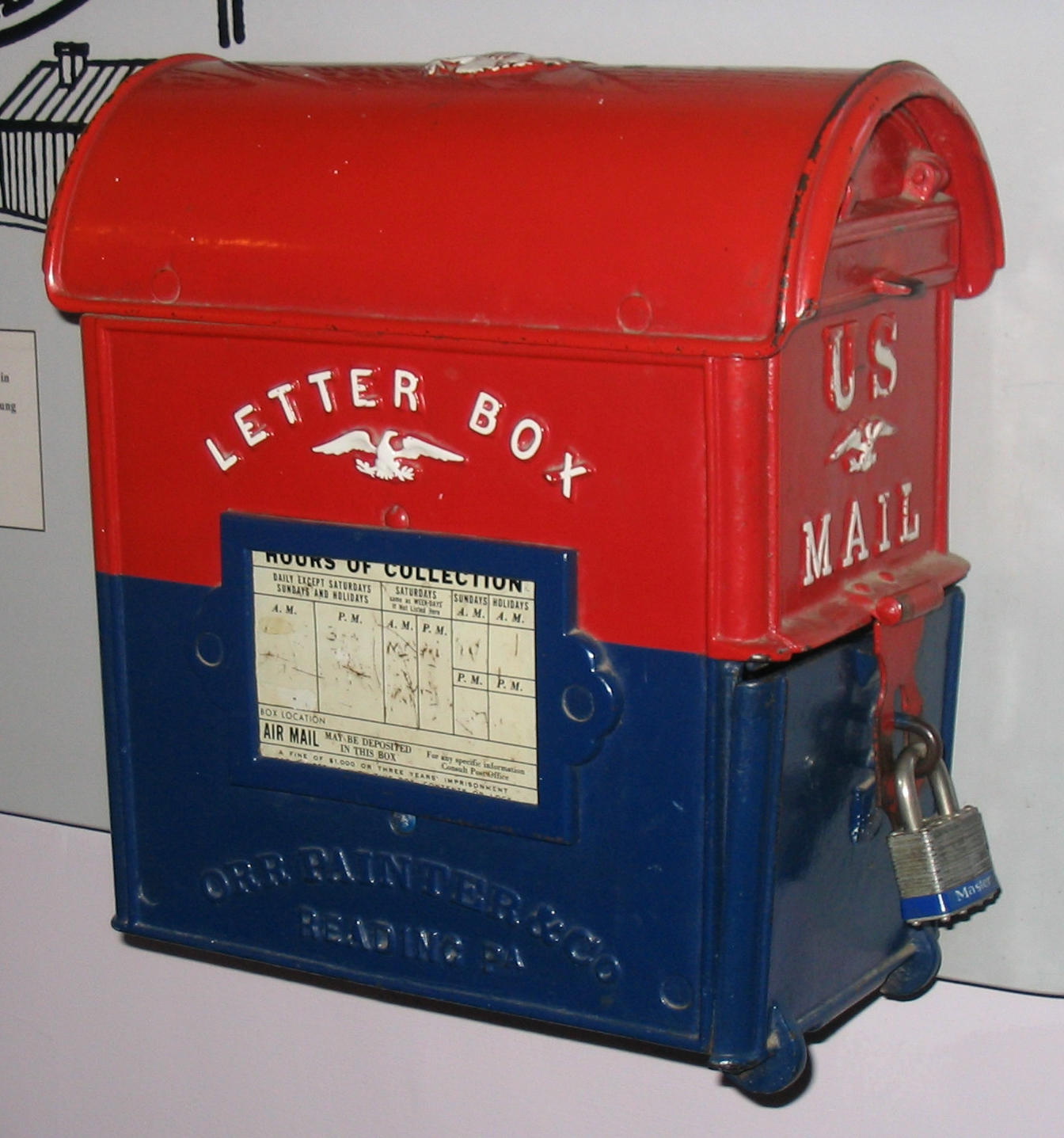
March 18–25, 1970: U.S. Mail employees walk out on strike

The following events occurred in March 1970:

== March 1, 1970 (Sunday) ==
- There was no clear winner in Guatemala's presidential election, as none of the three candidates had the required majority of the vote. Colonel Carlos Arana Osorio won 43% of the vote while campaigning on a "law and order" ticket, while Mario Fuentes Pieruccini got 35% and Jorge Lucas Caballeros had 22%. Arana's National Liberation Movement party won 31 of the seats in the 55-member Congreso de la República, however, and would select Arana as President on March 21.
- Eight days after the bombing of Swissair Flight 330 killed 47 people, a security agent aboard Ethiopian Airlines Flight 715 discovered a suitcase bomb before the airliner could depart Rome's Fiumicino airport on a multi-stop flight to Lubumbashi in the Congo. The explosive had been designed to detonate in midair while the flight was enroute from Rome to Athens, and would have killed all 40 people aboard.
- Born: Miho Nakayama, Japanese singer and actress, in Saku, Nagano (d. 2024)

== March 2, 1970 (Monday) ==
- Burlington Northern Railroad, the longest railway in the world by number of miles served, was created by the merger of four railroads in the northern United States The U.S. Supreme Court had upheld the merger on February 2, combining the Burlington Route (officially, the Chicago, Burlington and Quincy Railroad), the Great Northern Railway, the Northern Pacific Railway, and the Spokane, Portland and Seattle Railway into one network of 24,398 miles (39,265 km) of track in 18 U.S. states and two Canadian provinces. With combined assets of $2.8 billion USD, Burlington Northern was less than half as large as the Penn Central railroad's $6.5 billion properties.
- Rhodesia severed its last tie with the United Kingdom and declared itself a republic, with former British solicitor Clifford Dupont signing the proclamation dissolving the parliament and becoming the first President of Rhodesia. Dupont had been the administrator of Rhodesia since 1965, when Prime Minister Ian Smith, who continued as the head of government, had declared the African colony's independence from the United Kingdom. The republic's new constitution continued the policy of white minority rule. Rhodesia's 341,000 white citizens, representing seven percent of the population, maintained authority over the nation's 4,500,000 nonwhite residents.
- Born: Alexander Armstrong, English comedian and actor and half of the comedy duo Armstrong and Miller; in Rothbury, Northumberland
- Died: Daniel Frost Comstock, 76, American chemical engineer who developed the Technicolor process for motion pictures.

== March 3, 1970 (Tuesday) ==
- Norma McCorvey, a pregnant 22-year old resident of Texas, filed a federal lawsuit under the name "Jane Roe" with the assistance of Dallas lawyers Sarah Weddington and Linda Coffee, seeking the right to an abortion and commencing what would become the landmark United States Supreme Court case of Roe v. Wade.
- A mob of at least 150 white men and women attacked two school buses in the small town of Lamar, South Carolina as the vehicles were bringing African-American students to morning classes in compliance with a racial desegregation order. As the buses approached Lamar High School, they were struck by bricks and rocks, and some students were injured by broken glass. South Carolina Highway Patrol troopers, on alert for violence after incidents the day before, rescued the 32 students and escorted them to safety. The protesters then overturned the empty buses. Within two days, state police arrested 30 of the riot leaders, identified by photographs taken by the State Law Enforcement Division. The first man arrested was the owner of a cafe in nearby Lydia, who had created the anti-busing group "Darlington County Council of Citizens for Freedom of Choice". He would later serve a two year jail sentence for rioting.
- Born: Julie Bowen, American TV actress and winner of two Emmy Awards for her role as Claire Dunphy on Modern Family; in Baltimore

== March 4, 1970 (Wednesday) ==
- All 57 of the crew of France's Marine Nationale submarine Eurydice were killed after the vessel made a practice dive and never resurfaced. The Daphné-class submarine was in 2,000 feet (610 m) deep waters in the Mediterranean Sea off of Cape Camarat, after sailing from its base at Saint-Tropez. At 7:00 a.m. local time, it radioed that it was making a dive and less than an hour later, signs of a violent explosion were detected. An oil slick and debris from the Eurydice were found late in the afternoon by rescue ships.
- Born: Mohammed Shia' Al Sudani, Iraqi politician, Prime Minister of Iraq since 2022; in Baghdad.

== March 5, 1970 (Thursday) ==
- The Nuclear Non-Proliferation Treaty went into effect after being ratified by 47 nations. Leaders of the three sponsoring nations — U.S. President Richard M. Nixon, Soviet Union Premier Alexei N. Kosygin, and United Kingdom Prime Minister Harold Wilson — signed instruments of ratification in their respective capitals, and leaders of five other nations executed similar documents. Treaty members agreed that they would not share nuclear weapons, nor acquire such weapons in the future. Under the terms of the agreement, signed on July 1, 1968, the pact would go into effect upon ratification by the three sponsors and by at least 40 other nations.
- The disaster film genre of movies was revived with the premiere of Airport in New York City before its U.S. and worldwide release. Based on the bestselling suspense novel by Arthur Hailey, Airport was made on a budget of USD $10.2 million and would gross almost ten times that amount worldwide ($100.5 million), using the formula of a cast of well-known actors facing a disaster (in this instance, a hijacked Boeing 707 of the fictional "Trans Global Airlines". The film was nominated for nine Academy Awards, winning one for Helen Hayes as Best Supporting Actress, and its soundtrack won a Grammy Award.
- Born:
  - Aleksandar Vučić, President of Serbia since 2017 and previously Prime Minister from 2014 to 2017; in Belgrade, Yugoslavia
  - Lisa Robin Kelly, American TV actress known for the role of Laurie Forman on That '70s Show; in Southington, Connecticut (d. 2013 of drug overdose)
  - John Frusciante, American rock guitarist for the Red Hot Chili Peppers; in Queens, New York City

== March 6, 1970 (Friday) ==
- Three members of the Weathermen, an American militant group, were killed in New York City when a pipe bomb they had constructed exploded prematurely. The group had settled in a four-story townhouse at 18 West 11th Street in Greenwich Village and was constructing explosives in the basement. Shortly before noon, dynamite in one of the bombs exploded and triggered secondary gas line blasts. Diana Oughton and Terry Robbins, who were working on a bomb, were killed instantly, along with Ted Gold, who had walked in to the home moments before the explosion. Cathlyn Platt Wilkerson, whose father owned the townhouse and was out of town, escaped along with another accomplice, Kathy Boudin. Another member of Weather Underground, Mark Rudd, would write later that the group had planned to place the bomb at a dance hall at Fort Dix, New Jersey, where U.S. servicemen and their dates would have attended a dance. Wilkerson would surrender to the police in 1980, and would spend 11 months in prison. Boudin would be arrested in 1981 after driving the getaway vehicle in an armored car robbery, remaining incarcerated until 2003.
- Süleyman Demirel of AP became Prime Minister of Turkey upon forming a new government of ministers.
- Died: William Hopper, 55, American film and TV actor known for portraying Paul Drake in the Perry Mason television series; following a stroke.

== March 7, 1970 (Saturday) ==
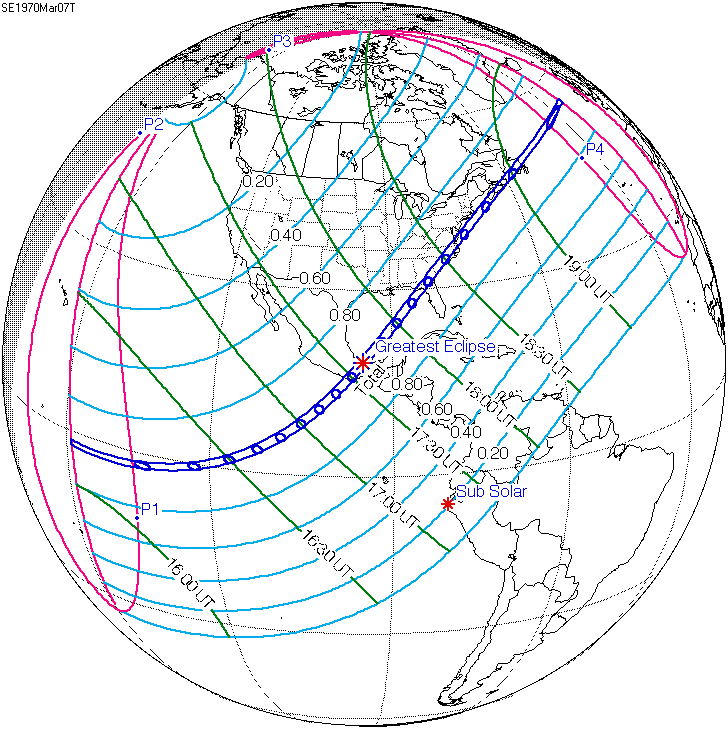
Path of the eclipse

- A solar eclipse passed along the Atlantic coast region. Totality was visible in an 85 mi (137 km) wide band across southern Mexico, portions of the Atlantic Coast of the United States, and Nova Scotia and Newfoundland in Canada A reporter at the time noted that "There won't be another total eclipse of comparable duration in or near the United States until 2024."
- Born: Rachel Weisz, English-born film and television actress, winner of best supporting actress Oscar for The Constant Gardner and BAFTA award for The Favourite; in Westminster
- Died: Wally Vernon, 65, American comedian and character actor in film, was fatally injured by a hit-and-run driver while he and his wife were crossing a street in Van Nuys, California

== March 8, 1970 (Sunday) ==
- A team of assassins in Nicosia attempted to assassinate Makarios III, the President of Cyprus, riddling the presidential helicopter with machine gun fire as it was lifting off from the rooftop of his residence, Nicosia Palace. Palace guards fired at the assassins, Greek Cypriot members of the EOKA group advocating the island's annexation by Greece, who had taken a position on the roof of a nearby building. President Makarios escaped injury; the helicopter pilot was critically wounded by three bullets, but managed to safely land the copter .
- Born: Jason Elam, American-born pro football kicker; in Fort Walton Beach, Florida
- Died: Waldo Peirce, 85, American impressionist painter nicknamed "The American Renoir"

== March 9, 1970 (Monday) ==
- The United States Department of Defense, on orders from President Nixon, reversed a policy of U.S. secrecy regarding American military involvement in Laos. The move came after a March 6 statement from Nixon, that no Americans stationed in Laos had been killed in combat; in fact, U.S. Army Captain Joseph K. Bush, Jr., based in Laos, had died 13 months earlier when his helicopter was shot down over the Plain of Jars. Previously, the DOD had listed U.S. casualties in Laos as being part of the war in Vietnam.
- Died: Jackie Opel, 32, Barbados-born musician who created the Barbadian music style spouge, was killed in a car accident in Bridgetown

== March 10, 1970 (Tuesday) ==
- France made its first successful launch of its new 78 ft (24 m) tall, three-stage Diamant-B rocket, and the first satellite launch from its new Guiana Space Centre. Prior to building the rocket base in Kourou in the South American colony of French Guiana, the French space program had launched four satellites from Hammaguir in the Republic of Algeria The payload was two West German satellites, Wika and Mika, sent into orbit to study the Van Allen radiation belt; vibrations from the first rocket stage, however, disabled the Mika communication system.
- The first Arctic Winter Games were inaugurated as a competition for hundreds of athletes from Canada's Northwest Territories (N.W.T.) and the Yukon territory, as well as the United States state of Alaska, with sponsorship by the state and territorial governments of the participant areas. Canadian Prime Minister Pierre Trudeau appeared at Yellowknife, the capital of the N.W.T., to open the five-day event. The first day included ice hockey, basketball, and cross-country skiing while the Saturday closer was for "Eskimo Games Day" in demonstrations of the games of ayagaq, ipirautaqturniq, the blanket toss (nalukataq) and harpoon throwing
- Two residents of East Germany made an unsuccessful attempt to flee to West Germany by hijacking a domestic Interflug airline flight. The couple, later identified as Christel and Eckhard Wehage, drew guns after the Antonov 24 turboprop plane had departed East Berlin toward Leipzig. The East German news agency ADN reported that the pilots, instead, landed back the plane back in East Berlin and that the Wehages committed suicide before they could be arrested.
- Born: Michel van der Aa, Netherlands classical music composer; in Oss

== March 11, 1970 (Wednesday) ==
- The government of Iraq and the leader of the nation's Kurdish people signed a 15-point autonomy agreement, bring an end to the First Iraqi–Kurdish War after eight and a half years of fighting. Future Iraqi President Saddam Hussein and Kurdish leader Mustafa Barzani concluded the pact after negotiations in Lebanon, but fighting would resume after Iraq's abrogation of the agreement in 1974.
- Hawaii became the first state in the United States to allow abortion at the request of the woman, on the condition that the fetus not be viable outside the uterus and that the woman had been a resident of the state for at least 90 days. The bill had passed the state House of Representatives, 31-20, on February 18 and the state Senate followed, 15-9, on February 24. Personally opposed to abortion, Hawaii Governor John A. Burns refused to sign it into law, but also declined to veto the bill, allowing it to become law. Almost 1,200 abortions were legally performed in the first four months after the law took effect
- Died: Erle Stanley Gardner, 80, American lawyer and author who created the Perry Mason mystery series of stories and novels starting in 1933.

== March 12, 1970 (Thursday) ==
- For the first time in British history, citizens younger than 21 were able to cast ballots in a parliamentary election. The opportunity came in the by-election, to fill a vacancy in the Bridgwater constituency in the House of Commons that followed the October 31 death of Gerald Wills. Miss Trudy Sellick, a secretary who had turned 18 years old earlier in the day, registered the first under-21 vote in British history; she was in line when the polling station at North Newton, Somerset, opened at 7:00 in the morning. Conservative Party candidate Tom King began a 31 year career as a Member of Parliament, winning the by-election with 55 percent of the votes cast.
- At the annual Geneva Motor Show in Switzerland, Citroën introduced the Citroën-Maserati SM, at the time the fastest (170 miles per hour (270 km/h) speed) front-wheel drive in the world

== March 13, 1970 (Friday) ==
- The sinking of the Iranian ship Viaqtar killed 105 of the 180 people on board. The ship, bringing Muslims back to Iran after their pilgrimage to Mecca, capsized and sank off of the coast of Abu Dhabi.

== March 14, 1970 (Saturday) ==
- The U.S. merchant vessel SS Columbia Eagle was seized by two members of the crew in a mutiny while transporting bombs to the Thailand port of Sattahip. Armed with pistols, Clyde McKay Jr. and Alvin Glatkowski threatened the captain and the rest of the crew of the ship by claiming that they were prepared to detonate one of the bombs in the cargo. Twenty-four men evacuated in lifeboats and McKay and Glatkowski then forced the remaining 13 crew to pilot the vessel to Cambodia. The new government of Cambodia permitted Columbia eagle to leave on April 8, and imprisoned McKay and Glatkowski for extradition to the United States.
- An explosion at a Yugoslavian coal mine in Breza (now in Bosnia) killed 48 workers
- Born: Meredith Salenger, American film actress and winner of Young Artist Award at age 15 for the title role in The Journey of Natty Gann; in Malibu, California

== March 15, 1970 (Sunday) ==
- The Expo '70 World's Fair opened in Suita, a suburb of the Japanese city of Osaka

== March 16, 1970 (Monday) ==
- The New English Bible, an updated translation, went on sale worldwide after the completion of translation of the Old Testament. Rather than making a revision of previous English versions, a team of Biblical scholars worked from Hebrew language texts, and the publishers of the universities at Oxford and Cambridge stated that the new version was "as truthful as human skill could make it— and carried out by the best scholars and translators that the churches possessed". The release came a little more than nine years after the release of the NEB New Testament translation on March 14, 1961.
- Opposition in the U.S. Senate, to the nomination of Judge G. Harrold Carswell to the United States Supreme Court, grew after U.S. Senate hearings revealed that more than half of the rulings written by Carswell had been reversed on appeal for legal errors. U.S. Senator Roman Hruska of Nebraska defended Carswell's lack of qualifications, commenting that "even if he were mediocre, there are a lot of mediocre judges and people and lawyers. Aren't they entitled to a little representation and a little chance?" Carswell's nomination would fail to win the approval of the U.S. Senate in the vote taken on April 8.
- Voters elected overwhelmingly (747 to 131) to incorporate Gary, West Virginia, as a city, more than 60 years after the United States Steel Corporation had built the McDowell County settlement as a company town for its coal miners and their families. In addition to the former corporate-owned property, the new city included other coal mining towns such as Venus, Wilcoe, Thorpe, Ream, Filbert, Leslie and Elbert, another town named for U.S. Steel founder Elbert H. Gary.
- Born:
  - Oleg Pavlov, Russian novelist and winner of the Russian Booker Prize for 1994's Captain of the Steppe (died of a heart attack, 2018)
  - Paul Oscar (stage name for Páll Óskar Hjálmtýsson), Icelandic pop music singer and gay rights activist; in Reykjavík
- Died: Tammi Terrell (stage name for Thomasina Montgomery), 24, African-American R & B singer, from a brain tumor

== March 17, 1970 (Tuesday) ==
- A passenger on Eastern Air Lines Shuttle Flight 1320 killed the co-pilot and seriously wounded the pilot after entering the cockpit of the DC-9 in mid-flight. Robert Wilbur, Jr. was able to safely land the jet despite being wounded. His first officer, James E. Hartley, was fatally shot in the chest but was able to wrest the gun away and shoot the assailant, John J. Divivo, during the struggle after the shooting began. Carrying 68 passengers and a crew of five, the shuttle was making its approach to Boston on its flight from Newark, New Jersey. Shortly after 8:00 in the evening, Divivo forced his way into the cabin with a .38 caliber revolver and ordered the crew to "fly east", then panicked and began shooting when Wilbur told him that the plane would have to land in Boston to refuel.
- For the first time in its 24 year history of being a member of the United Nations Security Council, the United States used its veto power. The original version of Resolution 277 would have prohibited UN member nations from having any communications with Rhodesia, and had the support of 9 of the 15 members of the Security Council, but under UN rules, a no vote by any of the five permanent members (the U.S., the UK, the USSR, France and China) overruled the majority. The United Kingdom's no vote marked only the fifth time that the UK had cast a veto.
- The United States Army charged 14 of its officers (including two generals) with suppressing information about the 1968 My Lai Massacre in South Vietnam, and referred charges for court martial. Charges would later be dropped against Major General Samuel W. Koster (who would be demoted to the rank of brigadier general) and against Brigadier General George H. Young, Jr.; Colonel Oran Henderson would be tried and acquitted reassigned after a court-martial. Lieutenant William L. Calley Jr. would be the only one of the officers to be tried and convicted.

== March 18, 1970 (Wednesday) ==
- General Lon Nol, the Prime Minister of the Kingdom of Cambodia, ousted Prince Norodom Sihanouk, who was out of the country on a visit to Moscow. The nation's official head of state, Sihanouk's mother Queen Sisowath Kossamak, was placed under house arrest. The National Assembly then voted to approve the ouster. Lon Nol then prepared to abolish the monarchy in the southeast Asian nation and to declare the Khmer Republic with himself as President.
- United States Post Office Department workers walked out on strike in New York City. after carriers in the Bronx and Manhattan voted 1,555 to 1,055 the day before in favor of not delivering the mail. The strike quickly spread to other cities across the nation, including Chicago, Los Angeles, Philadelphia, Washington, Detroit, Boston, and San Francisco; Philadelphia, Chicago, Boston, and Denver. Ultimately, 210,000 of the 750,000 U.S. postal workers temporarily refused to work. U.S. President Nixon responded by assigning military units to sort and deliver the mail in New York City, and the strike was over within two weeks.
- Born: Queen Latifah, American rapper, singer and actress, as Dana Elaine Owens in Newark, New Jersey
- Died: William Beaudine, 78, prolific American film and television director with at least 350 films and hundreds of television show episodes from 1915 to 1966

== March 19, 1970 (Thursday) ==
- Willy Brandt became the first Chancellor of West Germany to visit East Germany (DDR), arriving in the city of Erfurt, 32 miles (51 km) from the border of the two nations, to meet with Willi Stoph, the Ministerpräsidenten (Chairman of the East German Council of Ministers, equivalent to Prime Minister). Enthusiastic East German crowds cheered Brandt along the route as he traveled across the border between Hesse and the Erfurt District in what is now Thuringia. The Erfurt Summit marked the first meeting between the heads of government of divided Germany since Brandt began the Ostpolitik policy of dialogue with the Communists. Brandt rejected Stoph's demand for recognition of the Communist DDR, but the leaders agreed that Stoph would travel to Kassel in West Germany on May 21.
- The first issue of the humor magazine National Lampoon, dated April 1970, went on sale at newsstands after having been founded by Harvard University graduates Douglas Kenney, Henry Beard and Rob Hoffman, who had worked as publishers of the Harvard Lampoon. The magazine, which would franchise popular comedy films and media, would be printed monthly until 1998.

== March 20, 1970 (Friday) ==
- Twenty-one people were killed, and 15 injured by an arsonist who set fire to the Ozark Hotel in Seattle, Washington. Most of the victims, all of whom had been staying on the fourth and fifth floors, died from burns or from smoke inhalation, but one victim fell five stories to her death from a fire escape. The perpetrator, who had splashed a flammable liquid in the hotel's stairwells, was never found.
- The Agency for Cultural and Technical Co-operation (ACCT) (Agence de Coopération Culturelle et Technique) was founded in Canada.
- Born:
  - Linda Larkin, American actress who supplied the voice for Princess Jasmine in Disney's Aladdin and its sequels; in Los Angeles
  - Bernhard Hoëcker, German comedian, in Neustadt an der Weinstraße, Rheinland-Pfalz, West Germany

== March 21, 1970 (Saturday) ==
- The UCLA Bruins defeated the Jacksonville University Dolphins, 80 to 69, to win the NCAA basketball championship.
- Cornell University won the NCAA Ice Hockey Championship by defeating Clarkson University, 6 to 4, in the finals at Lake Placid, New York. Cornell became the first, and only, American college ice hockey team to have a perfect record, finishing with 29 wins, no losses and no ties.
- The first Earth Day proclamation was issued by San Francisco Mayor Joseph Alioto, in advance of the larger event to be held nationwide on April 22.
- Born: Jaya (stage name for Maria Luisa Ramsey), Philippine pop music singer; in Manila

== March 22, 1970 (Sunday) ==
- The United States first used the BLU-82 bomb in combat, dropping the most powerful conventional weapon up to that time on North Vietnamese Army and Pathet Lao guerrilla troops in Long Tieng in Laos. The 15,000 lb (6,800 kg) bomb, nicknamed the "Daisy Cutter", had originally been designed to clear jungles to create landing zones for helicopters because it could clear an area within a radius of 300 feet (91 m) without leaving a bomb crater.
- Born: Leontien van Moorsel, Netherlands cyclist, gold medalist at the 2000 and 2004 Olympics and multiple women's world championships; in Boekel

== March 23, 1970 (Monday) ==
- U.S. President Nixon declared the nationwide walkout of postal workers to be a national emergency, and ordered the first of 2,500 United States troops to begin sorting and moving six days worth of undelivered mail. Busloads U.S. Air Force members arrived in New York City and began work that evening in the General Post Office in Manhattan, a second office serving the Wall Street financial district, and the main subdivision serving Brooklyn. The U.S. Department of Defense announced that 30,000 members of the Air Force, Army and Navy had been placed on alert, and called 12,000 from the 42nd Infantry Division of the multi-state U.S. Army National Guard to active duty, along with 15,5000 reservists. At the peak of the strike, 627 American post offices had had work stoppages
- Died: Skull Murphy (ring name for John Joseph Murphy), 39, Canadian professional wrestler, committed suicide shortly before he was scheduled for a bout in Charlotte, North Carolina

== March 24, 1970 (Tuesday) ==
- Buddy Baker (Elzie Baker, Jr.) became the first stock car racing driver to drive faster than 200 miles per hour on a race course. Baker was preparing for NASCAR's inaugural Alabama 500 race at Talladega when he drove a lap on the 2.66 mi (4.28 km) track in less than 48 seconds, averaging 200.447 miles per hour (322.588 km/h)
- Born: Lara Flynn Boyle, American television and film actress, in Davenport, Iowa

== March 25, 1970 (Wednesday) ==
- The first strike by post office workers in U.S. history came to an end, two days after President Nixon had called out the nation's military forces to sort and deliver the mail. During the eight day strike, 35,000,000 packages, letters and postcards had accumulated in New York City alone
- Born: Oh Hyun-kyung, South Korean actress, in Seoul
- Died: Xu Haidong, 69, Chinese military officer and Senior General of the People's Liberation Army, died six months after being purged from the Chinese Communist Party and exiled during the Cultural Revolution

== March 26, 1970 (Thursday) ==
- North Vietnam refused an offer by South Vietnam for the release and repatriation of 343 wounded or ill prisoners of war, declaring that there were no members of the North Vietnamese Army in the south. The Hanoi representatives at the Paris Peace Talks asserted that the captives were, instead, "illegally arrested patriots" from among South Vietnamese citizens rebelling against the Saigon government.
- Born: Luis Jimenez, Puerto Rican American comedian and host of one of the most popular Spanish language radio programs in the United States, The Luis Jimenez Show.
- Died: Patricia Ellis, 51, American film leading lady of the late 1930s; from cancer

== March 27, 1970 (Friday) ==
- In the largest air battle in the Middle East since the end of the 1967 Six-Day War, approximately 80 jets fought in the skies over the Port Suez, with 40 Egyptian MiG fighters and 40 Israeli Air Force Phantom jets. The Israeli fighters returned home safely, and reported shooting down five of the Egyptian MiGs.
- The American labor union PATCO Professional Air Traffic Controllers Organization, unable to call a strike without violating federal law, staged a "sick-out", with roughly one out of every four members telephoning to report that they would not be able to come to work because of illness. The shortage of workers to track airplane movement resulted in the cancellation of 250 scheduled airline flights on Good Friday, the first day of the busy Easter weekend.
- Born:
  - Elizabeth Mitchell, American TV and film actress; in Los Angeles
  - Maribel Díaz Cabello, First Lady of Peru from 2018 to 2020 until the impeachment of her husband Peruvian President Martín Vizcarra; in Moquegua
  - Princess Leila Pahlavi, the youngest child of the Shah of Iran and a member of Iranian royalty until the 1979 Iranian Revolution; in Tehran (died of drug overdose, 2001)

== March 28, 1970 (Saturday) ==
- A 7.2 magnitude earthquake struck western Turkey at 11:02 p.m. local time (21:02 UTC) and killed 1,086 people, most of them in the town of Gediz. The town, which had been damaged by earthquakes in the past, would later be relocated to safer ground 7 kilometres (4.3 mi) southwest of its prior location.
- Voting in the civilian presidential election in Dahomey (now Benin) was halted after 20 days by the incumbent president, Lieutenant Colonel Paul-Émile de Souza. The election had been held "in one province at a time" in Dahomey's six departments since March 9, with 97% of the votes being split geographically among three candidates. On May 1, de Souza declared all three candidates as winners, taking turns as president as part of a three-man presidential council.
- Britain completed the withdrawal of troops from Libya, as the last 390 Royal Air Force and British Army personnel left the base at RAF El Adem and departed in two naval transports from Tobruk. The RAF Tobruk base had been handed over to Libyan control on March 25.
- On the same day, Britain gave Malaysia ownership of the Terendak Camp, near Malacca, that had served as the base for the 28th Commonwealth Infantry Brigade Group of the armies of the United Kingdom, Australia and New Zealand.
- Two members of the Weathermen, an American terrorist group, were killed when a pipe bomb they had constructed exploded prematurely. Ishmael Brown and Bernard Godwin, both students at City University of New York, were in their sixth-floor apartment in New York City when Brown accidentally dropped the pipe after it had been loaded with dynamite and a detonator. Godwin, who lost three limbs in the blast, was indicted on March 29 while still in intensive care, but later died at the Bellevue Hospital. Police found three more live bombs and concluded that the Weathermen had planned to place them at a dance hall in New Jersey, where members of the U.S. military were scheduled to gather.
- Born: Vince Vaughn, American actor and comedian, in Minneapolis
- Died:
  - Fortune Gallo, 91, Italian-born opera impresario and manager of the touring San Carlo Opera Company
  - Lon Nil, Cambodian government official and the brother of Prime Minister Lon Nol, was captured by angry residents of the Kampong Cham Province and beaten to death in the town square at the village of Tonle Bet. According to witnesses at the scene, Lon Nil's liver was cut from his body, cooked, and served to the mob

== March 29, 1970 (Sunday) ==
- Eleven days after the overthrow of Prince Sihanouk, North Vietnamese Army forces invaded eastern Cambodia to assist the Cambodian Communist Khmer Rouge. The NVA would come within 15 miles (24 km) of taking the capital, Phnom Penh, before being pushed back in a counteroffensive.
- Died:
  - Vera Brittain, 76, English nurse and peace activist who wrote Testament of Youth
  - Brigadier General John Amadu Bangura, 40, Sierra Leone military officer who had led a coup in 1968 that placed Siaka Stevens in power, was executed for treason by Stevens.

== March 30, 1970 (Monday) ==
- The American soap opera Somerset premiered on NBC as a spin-off of the more popular daytime serial, Another World. The new show was originally called "Another World in Somerset", while the parent show was renamed "Another World in Bay City". On the same day, the ABC network premiered two of its own soap operas, the short-lived The Best of Everything and A World Apart.
- Born: Secretariat, American thoroughbred racehorse and Triple Crown winner in 1973; at the Meadow Stud farm in Doswell, Virginia (d. 1989)
- Died: Heinrich Brüning, 84, Chancellor of Germany 1930 to 1932 during the Weimar Republic era

== March 31, 1970 (Tuesday) ==
- After 12 years in orbit, Explorer I, the first American satellite, reentered Earth's atmosphere and burned up during its plunge to earth. Launched on January 31, 1958, Explorer I made 58,376 revolutions around the Earth before re-entering the atmosphere over the South Pacific Ocean at 11:47 UTC.
- Japan Airlines Flight 351 was hijacked by the Japanese Red Army terrorist group, along with its 131 passengers and crew of seven, shortly after its takeoff from Tokyo on a flight to Fukuoka, and ordered to fly to North Korea. The Army group released 22 of the passengers at Fukuoka, then demanded to be flown to North Korea with 100 others. South Korean authorities tricked the hijackers by permitting the Boeing 727 to land at the airfield in Kimpo, on the South Korean side of the Han River, and then sending out soldiers dressed in North Korean Army uniforms and placing propaganda signs at the airfield to give the illusion that the plane was at the North Korean capital of Pyongyang, a ploy that failed. The Red Army freed the rest of its captives on April 3 after Japan's Vice Minister of Transport volunteered to take their place, and flew onward to North Korea.
- West Germany's Ambassador to Guatemala, Karl von Spreti, was kidnapped in Guatemala City by members of the terrorist group Fuerzas Armadas Rebeldes ("Rebel Armed Forces"). Count von Spreti, a member of German nobility, was murdered by his captors five days later.
- With seven days left until the opening games of the 1970 Major League Baseball season, the Seattle Pilots were allowed by a referee in bankruptcy to sell the team to Milwaukee Brewers, Inc., a group of investors headed by future MLB Commissioner Bud Selig.
- Born: Alenka Bratušek, Prime Minister of Slovenia for 14 months from 2013 to 2014; in Celje, SR Slovenia, Yugoslavia
- Died:
  - Field Marshal Semyon Timoshenko, 75, Soviet Red Army general who led the abortive Second Battle of Kharkov during World War II
  - Sir George Wootten, 76, Australian Army general during World War II
