= April 1970 =

Month of 1970

<<	April 1970					>>
Su	Mo	Tu	We	Th	Fr	Sa
			1	2	3	4
5	6	7	8	9	10	11
12	13	14	15	16	17	18
19	20	21	22	23	24	25
26	27	28	29	30

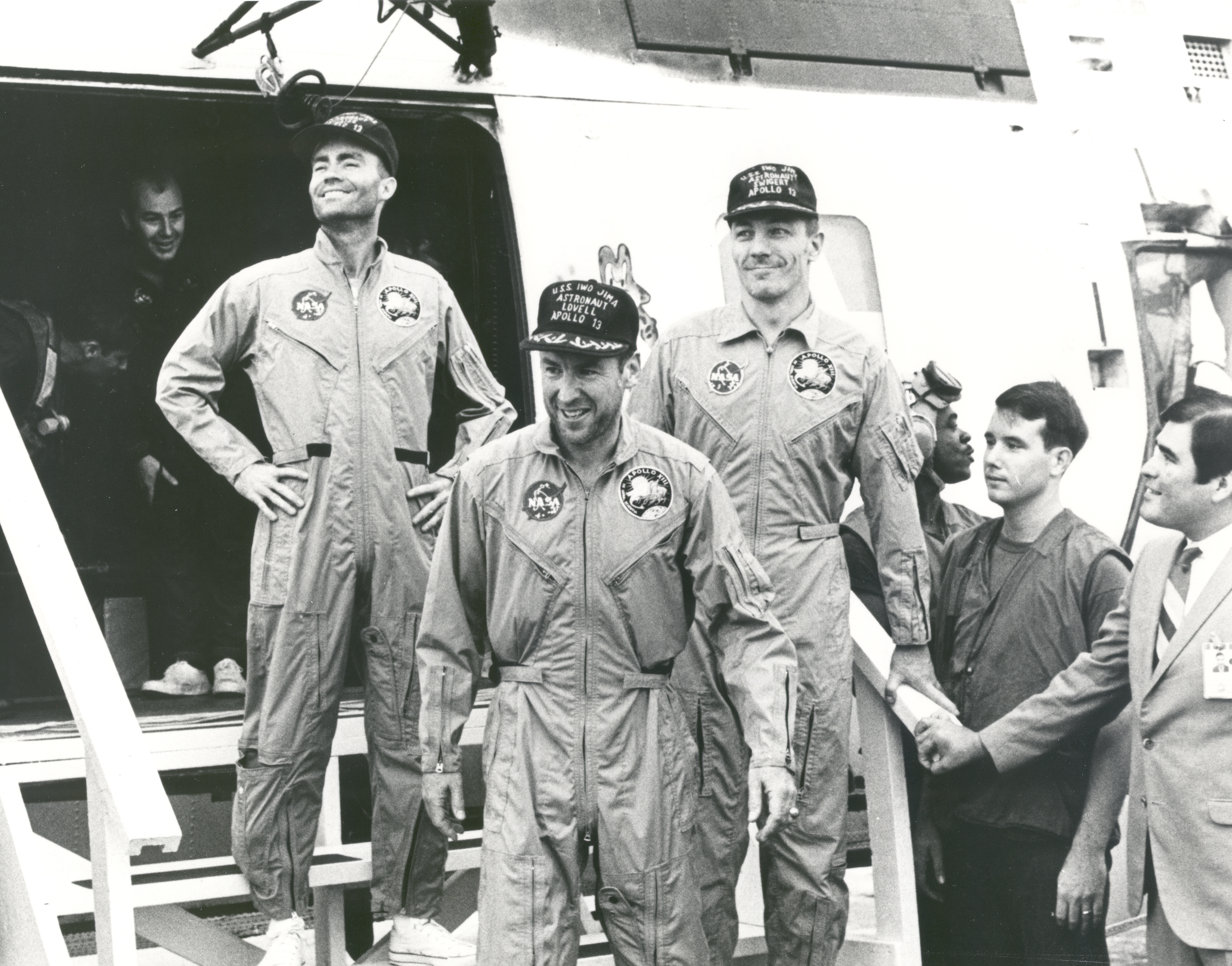
April 17, 1970: Apollo 13 astronauts safely return after near-catastrophe

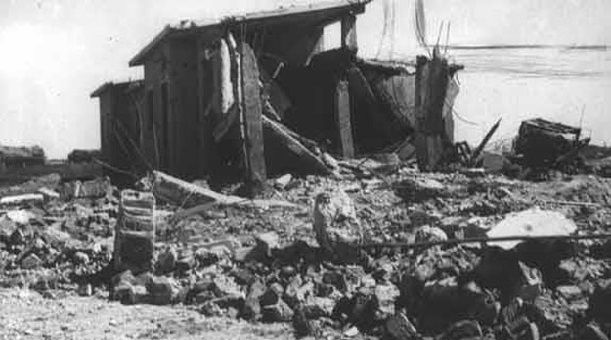
April 8, 1970: 34 children killed by Israeli air attack on Egyptian school

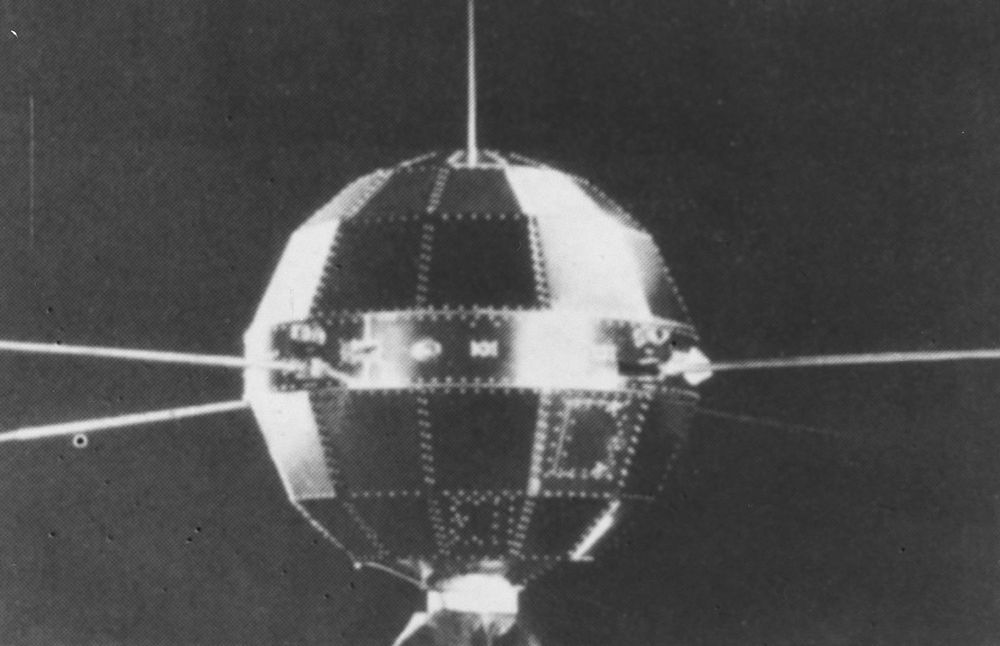
April 24, 1970: China launches its first orbital satellite

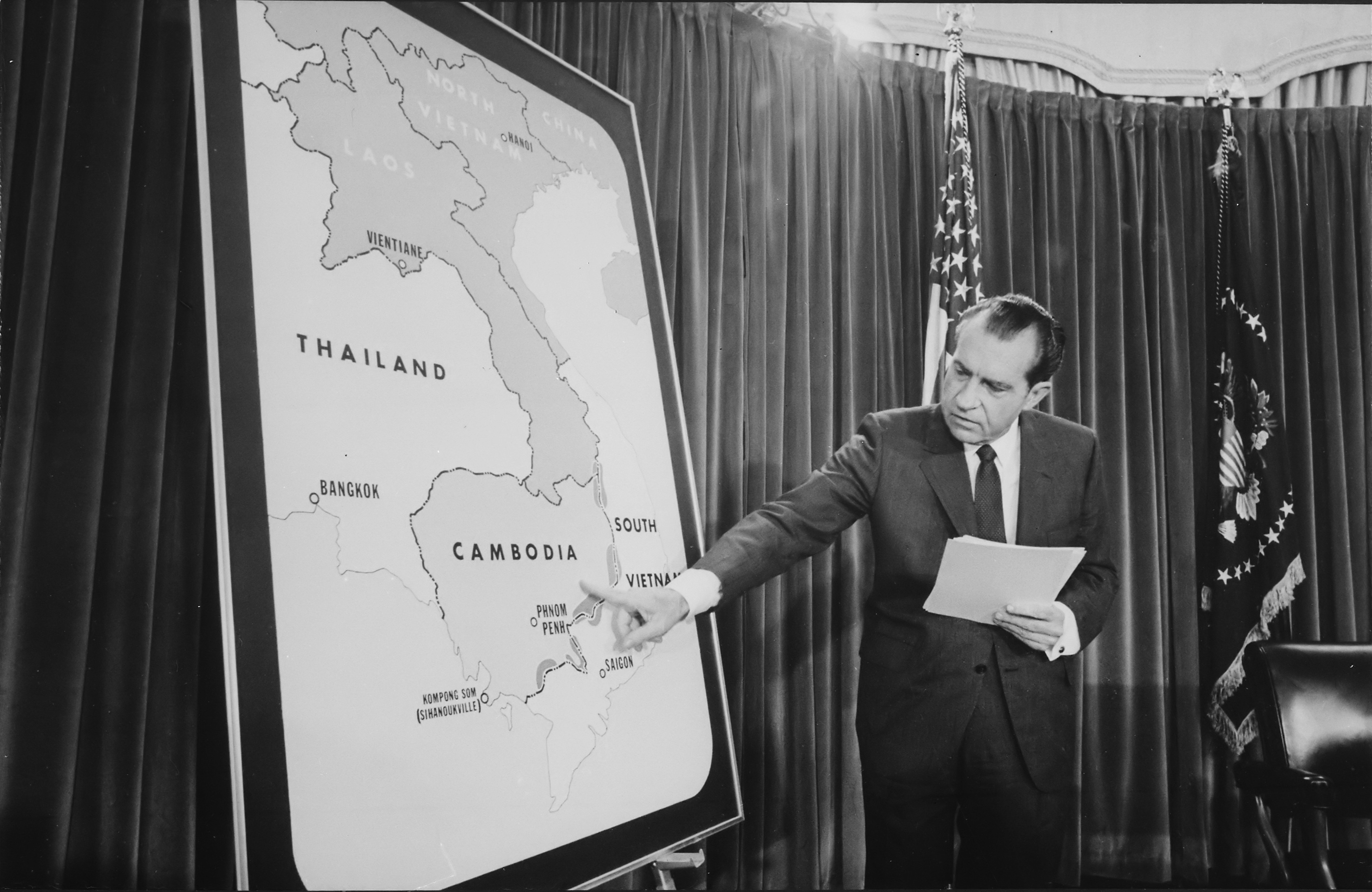
April 30, 1970: U.S. President Nixon announces that 2,000 U.S. troops have crossed into Cambodia, says "This is not an invasion."

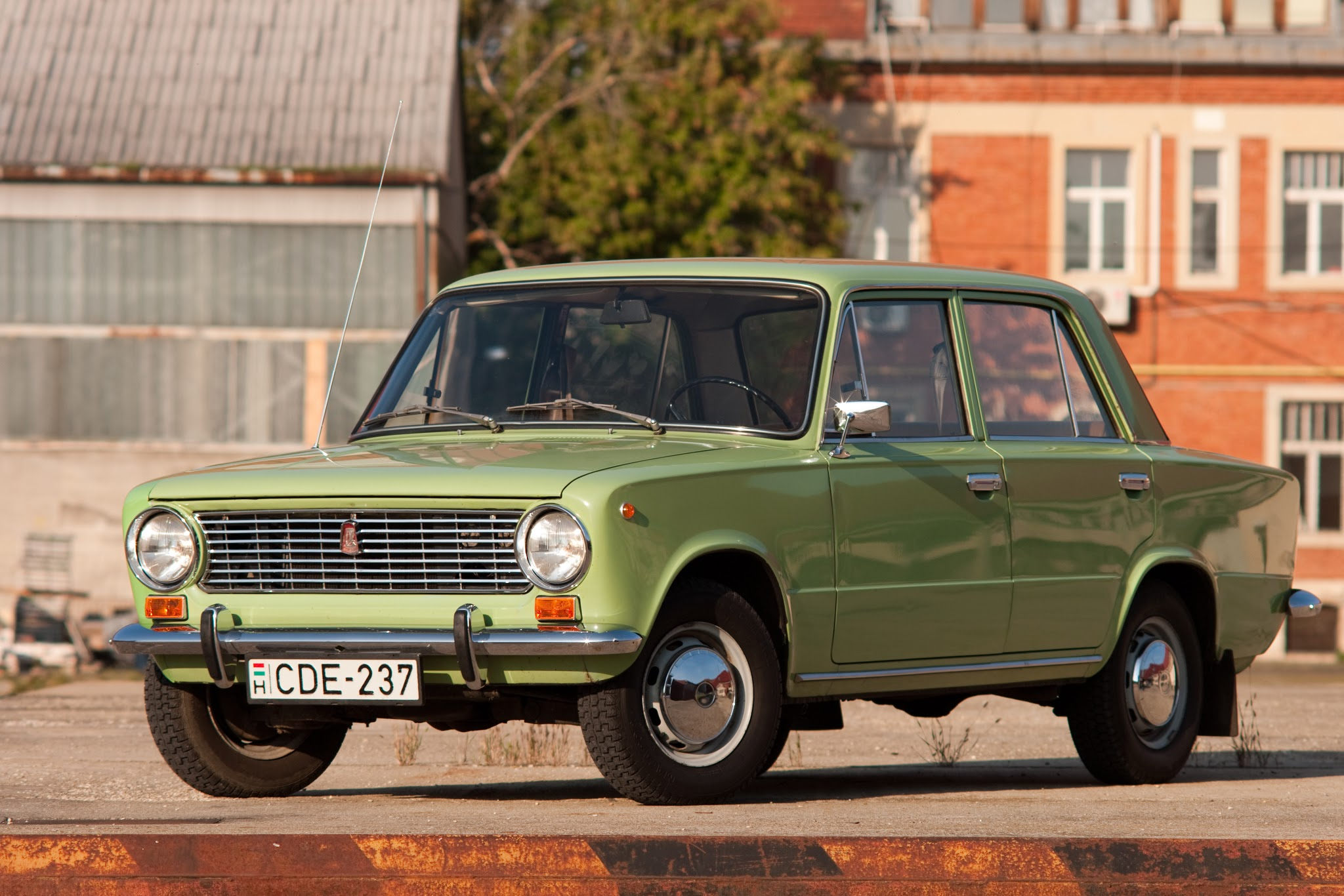
April 19, 1970: AvtoVAZ introduces the Lada

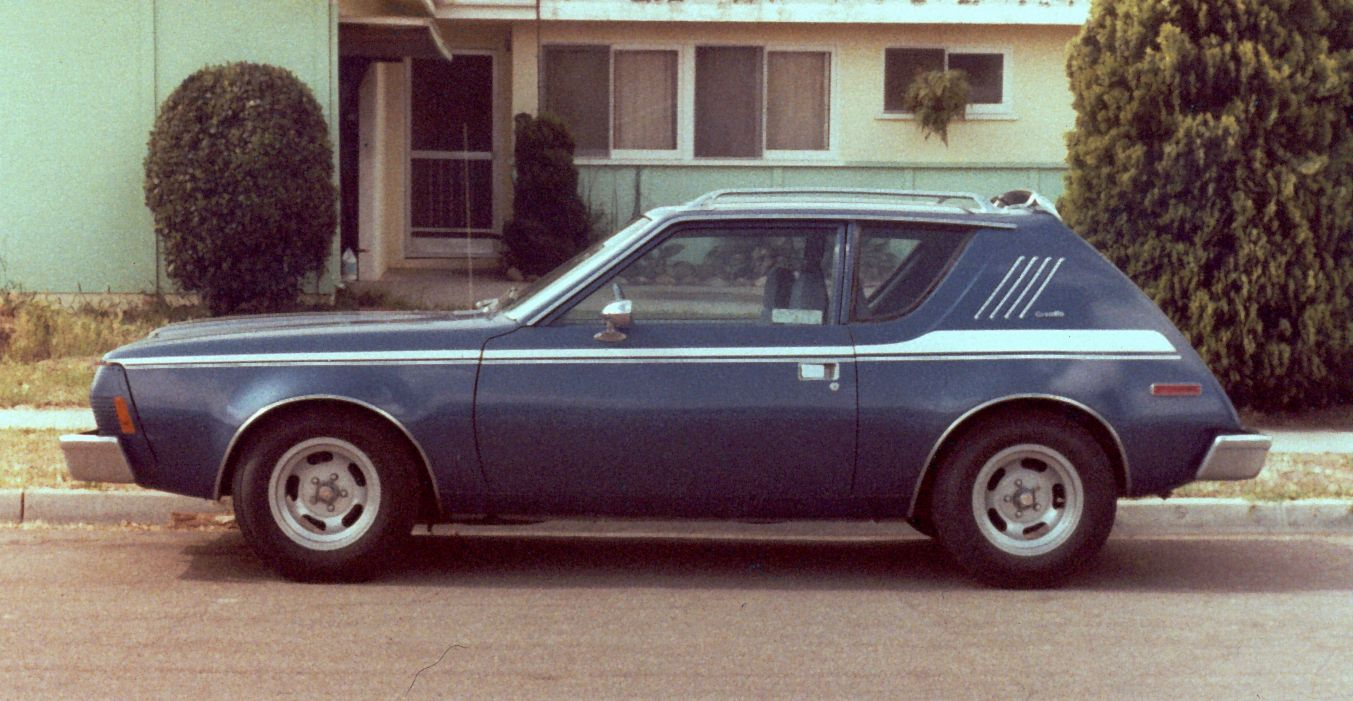
April 1, 1970: AMC introduces the Gremlin

The following events occurred in April 1970:

== April 1, 1970 (Wednesday) ==
- Sixty-one of the 82 persons aboard a Royal Air Maroc Caravelle twin-jet were killed when the aircraft crashed on its approach to Nouasseur Airport near Casablanca. The passengers were returning from the vacation resort of Agadir on a one-stop flight to Paris.
- All 45 people on Aeroflot Flight 1661 were killed after the plane collided with a weather balloon at an altitude of 5,400 metres (17,700 ft), severing the nose section and sending the plane into an uncontrollable descent. The Antonov An-24B had departed Novosibirsk 25 minutes earlier, at 3:42 a.m., and was bound for Krasnoyarsk.
- U.S. President Richard M. Nixon signed the Public Health Cigarette Smoking Act into law, banning cigarette television and radio advertisements in the United States effective January 2, 1971. The "one, big last day" on January 1 was permitted by Congress to allow television networks to get tobacco revenue for the college football bowl games on New Year's Day.
- American Motors Corporation (AMC) introduced the Gremlin.
- The 1970 United States census began to count on all people residing in the U.S.; the final tally was that there were 203,392,031 United States residents on April 1, 1970.
- Died: U.S. Army Brigadier General William R. Bond, 51, was shot and killed by a Viet Cong sniper, moments after stepping off of a helicopter to inspect a patrol in the Bình Thủy District of South Vietnam. General Bond, the commander of the 199th Infantry Brigade, became the highest ranking American officer (and the only U.S. general) to be killed in combat on the ground. Four other generals had been killed in aircraft crashes.

== April 2, 1970 (Thursday) ==
- Massachusetts became the first U.S. state to challenge the obligation of individual participation in the Vietnam War as unconstitutional, as Governor Francis W. Sargent signed the "War Bill" passed by both houses of the state legislature the day before. The measure, which passed 127 to 92 in the state House and 29 to 3 in the state Senate declared that no resident of Massachusetts "shall be required to serve outside of the territorial limits of the United States in the conduct of armed hostilities not an emergency and not otherwise authorized" by a declaration of war by the U.S. Congress.

== April 3, 1970 (Friday) ==
- In South Korea, the Japanese Red Army terrorist group accepted a proposal that Japan's Vice Minister for Transport, Shinjiro Yamamura, take the place of the remaining 100 passengers held captive on Japan Airlines Flight 351. The Boeing 727 jet had been hijacked 79 hours earlier while en route from Tokyo to Fukuoka, and the crew had landed at the Kimpo airfield outside of Seoul rather than acceding to the nine hijackers' demand that they be flown to North Korea. The jet then flew onward to the Pyongyang airport in North Korea with Yamamura and the crew of three. Yamamura and flight crew Shinji Isida, Teiichi Esaki and Toshio Aihara were allowed to fly the Boeing 727 from Pyongyang back to Tokyo the next day.
- Died: Faysal al-Shaabi, 31, Prime Minister of South Yemen during 1969 until being ousted in a coup, was "shot while trying to escape" a week after being transferred from house arrest to a government detention camp.

== April 4, 1970 (Saturday) ==
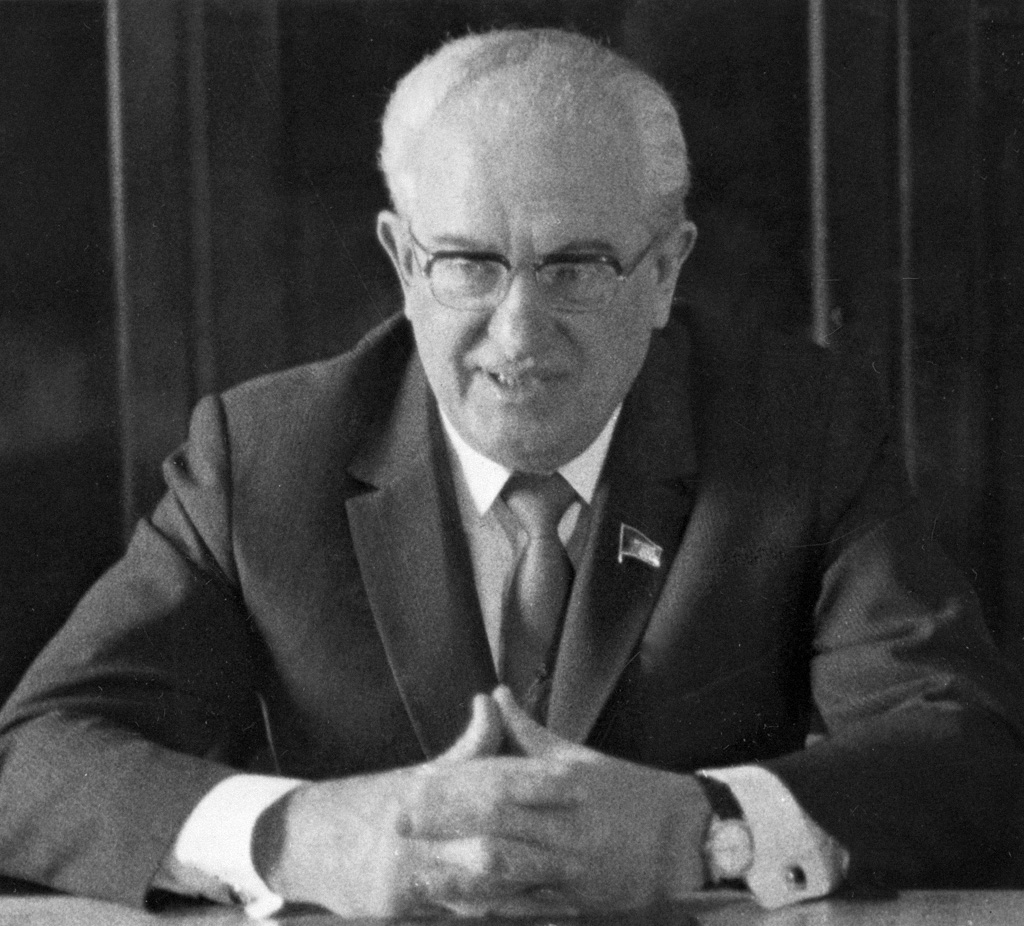
Yuri Andropov, KGB Chairman

- The disposal of the remains of Adolf Hitler was carried out at the Soviet Union's military base in Magdeburg, East Germany. Only the commander of the base was aware that the burnt skeletons of Hitler, Eva Braun, General Hans Krebs, Joseph Goebbels, Magda Goebbels and the Goebbels children, had been interred there. Hitler's skull had been sent to Moscow in 1945, where it was placed in the State Archives in Moscow. In that the base was scheduled to be relinquished to East Germany, the commander consulted KGB Director Yuri Andropov for instructions. To prevent the site from becoming a shrine for neo-Nazis, Andropov ordered that the grave's contents be crushed, burned and scattered. The process was completed the next day at Schönebeck, and what was left over was dumped into the Elbe River. In 1995, the long secret story would be revealed in the book The Death of Hitler: The Full Story with New Evidence from Secret Russian Archives, by Ada Petrova and Peter Watson.
- In what the Professional Bowlers Association would rank in a 2018 poll as its most dramatic game, Don Johnson had perfection until a frustrating final moment in winning the PBA Tournament of Champions. Johnson had bowled 11 consecutive strikes, but on the 12th and final frame, the "300 game" was foiled when only nine of the 10 pins fell. The #10 pin in the upper right corner remained, and although Johnson finished 299 to 268 ahead of his closest challenger, Dick Ritger, the failure to reach 300 cost him a $10,000 bonus and a new car.
- The 222nd and last original episode of the rural situation comedy Petticoat Junction was telecast, bringing an end to the show after seven seasons that began on September 24, 1963.
- A group of 50,000 demonstrators picketed in Washington for what has been called "the era's largest pro-war demonstration", the "March for Victory", organized by fundamentalist radio evangelist Carl McIntire. The marchers, mostly well-dressed, middle-aged white Americans, protested U.S. President Nixon's decision to reduce the American commitment rather than to take the war into North Vietnam.
- Citizens in the Stickney Township, west of Chicago, voted 4,071 to 1,552 to incorporate the new city of Burbank, Illinois. The Chicago Tribune noted that "The new city is bounded by 77th and 87th streets and Cicero and Sayre avenues and will have a population of about 30,000 residents."
- Born: Barry Pepper, Canadian film and Emmy Award-winning television actor; in Campbell River, British Columbia

== April 5, 1970 (Sunday) ==
- In order to prevent the court-ordered busing of students to achieve racial desegregation, Florida's Governor Claude Kirk issued an executive order appointing himself as the School Superintendent of Manatee County and suspending superintendent Jack Davidson and the rest of the school board, and then traveled to Bradenton the next day to order bus drivers not to comply with the orders of U.S. District Judge Ben Krentzman. Kirk reversed himself the following Sunday, after Judge Krentzman ruled that he was in contempt of court. Krentzman assessed a fine of $10,000 per day (equivalent to more than $66,500 a day fifty years later) to be paid personally by Governor Kirk for every day that he interfered with the court's orders.
- In the worst killing in California police history, four California Highway Patrol officers were shot and killed while confronting two armed suspects outside a restaurant in Newhall, California. Officers Walt Frago, Roger Gore, George Alleyn, and James Pence were all fatally wounded within four minutes before midnight after Frago and Gore had stopped a car driven by Bobby Davis. A passenger in the car, Jack Twinning, fired the first shots after Frago made his approach to the vehicle, and Gore was killed by Davis. The next day, Twinning killed himself after being cornered by police. Davis was arrested, and eventually hanged himself in prison, 39 years after the killings.
- Twenty-seven people were treated at the Memorial Hospital of California in Los Angeles for food poisoning after ingesting the hallucinogen LSD on potato chips served at a private party. The 27, eight of whom were admitted, were among 40 who were taken by the Los Angeles County sheriff's department after being called to the festivities at the South Bay Club, a "singles apartment" complex for unmarried people in Playa Del Rey, California, where 200 guests were attending a party for a departing tenant. One of the people identified as a guest would later be arrested and sentenced to six years to life in prison after pleading guilty.
- Died:
  - Alfred Sturtevant, 78, American geneticist known as the discoverer of genetic mapping
  - Karl von Spreti, 63, West Germany's ambassador to Guatemala, was murdered five days after he was kidnapped by the terrorist group Fuerzas Armadas Rebeldes ("Rebel Armed Forces"). The Guatemalan government refused FAR's demand that 22 FAR members be released from prison, along with the payment of US$700,000 in cash, and Spreti was killed by a single gunshot to his head.

== April 6, 1970 (Monday) ==
- BBC Radio 4 broadcast the first edition of its long-running evening news programme PM.
- Photojournalists Sean Flynn of Time magazine, and Dana Stone of CBS, crossed into Cambodia by motorcycle to report on the Vietnam War, and disappeared. Flynn, who was the son of actor Errol Flynn, and Stone were among five journalists who had crossed together for their assignments to take photos and film footage. Captured also were freelance photographer Claude Arpin of France, and two cameramen for Japan's Fuji Commercial Television, Yujiro Takagi and Akira Kusaka. The last time their colleagues saw them was when the men were waved through a roadblock set up by the North Vietnamese Army, which had used Cambodia as a base for operations. In 1986, the U.S. Defense Intelligence Agency would declassify a report that had concluded that Flynn and Stone "probably were executed in 1971 by an officer of the Khmer Rouge".

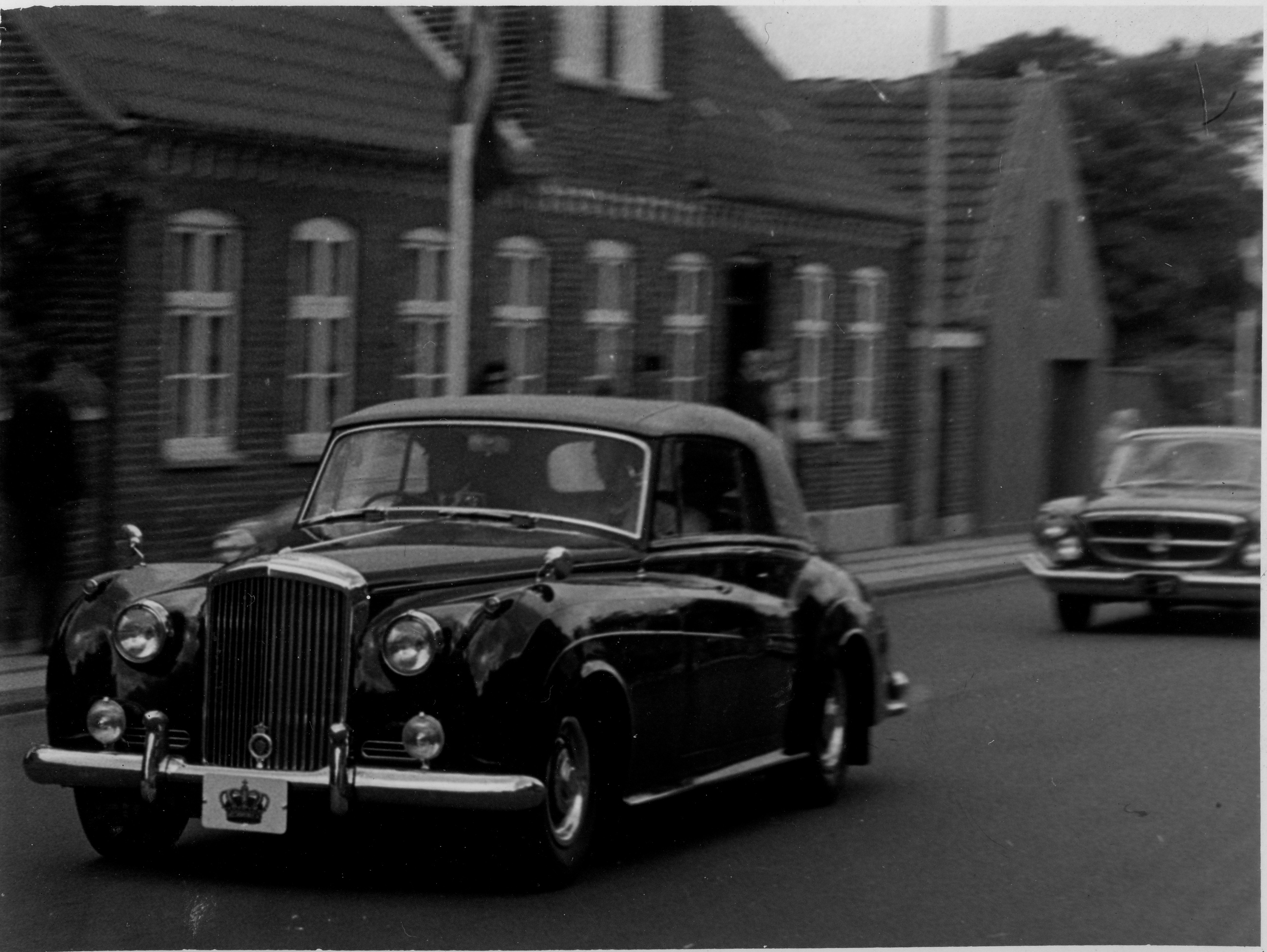
The King and his Bentley

- King Frederik IX of Denmark overturned his Bentley convertible automobile while driving on a Copenhagen street but was not seriously injured. After climbing out of his car, which skidded on a slippery street, hit the curb and landed on its side", the King rode part of the way back to the Amalienberg Palace in an ambulance, then asked the driver to stop, got out, and walked the rest of the way, "apparently wary that his arrival by ambulance might cause alarm."
- Died:
  - Dr. Sam Sheppard, 46, American neurosurgeon who had served 12 years in prison after being wrongfully convicted of murdering his wife; from encephalopathy associated with his consumption of alcohol.
  - El Deif Ahmed, 33, Egyptian comedian and film actor and part of the film trio Tholathy Adwa'a El Masrah; from a heart attack

== April 7, 1970 (Tuesday) ==
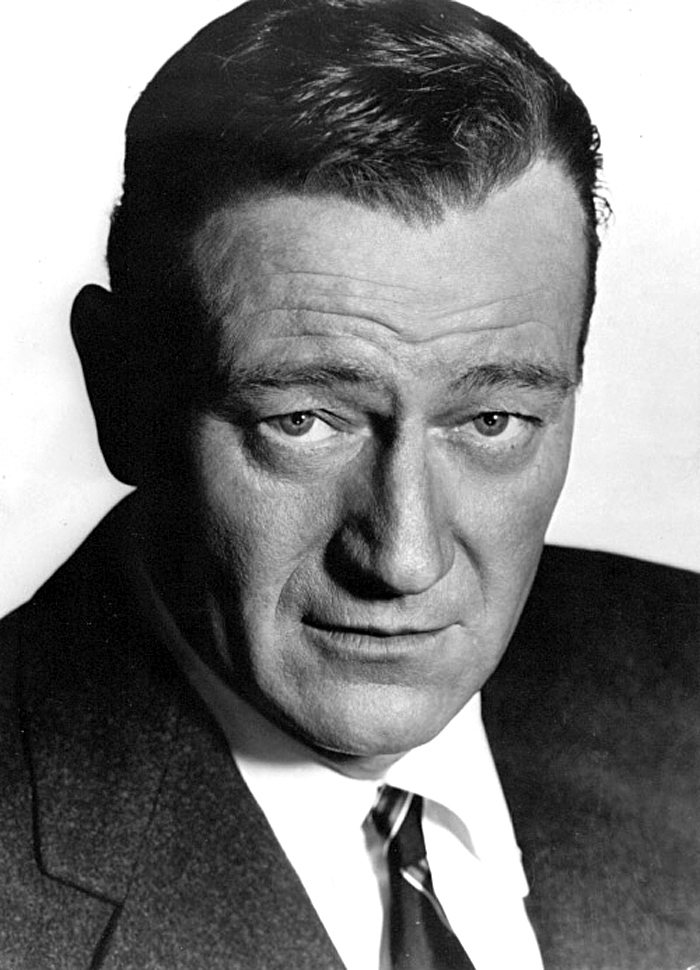
John Wayne

- The small town of McIntosh, Alabama, north of Mobile, was incorporated.
- Major League Baseball returned to Milwaukee, as the Milwaukee Brewers played their first game, only seven days after existing as the Seattle Pilots. Milwaukee's previous major team, the Milwaukee Braves, had played their final game on September 12, 1965, before relocating to Atlanta. The Brewers lost to the California Angels, 12 to 0, before a crowd of 36,107 at Milwaukee County Stadium.
- At the Academy Awards, Midnight Cowboy became the first (and to date, the only) X-rated film to receive the Oscar for Best Picture; John Schlesinger won Best Director. John Wayne received his first and only Oscar for Best Actor, for his performance as Rooster Cogburn in the western True Grit.

== April 8, 1970 (Wednesday) ==
- Thirty-four schoolchildren in Egypt were killed, and 42 wounded, when their elementary school was struck by air-to-ground missiles and bombs by F-4 Phantom II jets flown by the Israeli Air Force. The carnage near the city of Faqous, apparently caused by the IAF impression that the building was a military target, was a factor in the ending of Israel's Operation Priha five days later.
- A huge gas explosion at a subway construction site in Osaka, Japan killed 79 people and injured over 400. The explosions took place at about 5:30 p.m. during the evening rush hour.
- By a vote of 51 against and 45 in favor, the United States Senate rejected the nomination of G. Harold Carswell to become a justice on the United States Supreme Court.
- Born: Andrej Plenković, Prime Minister of Croatia since 2016; in Zagreb, SR Croatia, Yugoslavia
- Died:
  - Prince Felix of Bourbon-Parma, 76, Prince Consort of Luxembourg as the husband of the European nation's ruler, Grand Duchess Charlotte, from 1919 until her abdication in 1964
  - Julius Pokorny, 82, Austro-Hungarian born Swiss linguist; from injuries sustained after being struck by a train

== April 9, 1970 (Thursday) ==
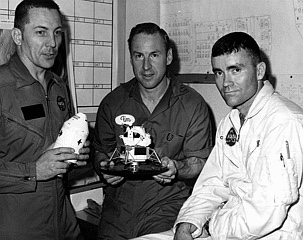
April 9, 1970: Jack Swigert, Jim Lovell and Fred Haise, the new crew of Apollo 13.

- Only two days before the scheduled liftoff of the Apollo 13 lunar mission, command module pilot Thomas K. Mattingly was removed from the crew and replaced by the backup CM pilot, John L. Swigert Jr. The alternative to lifting off on April 11 with a replacement crew member would have been to postpone the launch to the next favorable launch date, May 9. A pre-launch physical examination showed that Mattingly had contracted rubella (also called German measles) after exposure to the disease from another member of the backup crew, Charles M. Duke Jr. (who, in turn, had contracted the disease from one of his children).
- With the switch of one state legislator's vote from "no" to "yes", the New York State House of Representatives cleared the way for legalized abortion in that U.S. state. The State Senate had previously voted, 31 to 26, to pass an even more wide-reaching bill. With 150 members, the State House required at least 76 votes to approve a bill, and the initial roll call vote was 74 to 74, with the House Speaker declining to cast a vote. At that point, Assemblyman George M. Michaels stood up and, crying, told the group that he was changing his vote, adding that "I cannot go back to my family and say George Michaels killed this bill. I fully appreciate that this is the termination of my career." With the vote now 75 in favor, 73 against, Speaker Perry B. Duryea Jr. then added the 76th vote, clearing the way for abortions during the first 24 weeks of pregnancy. As Michaels had predicted, his yes vote did mean the end of his political career and he was never elected to another office.

== April 10, 1970 (Friday) ==
- With the page one headline "PAUL QUITS THE BEATLES", Britain's national daily tabloid newspaper, the Daily Mirror, broke the story that Paul McCartney was leaving The Beatles. McCartney's parting of ways with John Lennon, and bandmates George Harrison and Ringo Starr, effectively brought a permanent end to the most popular rock musician group in history. McCartney issued a press release later in the day in conjunction with promotional copies of his first album as a solo artist, McCartney.
- The Autocephalous Orthodox Church in America, the organization of several hundred Russian Orthodox congregations in the United States and Canada, was granted authority to conduct its own affairs (autocephaly) by Patriarch Alexius I and the 14 bishops of the Holy Synod of the Russian Orthodox Church. John Bekish, the Russian Orthodox Archbishop of New York and leader of the North American Russian Orthodox organization since 1965, became the 15th bishop of the Holy Synod as Ireney, Metropolitan of all America and Canada.
- Born:
  - Tim Houston, Canadian politician, Premier of Nova Scotia, in Halifax
  - Q-tip (stage name for Kamaal ibn John Fareed), American hip-hop rapper and producer; as Jonathan William Davis, in Harlem, New York City

== April 11, 1970 (Saturday) ==
The Baja California peninsula on April 11, 1970, taken with north oriented down during Apollo 13.

- Apollo 13, carrying astronauts Jim Lovell, Jack Swigert and Fred Haise, was launched from Cape Kennedy at 2:13 in the afternoon local time (13:13 Houston time, 19:13 UTC), with plans to make the third crewed landing on the Moon, which would have been the first to explore the lunar highlands. The center engine of the Saturn S-II stage shut down about 2 minutes and 12 seconds early, but this caused no flight control problems.
- Born: Trevor Linden, Canadian ice hockey player who had a 19-season career in the NHL; in Medicine Hat, Alberta
- Died: Cathy O'Donnell (stage name for Ann Steely), 46, American film actress; from cancer

== April 12, 1970 (Sunday) ==
- Seventeen people were killed and 40 injured near Roseworthy, South Australia, when a double-decker bus was driven at full speed into the path of a train. The driver, who was found to have been intoxicated, apparently did not see the Bluebird railcar train moving down the tracks, and the impact caused the bus to roll over, crushing the upper deck and the people inside.
- Fifty-two of the surviving 125 crewmen on the Soviet submarine K-8 died when the vessel was flooded with carbon monoxide as they were attempting to extinguish a fire. Four days earlier, eight other crew had been killed when they were sealed off inside sections of the sub during an effort to fight the blaze. The remaining crew had evacuated the sub, but then were ordered to go back inside while it was being towed. After 20 of the 24 nuclear weapons on board were removed, K-8 sank in the Bay of Biscay, 490 kilometres (300 mi) northwest of Spain, with 60 members of the Soviet Navy and four nuclear torpedoes, in waters 15,350 feet (4,680 m) deep.
- The first major NASCAR event in Alabama, the Alabama 500, was held at the Alabama International Motor Speedway in Talladega. Pete Hamilton, who had won the 1970 Daytona 500 two months earlier, won the Alabama race after leader Buddy Baker was forced out by a car wreck with 13 laps left.
- Born: Nick Hexum, American musician, frontman of 311, in Madison, Wisconsin

== April 13, 1970 (Monday) ==
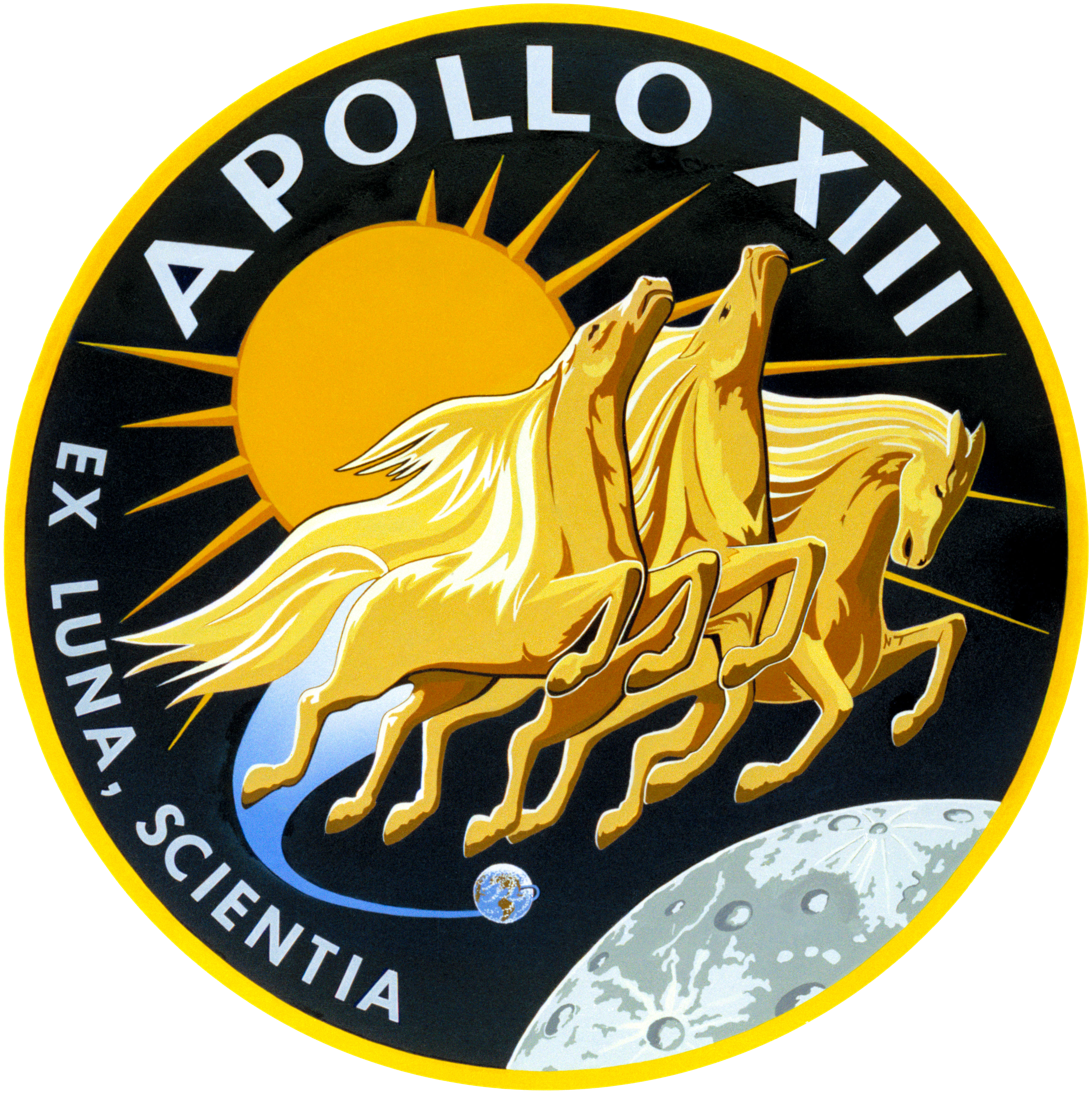
Apollo 13 patch

- At 9:08 in the evening Central Time (April 14 03:08 UTC), the Mission Control team at the Manned Spacecraft Center in Houston, Texas, received word from the Apollo 13 crew that an oxygen tank in the command module had exploded, and that electrical power was gradually dropping, an event that led to an abort of the planned lunar landing. The mission shifted to recalculation of the Apollo 13 route in hopes of getting the three astronauts safely back to Earth. Nine minutes after the crew had finished a 40-minute live broadcast to television viewers, astronaut Fred Haise began alerting with the words "Okay, Houston..." and Jim Lovell followed with "I believe we've had a problem here." When ground control asked him to repeat the statement, Lovell said, "Houston, we've had a problem." Twenty-five years later, the film Apollo 13 would have actor Tom Hanks, as Lovell, saying "Houston, we have a problem." The initial observation was an undervoltage in two of the power-producing cells. After 93 minutes, Haise reported that oxygen pressure in the command module was dropping, and by 10:59 p.m., Mission Control determined that the three SM fuel cells had failed, that only 15 minutes of electrical power remained, and that the crew should transfer immediately to the lunar module.
- In the village of Xom Bien, a massacre of about 600 ethnic Vietnamese residents of Cambodia was carried out by the Khmer National Army as part of a campaign by the government of Cambodian leader Lon Nol against the nation's Vietnamese-speaking minority. Shortly after midnight, troops entered the village, founded as a Roman Catholic mission on the waters of the Mekong River in the Chrouy Changvar area near Phnom Penh and removed the men and boys, placed them on Vietnamese Navy riverboats, and shot them. Days later, hundreds of the corpses of the victims (which included more from outside of Xom Bien) were seen floating down the Mekong along South Vietnam
- SS La Jenelle, an idle luxury cruise ship which had formerly been called SS Bahama Star, capsized in a storm as it sat at anchor in the harbor of Port Hueneme, California, and would remain tilted at a 45 degree angle for the next two years before dismantling began in 1972. While stranded in low waters, the ship was boarded by thrillseekers, and the jetty that its remains "created [is] one of the best surf spots in California".
- At the Masters Tournament in Augusta, Georgia, Billy Casper shot a 69 to defeat Gene Littler in an 18-hole playoff to win the championship.
- Born:
  - Ricky Schroder, American film and television child actor known for Silver Spoons; later at age 28 (as Rick Schroder), on NYPD Blue; in Brooklyn
  - Eduardo Capetillo, Mexican telenovela actor and pop singer; in Mexico City
- Died:
  - William H. Johnson, African-American expressionist painter
  - Merriman Smith, 57, American journalist and senior White House correspondent for United Press International, shot himself at his home
  - Hugh Francis Redmond, 50, American CIA agent who had been held captive in a prison camp in China since his arrest in 1951. China's news agency announced on July 10, 1970, that Redmond had slit his wrists with "a U.S.-made razor blade".

== April 14, 1970 (Tuesday) ==
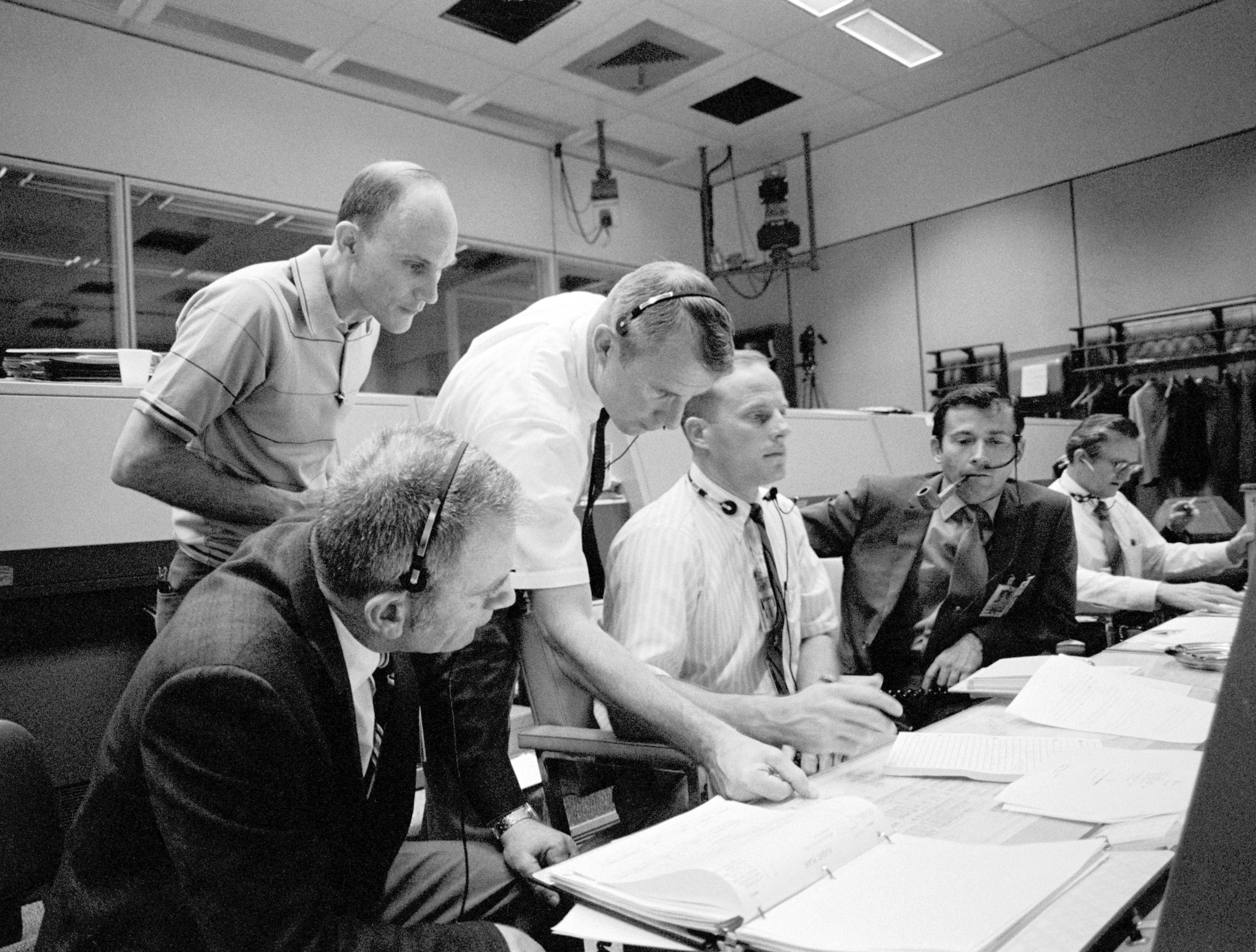
April 14, 1970: Fellow astronauts and flight controllers work to bring Apollo 13 crew home.

- U.S. President Nixon made his third nomination to replace the vacancy on the United States Supreme Court that had existed since the resignation of Abe Fortas. The new nominee, in the wake of the failure of Clement Haynsworth and G. Harrold Carswell to receive confirmation, was Judge Harry A. Blackmun Blackmun would be approved unanimously by the Senate only four weeks later.
- NASA canceled the scheduled landing of Apollo 13 on the Moon and began new calculations for a course that could swing the spacecraft around the Moon and then bring the command module and lunar module back to Earth. By 9:30 p.m. EST (0230 UTC 15 April), the ship had completed its circuit of the Moon and fired the engines to speed the spacecraft back toward the Earth.
- Born: Shizuka Kudo, Japanese actress and pop music singer with 11 number one hits on the Oricon Singles Chart; in Hamura, Tokyo

== April 15, 1970 (Wednesday) ==
- At 00:21 UTC (7:21 p.m. April 14 Eastern time), the crew of Apollo 13 was partway through its "slingshot maneuver" around the far side of the Moon, at an altitude of approximately 158 miles (254 km) above the lunar surface. At that point, astronauts Fred Haise, Jack Swigert, and Jim Lovell had set a record for the furthest distance that human beings had ever traveled away from the Earth. During that time, they were 248,655 miles (400,171 km) above the Earth.
- Born: Flex Alexander (stage name for Mark Alexander Knox), American actor and comedian; in Harlem, New York City
- Died: Roger Hagberg, 31, American pro football player and running back for the Oakland Raiders since 1965, was killed after being struck by a car in Lafayette, California. According to the witnesses, Hagberg was thrown from his auto and then "struck by one and possibly two other vehicles as he lay on the pavement and was dragged 150 feet." One witness said that after Hagberg's body was hit on the roadway, "The motorist got out of his car, looked at the body, then drove away."

== April 16, 1970 (Thursday) ==
- At 1:10 in the morning local time, an avalanche buried a sanatorium in the French Alps near Sallanches, killing 74 people. The avalanche, 600 ft (180 m) wide, swept down the Plateau d'Assy and struck the children's wing of the hospital and two nursing dormitories, with a 60 ft (18 m) wide wall of snow. Most of the dead were boys under the age of 15, who were asleep when the disaster struck.
- Two Protestant ministers with views regarding majority rule in Northern Ireland, were elected to the Stormont, the House of Commons of Northern Ireland. Reverend Ian Paisley and his assistant, Reverend William Beattie, both of the Unionist Party, defeated Labour candidates in a by-election to fill the vacancies.
- The National Basketball Players Association and its attorney and executive director, Larry Fleisher, filed an antitrust lawsuit to prevent a possible merger between the National Basketball Association (NBA) and the rival American Basketball Association (ABA), until a guarantee could be assured for free agency for the players of a merged league. Filed in the name of NBAPA President (and NBA point guard) Oscar Robertson against the 11 ABA and 17 NBA team owners, the lawsuit averred that a single 28-team league would prevent players from being able to negotiate with the highest bidder between the rival circuits. A partial merger would finally take place in 1976, after a court ruling to void the reserve clause in contracts that gave teams the first option to renew a player's contract, and an 18-team NBA would bring in four of the remaining ABA teams.
- Died: Richard Neutra, 78, Austrian-American architect

== April 17, 1970 (Friday) ==
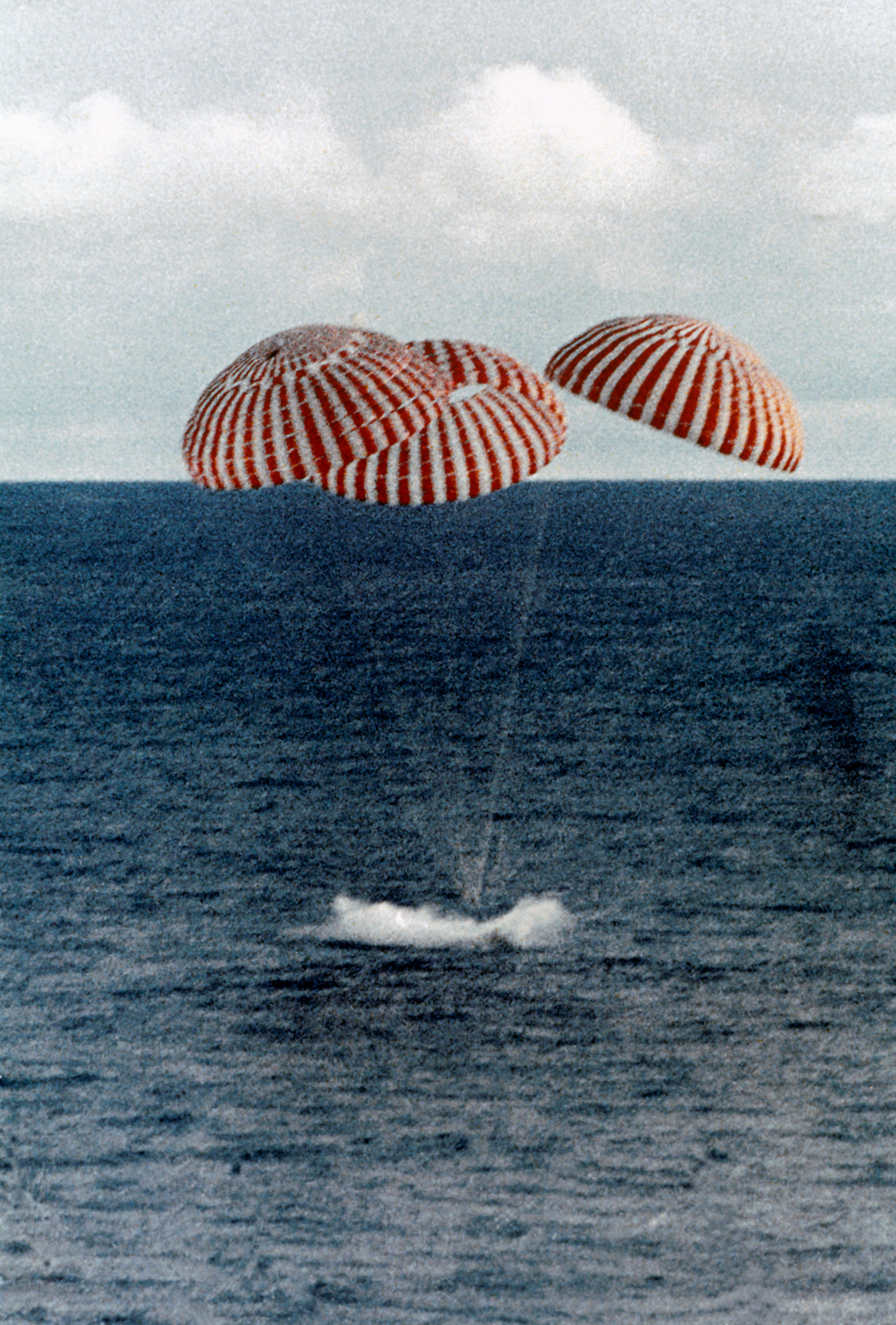
April 17, 1970: Splashdown of Apollo 13.

- Apollo 13 splashed down safely in the South Pacific Ocean near American Samoa, and was recovered by the amphibious assault ship USS Iwo Jima. Astronauts Jim Lovell, Jack Swigert and Fred Haise reported that they were exhausted because the intense cold during the return trip had prevented them from sleeping.
- Born: Redman (stage name for Reginald Noble), American rap artist; in Newark, New Jersey
- Died: Alexius I, Patriarch of Moscow and all of Russia (b. Sergei Vladimirovich Simansky), 92, Russian Orthodox cleric and the highest ranking religious leader authorized by the Soviet Union from 1945 until his death. He was succeeded on a temporary basis by the Metropolitan of Leningrad, Patriarch Pimen I, whose election would be made permanent in 1971.

== April 18, 1970 (Saturday) ==
- The day after their safe return to Earth following a near disaster in space, the three Apollo 13 astronauts were presented the Presidential Medal of Freedom by U.S. President Nixon at a ceremony in Honolulu. Jim Lovell, Fred Haise and Jack Swigert were told by Nixon, "You did not reach the Moon but you reached the hearts of millions of people on Earth by what you did."
- Born:
  - Saad Hariri, Prime Minister of Lebanon from 2009 to 2011 and again from 2016 to 2020; as the son of Lebanese politician (and later Prime Minister) Rafic Hariri in Riyadh, Saudi Arabia
  - Heike Friedrich, East German swimmer who held the women's record for the 200m freestyle from 1986 to 1994; winner of two gold medals in the 1988 Summer Olympics and four in the 1986 world championships
- Died: Michał Kalecki, 70, Polish economist and neo-Marxian economics theorist

== April 19, 1970 (Sunday) ==
- Elections were held in Colombia for a new president and for the Senate and the Chamber of Representatives. Pursuant to an agreement that Colombia's Conservative Party and Liberal Party would alternate control of the presidency, all four of the candidates were from factions of the Conservative Party, and none won a majority. Misael Pastrana Borrero, formerly Colombia's ambassador to the United States, received 1,625,025 votes (40.7%) of those cast. His closest challenger, former President Gustavo Rojas Pinilla of the ANAPO (Alianza Nacional Popular, the National Popular Alliance) faction, had 1,561,468 or 39.1% of the votes. Charging fraud, Rojas Pinilla threatened to capture the presidency by force (as he had done in a 1953 military coup) and President Carlos Lleras Restrepo placed the country under martial law the next day

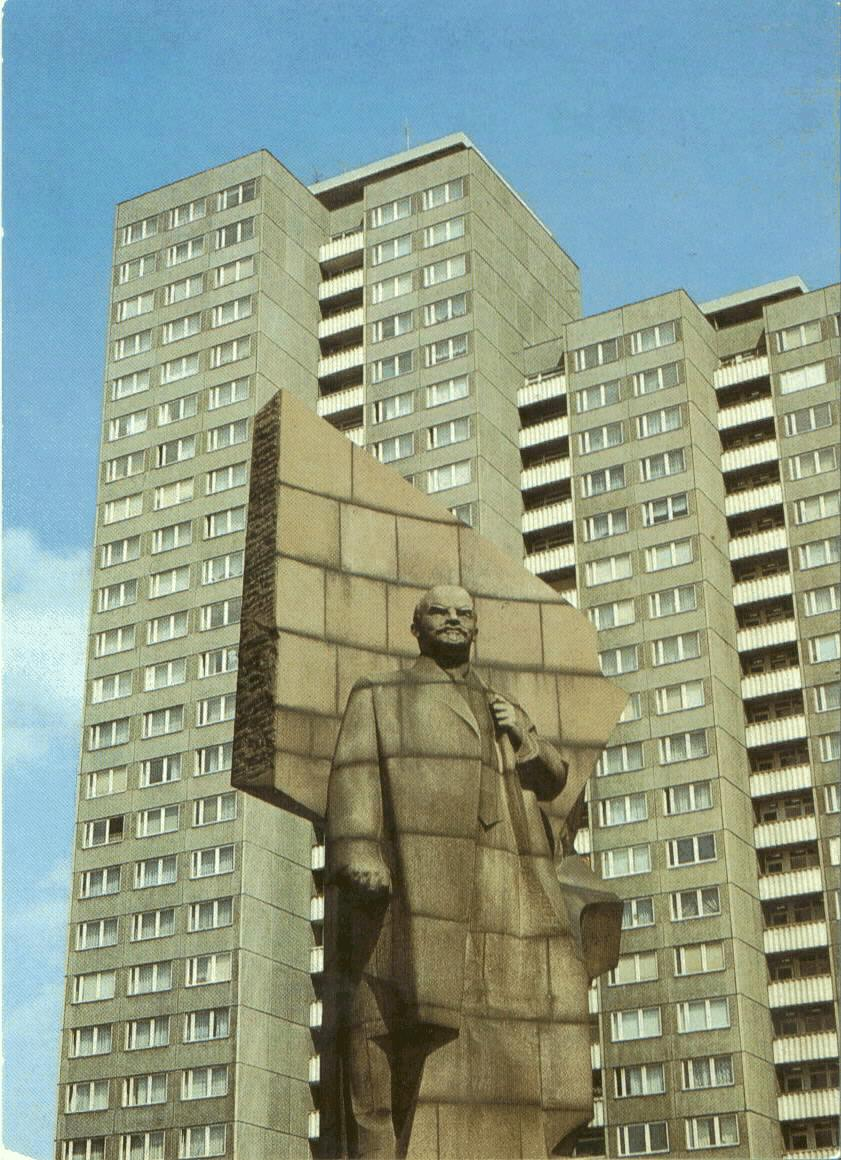
East Berlin's Lenin Monument

- In advance of the centennial of the April 22, 1870 birth of Vladimir Lenin, a 62 ft (19 m) high statue of the father of Communism, Lenin, was dedicated in East Berlin's Leninplatz. East Germany's Prime Minister and Communist Party general secretary, Walter Ulbricht, told a crowd of tens of thousands that the monument would remind Germans of the more than 300,000 Soviet soldiers who died in the battle for Berlin in 1945. The granite statue would be dismantled, removed and buried in 1992, after the reunification of Germany; the head would be unearthed in 2015 for a display in an exhibition.
- The first Lada compact car, the initial offering of the Soviet Union's AvtoVAZ automobile company, rolled off the assembly line of the Volga Automotive Plant in the city of Tolyatti, in the Russian SFSR. The original model, the VAZ-2101, was marketed in Eastern Europe as the "Zhiguli", and in the rest of the world as the "Lada 2101".
- The first intercontinental World Cup Rally (so called because the destination from London was the city where the quadrennial FIFA World Cup was scheduled) began at Wembley Stadium as 50,000 spectators watched the start of the 1970 London to Mexico World Cup Rally, sponsored by the London Daily Mirror tabloid. The 96 drivers (from 22 nations) drove through London and on to Dover to board the ferry across the English Channel to continental Europe, with a route going through Europe, Africa and South America before proceeding through Central America. The Ford Escort team of Finland's Hannu Mikkola and Sweden's Gunnar Palm arrived first in Mexico City, on May 27.
- Born: Luis Miguel (stage name for Luis Miguel Gallego), U.S.-born Mexican pop singer and one of the most successful recording artists in Latin American history; in San Juan, Puerto Rico

== April 20, 1970 (Monday) ==
- U.S. President Nixon announced that he would order the withdrawal of 150,000 American troops from South Vietnam over the next 12 months as part of the process of turning conduct of the Vietnam War over to the South Vietnamese people. Ten days after declaring that "The decision I have announced tonight means that we have in sight the just peace we are seeking", Nixon reversed the decision and announced that troop strength would not be decreased and that the war would expand into Cambodia. Hanoi and the Viet Cong had been given ample warning that they ran the risk of South Vietnamese and United States military action in Cambodia if they continued to mount attacks from neutral Cambodia as well as threatening the Lon Nol government.
- A new comic strip, Broom-Hilda, began its daily run in 69 American daily newspapers as one of the offerings of the Chicago Tribune Syndicate. Featuring a broom-riding witch as its title character, the strip is still drawn by cartoonist Russell Myers more than 49 years later. While Sunday, April 19, 1970, is sometimes listed as the date of the first strip, the appearance was limited to an advertisement in the Sunday comics section of the Chicago Tribune where Broom-Hilda told readers "My friends and I will be in the Tribune every day, starting tomorrow. Come and see us."
- The New York Knicks overwhelmed the Milwaukee Bucks, 132 to 96, to win Game 5 of a best-4-of-7 semifinal and to earn the right to face the Los Angeles Lakers in the National Basketball Association championship series. The Lakers had won the NBA's Western Division crown the day before against the Atlanta Hawks.
- Less than two weeks after the U.S. Senate declined to approve his nomination to the U.S. Supreme Court, G. Harrold Carswell resigned his lifetime appointment as a federal judge, apparently confident that he could win office as a United States Senator for Florida. Carswell failed to become the Republican Party nominee, losing by a wide margin in the September 8 primary to Congressman William C. Cramer.
- Born:
  - Adriano Moraes, Brazilian professional bull rider with four world titles in professional rodeo; in Quintana, São Paulo
  - Shemar Moore, American television actor known for The Young and the Restless; in Oakland

== April 21, 1970 (Tuesday) ==
- All 36 people on Philippine Airlines Flight 215 were killed in a crash caused by a bomb explosion in the aircraft's restroom at an altitude of 10,500 feet (3,200 m). The Hawker Siddeley HS-748 had departed from Cauayan on a 174 mi (280 km) flight to Manila.
- Leonard Casley, a disgruntled wheat farmer in the state of Western Australia, declared his 18,500-acre (7,500 ha) farm to be the "Hutt River Province", and would contend for the rest of his life that his 29 sq mi (75 km^{2}) of territory had seceded from Australia and was no longer subject to national or state laws. A little more than a year later, Casley began making money by arranging to have postage stamps printed for sale to collectors and tourists. Funded by tourism for his micronation, Casley began referring to himself as "Prince Leonard of Hutt River" and expanded to minting coins and printing currency. Casley died on February 13, 2019, two years after abdicating his throne to his son Graeme Casley.
- Born:
  - Rob Riggle, American comedian known for Saturday Night Live; also a Lieutenant Colonel in the U.S. Marines reserve; in Louisville, Kentucky
  - Nicole Sullivan, American comedian and actress known for MADtv and for The King of Queens; in Los Angeles

== April 22, 1970 (Wednesday) ==
- Earth Day was celebrated in the United States for the first time. The Associated Press reported the next day, "Across the nation, trash was gathered, streets swept, ponds and parks cleaned, trees and flowers planted" as "youth joined hands with age across the generation gap".
- In a secret meeting at the White House of his National Security Council, U.S. President Richard M. Nixon discussed the options for the United States response to the continuing use of Cambodia by the North Vietnamese Army and the Viet Cong as a base from which to launch attacks against American forces during the Vietnam War. Nixon's chief national security adviser, Henry Kissinger, would recount later that the three choices were to continue the current response, favored by Secretary of Defense Melvin Laird and Secretary of State William P. Rogers; providing financial and adviser aid to an invasion by South Vietnam's army without committing ground troops (favored by Kissinger); or sending U.S. troops and planes into Cambodia to attack Communist sanctuaries (favored by General Earle Wheeler, the Chairman of the Joint Chiefs of Staff). While Nixon supported Kissinger's option, U.S. Vice President Spiro T. Agnew made the argument for committing U.S. troops to Cambodia, the decision that Nixon ultimately adopted.
- A non-violent protest created Chicano Park in San Diego, California, when college student Mario Solis saw construction crews preparing to clear a popular gathering place to build a new California Highway Patrol station in a majority Hispanic-American section of the city, Barrio Logan. Much of the neighborhood had already been razed to build Interstate Highway 5 and the San Diego–Coronado Bridge. Solis quickly organized the occupation of the site by 300 neighborhood residents, and the city of San Diego and the state relented after a 12-day standoff, allowing the residents to build their own park
- Born: Regine Velasquez, best-selling Philippine singer and award-winning actress; in Manila

== April 23, 1970 (Thursday) ==
Andorra

- The tiny European co-principality of Andorra granted women the right to vote. The decree provided the franchise to 1,300 women in the nation, located in the Pyrenees on the border between Spain and France. It was signed by its joint heads of state, Spain's Bishop of Urgell (Joan Martí i Alanis) and by Martí's fellow co-prince, France's President Georges Pompidou. Women were still ineligible, however, to run for office.
- U.S. President Nixon issued an Executive Order ending any future deferment from the military draft based on occupation, agriculture or fatherhood.

== April 24, 1970 (Friday) ==
People's Republic of China

Republic of China

- The People's Republic of China became the sixth nation to launch a satellite into Earth orbit, as the spacecraft Dong Fang Hong 1 was sent up using the Changzheng-1 (CZ-1) rocket (named for the Long March). The 346 lb (157 kg) spacecraft, named for revolutionary song "The East Is Red", which it transmitted continuously while making an orbit of the Earth every 114 minutes.
- Chiang Ching-kuo, the future President of the Republic of China (on the island of Taiwan), was shot at by a would-be assassin as he entered the Plaza Hotel in New York City. A plainclothes officer of the New York City Police Department struck the assassin's arm and the deflected shot struck the hotel's revolving door as Chiang was preparing to enter. The shooter, Peter Huang Wen-hsiung, was a Ph.D. candidate at Cornell University. He and his brother-in-law, Cheng Tzu-tsai, were arrested at the scene. Chiang, the son, and eventual successor, of Taiwanese President Chiang Kai-shek was the Vice-Premier of the island republic at the time. Cheng and Huang fled the United States after being released on bail and, after Chiang Ching-kuo's 1988 passing, would return to Taiwan in 1996.
- The West African nation of Gambia became a republic shortly before midnight, after certification of the results of a four day long referendum; Gambian voters approved the measure by more than the required two-thirds needed under the former British colony's constitution, with 84,968 in favor and 35,638 against
- The 452nd and final episode of the American western anthology series Death Valley Days was shown on syndicated television, bringing an end to the program after 18 seasons. The series had been broadcast at different times by American television stations since October 1, 1952.

== April 25, 1970 (Saturday) ==
- A mutiny of the Trinidanian Army came to a peaceful end after five days, when the government of Trinidad and Tobago negotiated a surrender of the mutineers in return for amnesty. On Tuesday, soldiers in Chaguaramas had seized the Teteron Barracks in the small Caribbean nation.
- The U.S. Food and Drug Administration issued a warning, to 400,000 owners of the "Relaxacizor", that the machine, marketed as an electrical weight-loss device, could seriously injure or even kill its users because of its process of "exercising" specific muscles with electric shocks to stimulate muscle contraction. On April 14, a federal court had issued an injunction to the Eastwood General Corporation, prohibiting future sales unless the Relaxacisor was prescribed by a physician, but the order did not affect the units already sold.
- Born: Jason Lee, American actor, photographer, and former professional skateboarder, in Santa Ana, California
- Died: Anita Louise, 55, American film and television actress, died suddenly at her home of a stroke

== April 26, 1970 (Sunday) ==
- The Convention Establishing the World Intellectual Property Organization went into effect, a little less than three years after it had been adopted at Stockholm on July 14, 1967.
- Company, a Broadway musical with music and lyrics by Stephen Sondheim, began the first of 706 performances at the Alvin Theatre. It would win six Tony Awards, including best musical, best music and best lyrics.
- Born:
  - Melania Trump, Yugoslavian-born model and First Lady of the United States as the wife of U.S. President Donald Trump; as Melanija Knavs in Novo Mesto, SR Slovenia
  - T-Boz (stage name for Tionne Watkins), Grammy Award-winning American R & B singer; in Des Moines, Iowa
- Died:
  - Gypsy Rose Lee (stage name for Rose Hovick), 59, American striptease artist and mystery novelist; from lung cancer. In one obituary, she was celebrated as being an artist who "kept the crowd entertained and titillated without removing much more than her gloves". She was the inspiration for the Broadway musical Gypsy; her novel The G-String Murders was made into a film of the same name.
  - Francisco Cunha Leal, 81, Prime Minister of Portugal for seven weeks in 1920 and 1921

== April 27, 1970 (Monday) ==
- A five-member team of physicists at the Lawrence Berkeley Laboratory in Berkeley, California, led by Albert Ghiorso, reported that they had synthesized a new chemical element (now called Dubnium) number 105 on the periodic table At the same time, the California team disputed a 1968 report from a Soviet team at the Joint Institute for Nuclear Research in Dubna, outside of Moscow, that the Soviets had synthesized the element first. The IUPAC/IUPAP Joint Working Party, convened by the international unions of pure and applied chemistry and of physics, would later credit both teams with the discovery. Ghiorso's team had bombarded californium-249 (an isotope of element number 98) with ions of an isotope of nitrogen and concluded that it had created an isotope of 105.
- An unidentified 58-year-old woman became the first person to receive a heart pacemaker to be powered by an atomic battery, in a four-hour operation at the Hôpital Broussais in Paris. The battery, powered by 150 micrograms of plutonium, reportedly had a life span of 10 years

== April 28, 1970 (Tuesday) ==
- The Roman Catholic Church restrictions on interfaith marriage were partially lifted, as the U.S. National Conference of Catholic Bishops announced a decision made by Pope Paul VI. Previously, under the 1907 papal decree Ne Temere, the non-Catholic husband or wife had to promise to raise any children in the Catholic faith. The new rules eliminated the promise, but did require that the Roman Catholic partner had to promise to do everything in their power "to have all the children baptized and brought up in the Catholic Church" as a prerequisite for the marriage to be recognized by the Church, and for the non-Catholic partner to state understanding of the Catholic obligation. The new rules were to take effect on October 1.
- Born:
  - Nicklas Lidström, Swedish ice hockey defense man, seven-time winner of the NHL Norris Trophy over a 20-year career for the Detroit Red Wings, and Olympic gold medalist for Sweden in 2006; in Krylbo, Avesta Municipality
  - Diego Simeone, Argentine soccer football midfielder with 106 appearances for the national team in 14 years, later the manager for Spain's Atlético Madrid team; in Buenos Aires
- Died: Ed Begley, 69, American film actor and winner of the 1962 Academy Award for Best Supporting Actor; father of film and TV star Ed Begley Jr. The senior Begley was attending a party at the home of his publicist when he collapsed, and could not be revived.

== April 29, 1970 (Wednesday) ==
- In extra time, the Blues of Chelsea F.C. won England's FA Cup in a replay of the final, after having tied Leeds United, 2 to 2, in the 86th minute of the April 11 game. The replay, watched by a record television audience and played at Old Trafford stadium in Manchester, saw Leeds U. take a 1–0 lead in the first half, until Chelsea's Peter Osgood tied the score in the 78th minute for a 1–1 score at the end of regular play. In the 30 minute extra time period, David Webb headed the ball in at the 104th minute, after a long throw from Ian Hutchinson (whom a reporter said "can throw a ball farther than some men can kick it")
- Later in the day, England's Manchester City won the European Cup Winners' Cup, defeating Poland's Górnik Zabrze (the Zabrze Miners), 2–1, before a crowd of less than 8,000 in the Austrian capital, Vienna The "Citizens" of Manchester City had won the Football League Cup in March to qualify, while Zabrze had taken their third straight Puchar Polski in the spring.
- Born:
  - Andre Agassi, American professional tennis player, winner of eight men's Grand Slam event titles, and ATP-ranked #1 in the world six times between 1995 and 2003; in Las Vegas
  - Uma Thurman, American film actress and model; in Boston
- Died: Charles R. Chickering, 78, American freelance artist whose designs included many of the postage stamps issued by the U.S. Department of the Post Office.

== April 30, 1970 (Thursday) ==
- In a nationally televised address, U.S. President Nixon announced that he had sent 2,000 American combat troops into Cambodia and was ordering U.S. B-52 bombers to begin airstrikes. In addition, Nixon reversed an April 20 announcement that he would withdraw 150,000 troops from Vietnam over the next year, in effect providing that there would again be a need to draft young American men to maintain the current level. Despite appearances, Nixon told viewers, "This is not an invasion of Cambodia." Instead, Nixon explained, the attacks were upon territory in Cambodia that were "completely occupied and controlled by North Vietnamese forces." By the time the President's speech started at 9:00 in the evening Washington time, the U.S. operations in Cambodia had already been underway for two hours.
- Born: Halit Ergenç, Turkish TV, film and stage actor; in Istanbul
- Died: Inger Stevens, 35, Swedish-born American film and TV actress, committed suicide with an overdose of barbiturates.
