= Plateau d'Assy disaster =

1970 landslide in France

- Date: April 16, 1970
- Location: Passy, Haute-Savoie, France; 45°56′42″N 6°42′57″E
- Type: Landslide
- Deaths: 71
- Injuries: 7

The Plateau d'Assy disaster (French: Catastrophe du plateau d'Assy) was among the deadliest landslides to occur in France in the 20th century, in which 71 people, including 56 children, died following the partial destruction of a children's sanatorium in Passy, Haute-Savoie. The disaster occurred on April 16, 1970, and constituted a major event in the implementation of a policy for the prevention of natural disasters.

== Geography ==
=== Pointe de Platé ===
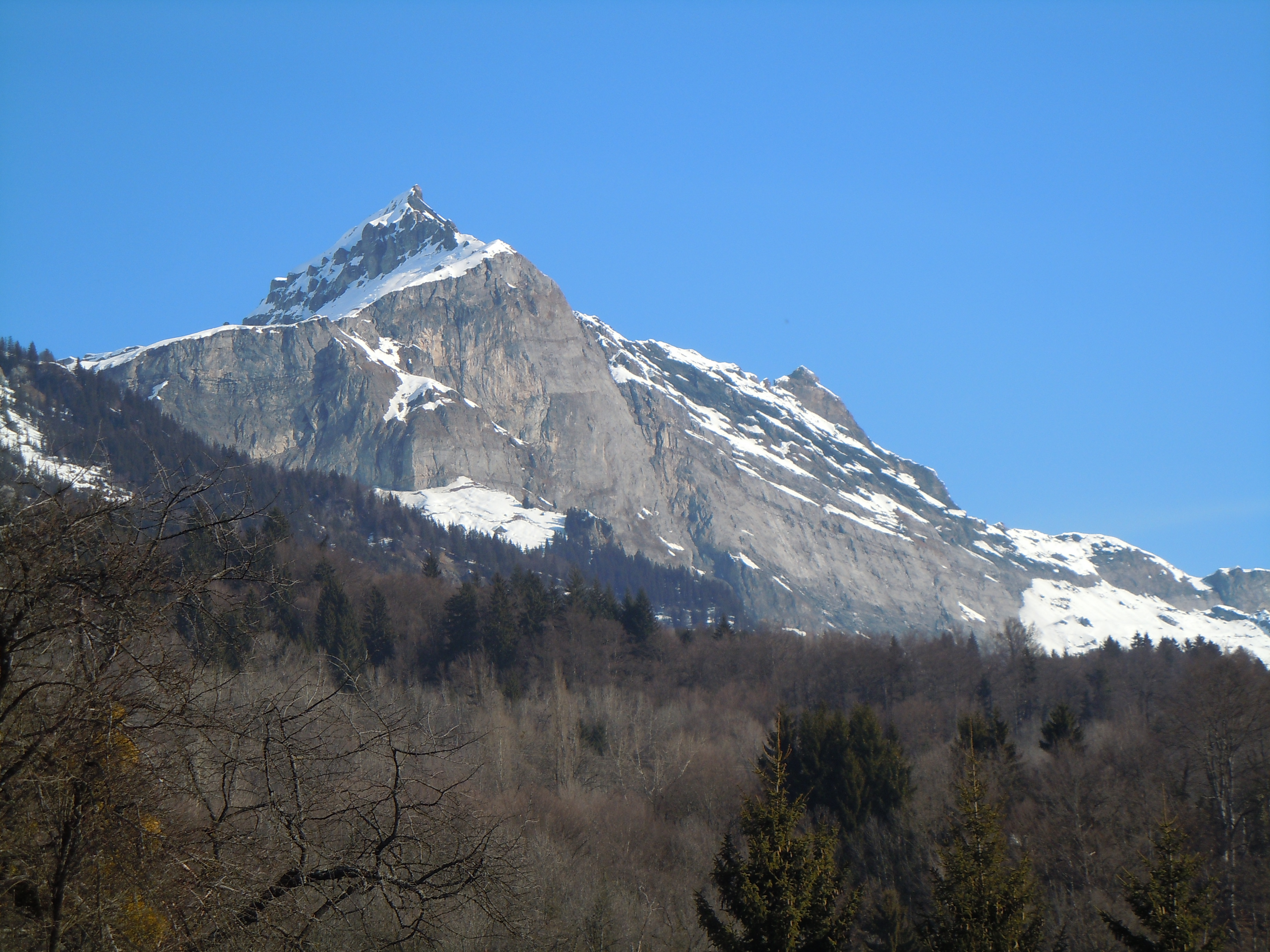
The Pointe de Platé is made up of limestones extending through the Cretaceous (Hauterivian - Maastrichtian) and overlying the strata involved in the landslide. The summit of the Pointe de Platé is composed of Oligocene sandstones.

The site of the landslide was located on the edge of the Désert de Platé, at the foot of the southwest slope of the Pointe de Platé which overlooks the commune of Passy. The cliff is made up of marl - limestone layers from the Cretaceous belonging to the subalpine nappes. The sanatorium rests on marl sequences from the Middle and Upper Jurassic which are dominated by thin Tithonian limestones. The slopes below the Tithonian escarpment are covered by a cone of clay scree resulting from the alteration of the upper formations. The escarpment is in turn topped by marly limestones from the Berriasian and black marls from the Valanginian. These relatively soft strata locally reach around ten meters and are generally covered by scree. The Upper Valanginian limestones then form a well-marked ledge beyond which the series is predominantly limestone and forms the cliffs and the main ridge. The series continues beyond to the Oligocene. The area is known to have been the scene of several major collapses including that of the Dérochoir in 1751.

=== Plateau d'Assy ===
The Plateau d'Assy is a narrow terrace that marks the southern end of the Désert de Platé and whose highest point is the Point de Platé. It was built on a large cone of scree slope overlooking the Arve Valley. This wide dispersion of scree explains the low occurrence of outcrops of the bedrock, especially marl, with the exception of the Urgonian cliffs.

=== Children's Sanatorium of Roc des Fiz ===
A group of sanatoriums, named Children's Sanatorium of Roc des Fiz, was established from 1926 on the Plateau d'Assy, on the heights of Passy, near Saint-Gervais-les-Bains, then renowned for its thermal spas.

The children's sanatorium at Roc des Fiz was inaugurated in March 1932. It is managed by the Philanthropic Association of High Altitude Sanatorium Villages, which owns three other establishments. Considered a model of a children's sanatorium, it includes a central three-story general services building from which two series of dormitory pavilions, built on stilts and connected to the central building by covered and heated walkways, depart: the girls' pavilion to the east of the central building and the boys' pavilion to the west. Finally, a fifth pavilion, alazaretto, is located between the central building and the road. The sanatorium had been under the direction of Doctor Philippe Couve de Murville since 1964 at the time of the disaster.

== Sequence of events ==
=== Prior events ===
The beginning of 1970 was marked by weather conditions which, although not particularly remarkable, would influence the outbreak of the disaster. The winter of 1969–1970 was marked by heavy snows at high altitudes. After a January marked by sunny weather that promoted the transformation of the existing snowpack into spring snow, heavy snowfalls occurred in February and March. The accumulation of fresh snow above this layer of spring snow added to the triggering of avalanches. One of them was triggered on April 5 at an altitude of around 1,450 m (4,760 ft) above the sanatorium, striking the west wing. Damage was observed by the residents of the sanatorium but the director of the establishment decided not to give in to hysteria and only temporarily evacuates one dormitory.

A week later, heavy rains hit the region from the 12th to the 14th and made the snow heavier. Up to 30 mm fell on the 12th and 13th. On April 15, the day before the disaster, a sudden thaw caused a rapid melting of the snow cover.

=== Landslide ===
Diagram of the landslide

The landslide started on April 16 around 12:15 AM. It began at around 1,630 m (5,350 ft) altitude on the southwest slope of the cliffs overlooking the sanatorium and flowed southwest, descending the slope in a straight line. At around 1,440 m (4,720 ft) altitude, the landslide followed a thalweg and branched off to the southeast, towards the sanatorium. It swept away the two buildings of the western wing as well as the nurses' and childcare workers' quarters, surprising the occupants during their sleep.

On-site observations on April 21 identified transverse crevasses between 1,650 m (5,410 ft) and 1,540 m (5,050 ft) in altitude, in a steep and unvegetated area, some of which reveal the underlying limestone bedrock.

=== Rescue ===
Rescue efforts were quickly organized and the ORSEC plan was immediately activated. 500 rescuers, assisted by the local population, participated in the search for possible survivors for four days and three nights. The access road was first cleared to allow the arrival of rescue services and the evacuation of the injured. Many public works companies provided bulldozers and excavators.

The children who were spared by the disaster were first evacuated to temporary reception centers opened by the municipality of Passy and then transferred to other sanatoriums on the Plateau d'Assy. For fear of a new landslide and because of the shutdown of the heating system - damaged by the disaster - the children living in the buildings that were not damaged were also evacuated. The latter were not even woken up by the landslide.

== Casualties ==
The death toll was 71, including the 56 children in the boys' wing, 14 female staff members, and a sister of the Order of Niederbronn assigned to guard the dormitory. Most of the children were found in their beds, surprised in their sleep, their sheets covered in blood. The youngest was two years-old. The staff also had many injured. Seven survivors were not found in the rubble but were thrown several meters. Others, like Geneviève Raphaël, were pulled from the rubble after two hours. The pediatric nurses, including Jocelyne Dalloz, a nursing assistant at the sanatorium, were instructed by the gendarmes to identify the bodies of the victims based on their pajamas.

A ceremony was held at the Notre-Dame-de-Toute-Grâce church on the Plateau d'Assy two days later, on April 18. Many political figures were present: René Galy-Dejean, Maurice Herzog (mayor of Chamonix), Charles Bosson (mayor of Annecy) and Monseigneur Sauvage (bishop of Annecy).

=== Survivors' testimony ===
Marie-Joëlle Champenois, 15 years-old:

“The landslide came from behind our house. Objects, dirt and stones started falling on me. Our building was being carried forward with the landslide. Then all of a sudden, we were in the dark. My roommate helped me out because I couldn’t manage. We let ourselves slide into the void. We found ourselves outside, barefoot in the snow and in our pajamas, in the mud and rubble. We started shouting: “Where are the boys? We have to rescue them!” But we couldn't see the buildings anymore.”

Original text:

"La coulée est arrivée par derrière notre pavillon. Des objets, de la terre et des cailloux ont commencé à me tomber dessus. Notre bâtiment était emporté avec la coulée, vers l’avant. Puis tout d’un coup, on s’est retrouvé dans le noir. Ma voisine de chambre m’a fait sortir car je n’y arrivais pas. On s’est laissées glisser dans le vide. Nous nous sommes retrouvées dehors, pieds nus dans la neige et en pyjama, dans la boue et les gravats. On s’est mis à crier : « Où sont les garçons ? Il faut les secourir ! » Mais on ne voyait plus les bâtiments."

Chantal Legerot, nurse:

"I found myself buried under the rubble of the carers' accommodation. I remember hearing the sound of birds: that's what made me realize that I wasn't buried deep which reassured me. The emergency services then took care of me."

Original text:

"Je me suis retrouvée ensevelie sous les décombres du logement des soignants. Je me souviens avoir entendu le bruit des oiseaux : c’est ce qui m’a fait dire que je n’étais pas enterrée profondément et m’a rassuré. Les secours m’ont ensuite prise en charge."

== See also ==
- List of disasters in France by death toll
