= Christel and Eckhard Wehage =

Married plane hijackers

Christel and Eckhard Wehage were a married East German couple who committed suicide jointly after a hijacking attempt to flee the German Democratic Republic on 10 March 1970 failed.

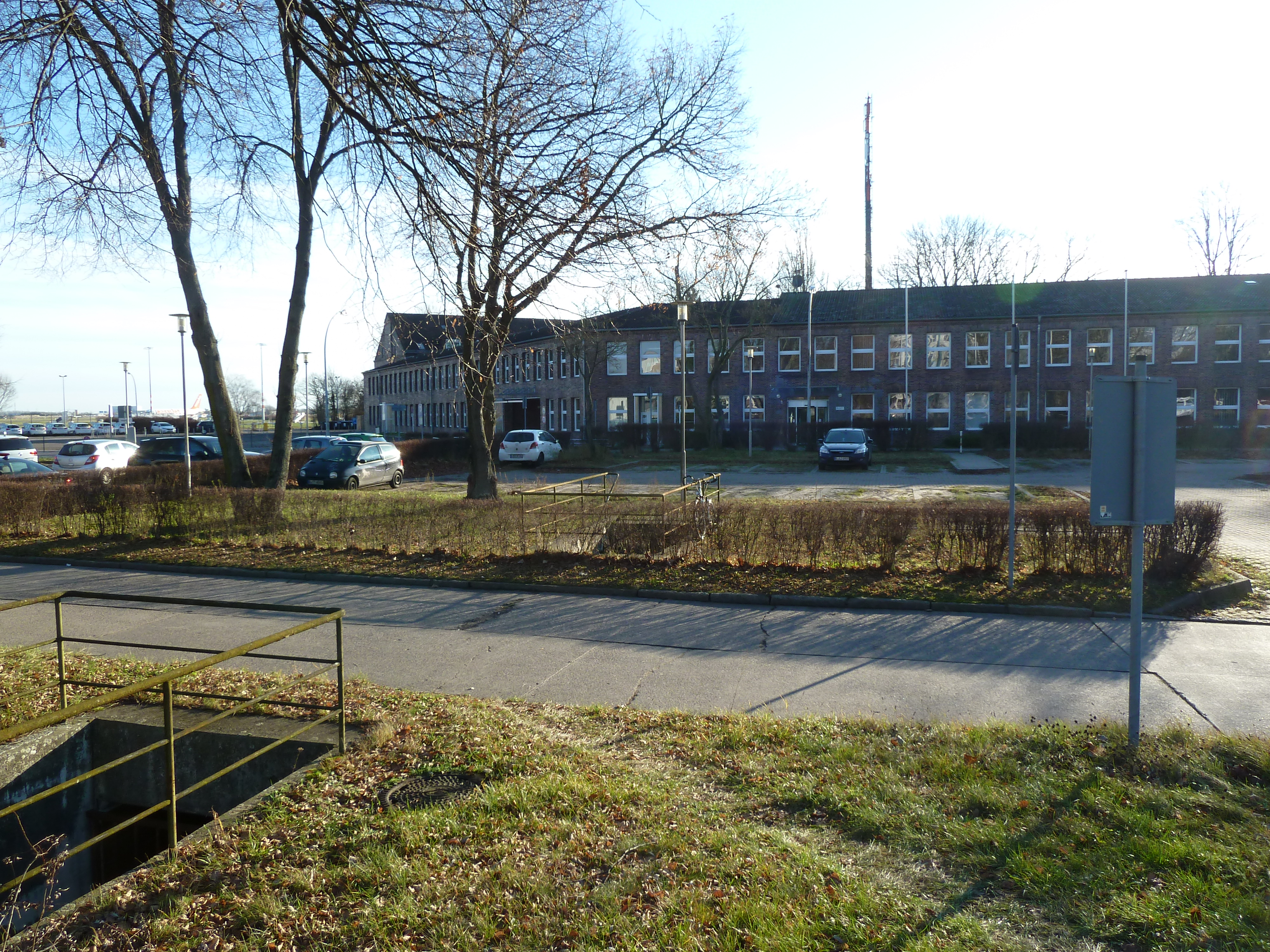
Former Mitropa Flughafen Schönefeld Hotel, where the Wehages spent their last night prior to their deaths (2017 photo)

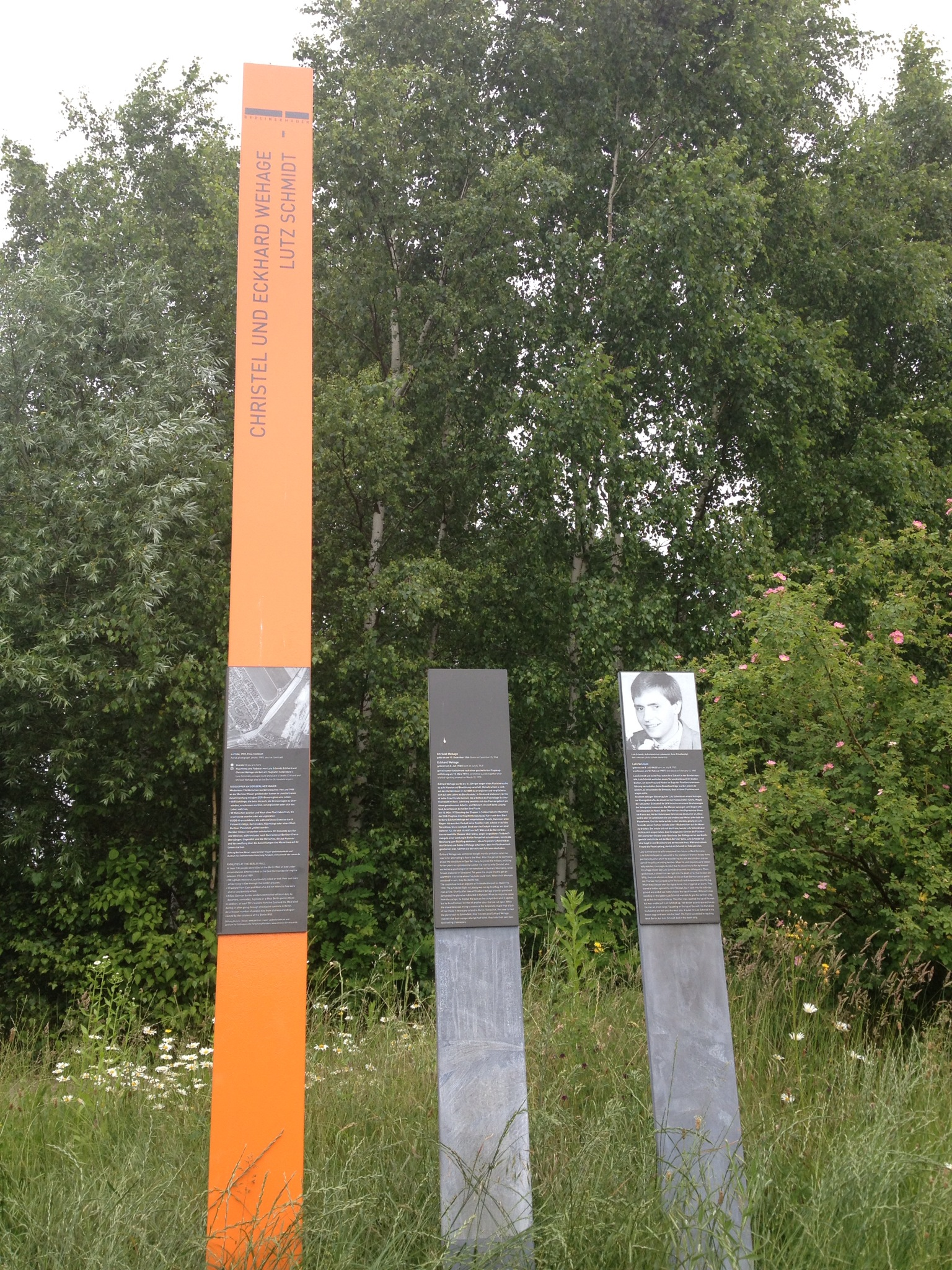
Memorial for Christel and Eckhard Wehage (and for Lutz Schmidt) on the "Berliner Mauerweg", in Altglienicke

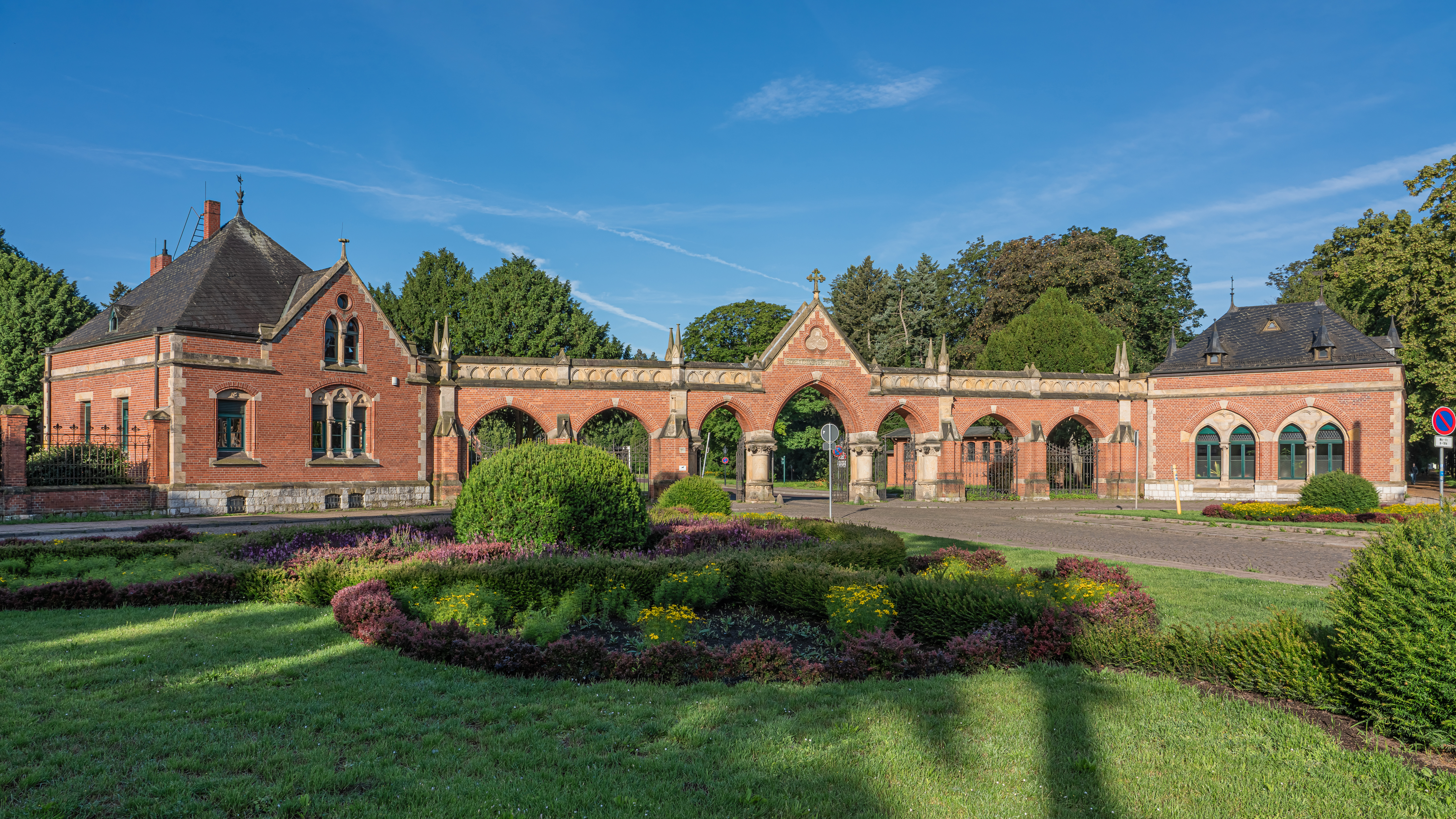
Main entrance to the Westfriedhof in Magdeburg, Germany; this is where the Berlin Wall victims Christel and Eckhard Wehage are buried.

== Biography ==
Eckhard Wehage (born 8 July 1948 in Berssel, Harz, Saxony-Anhalt) enlisted in the East German Navy in 1967 after two failed attempts as a youth to flee the German Democratic Republic (GDR). He eventually graduated from the non-commissioned officer school in Stralsund, and was assigned as a chief petty officer to a de-mining boat.

Christel Wehage (née Zinke; born 15 December 1946 in Wolmirstedt, Börde, Saxony-Anhalt) worked in her hometown district hospital as a psychotherapist.

They met while Eckhard was attending school, eventually married, and wanted to start a family. But they were confronted with the restrictions of adult life in East Germany. Specifically, East Germans were unable to choose where they worked or resided; the state delegated where its citizens lived and worked. They endured futile attempts over several years to obtain an apartment together in an area where they could both work. In farewell letters that they wrote to their parents, they explained their reasons in detail for their joint escape attempt. The apartment dilemma was the main reason in their justification; had they had children, only then, after waiting for an indefinite amount of time, they might have been provided with such living quarters. But under the uncertain circumstances, having children would have only made their dilemma greater.

Not wanting to live their lives waiting for an apartment where they could both reside and commute to work, they decided to flee to West Germany by hijacking an airplane. Eckhard obtained two pistols and ammunition from his unit's armory before departing on a short leave from duty. He and Christel met in East Berlin, and booked two seats on a flight from East Berlin to Dresden on 9 March 1970. After this flight was cancelled, they booked two seats on a flight from East Berlin to Leipzig that was scheduled to depart on 10 March 1970. They spent the night prior at the Schönefeld airport hotel; their parents received their farewell letters that they wrote to them from there. Eckhard acknowledged in his letter the possible consequences of a third attempt to flee the GDR, explaining that they only wanted to live their own lives as they wished, and should their hijacking plan fail, then death is the best solution.

== Death ==
Just before 08:00 on the morning of 10 March 1970, the couple and 15 other passengers boarded the Antonov AN-24 airplane, run by the East German airline, Interflug, to Leipzig. Shortly after take-off, Eckhard drew his pistol and ordered the stewardess, Monika Heine, to tell the pilots to fly to Hanover. This she passed to the cockpit, along with a secret code used for a hijacking. Eckhard's attempt to access the cockpit failed, but the stewardess intervened, trying to convince them that a lack of fuel necessitated landing in Berlin-Tempelhof, in West Berlin. In actuality, the cockpit crew landed the airplane back in Schönefeld. When they looked out the window during landing, and saw that they were back in Schönefeld, they realized that their escape attempt had failed. After returning to their seats while the plane landed, they fired the fatal shots, killing themselves. Their bodies were cremated in East Berlin, and later, their ashes were initially buried at the Neustädter Friedhof cemetery in Magdeburg in the presence of their immediate families. Seventeen years later, on 26 August 1987, their cremains were reburied in the Urn Community Grounds section of the Westfriedhof, also in Magdeburg; it is not known who arranged for and accomplished the reburying.

Among the total of at least 140 Berlin Wall victims, Christel and Eckhard Wehage were the only two victims to die as part of a failed hijacking attempt, and one of two married couples to be classified as Berlin Wall victims.

== Aftermath ==
Afterwards, the parents of both Eckhard and Christel were the focus of a Stasi investigation. Their apartments were bugged and searched, their mail was censored, they were placed under surveillance during their daily lives, and they were interrogated for possible complicity. The Stasi successfully directed both sets of parents to cooperate in disguising the truth behind their children's deaths. Relatives, colleagues, and friends were told that Eckhard and Christel were driving to Rostock to look at an apartment when they died as a result of crashing into a tree. The story was that the accident was the result of driving too fast for conditions on icy roads. Stasi informants were used to report on the mood of the people in the areas where the parents lived. Despite Stasi efforts to hide the truth, rumors connecting the death of Eckhard and Christel to the failed hijacking in Berlin-Schönefeld could not be silenced.

During a ceremony on 26 March 1970, the crew of the hijacked plane was personally awarded the NVA Gold Medal of Merit by Stasi minister Erich Mielke. The minister also gave the pilot (Captain Schmidt) a stereo radio, the co-pilot a tape recorder, the flight mechanic (Walter Kohse) a rug, and the stewardess (Monika Heine) a sewing machine. The aircraft was then sold by Interflug to Vietnam Airlines in 1976 and the registration number was changed to VN-B226. Just 3 years later, this aircraft was hijacked again while flying from Gia Lam Airport (Hanoi) to Tan Son Nhat International Airport (Ho Chi Minh City).

After a quarter of a century passed, a former East German contacted the Central Investigating Agency for Governmental and Party Crimes, reporting on the Wehage's fatal escape attempt. The public prosecutor's office subsequently opened an investigation in October 1996, which was dismissed in June 1997; no evidence of criminal activity on the part of the East German authorities could be found. Charges against the Wehages for crimes that they may have committed were not necessary because of their deaths.

== See also ==
- List of deaths at the Berlin Wall
- Berlin Crisis of 1961
