= Désert de Platé =

Désert de Platé (French pronunciation: [dezɛʁ də plate]) is a natural site classified in 1998 in Haute-Savoie, France, in the Faucigny massif, belonging to the Giffre Massif. It is dominated by the Grandes Platières, at 2,480 meters above sea level.

The site covers the municipalities of Magland, Passy and Sallanches.
