= Villepreux-Les Clayes rail accident =

1910 rail disaster in France

Villepreux disaster
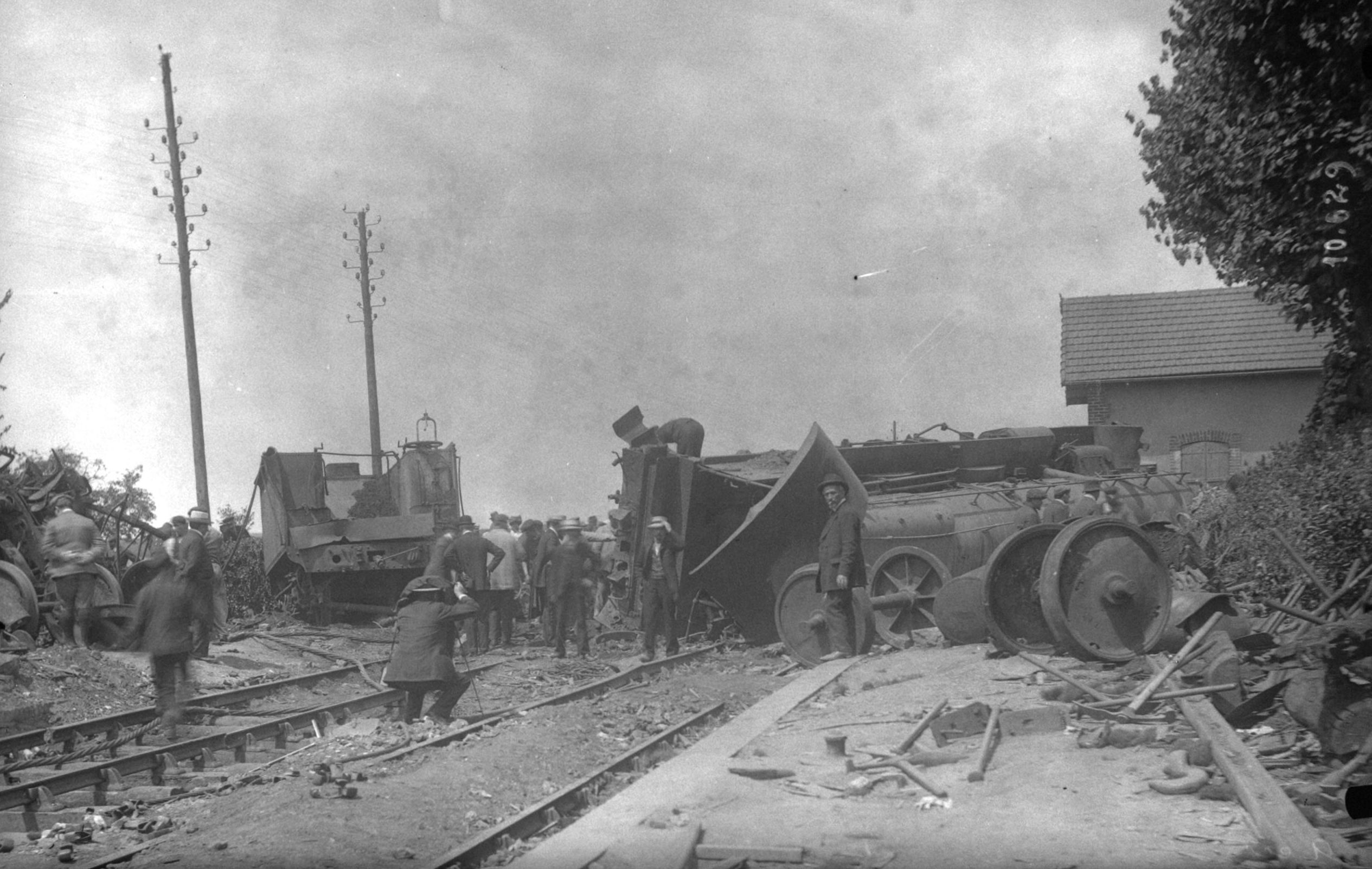
- The locomotive and tender of the Granville express after the wreckage was removed

Details
- Date: June 18, 1910; 116 years ago 18:10
- Location: Villepreux–Les Clayes station, Les Clayes-sous-Bois, then in Seine-et-Oise; 29 km (18 mi); 18 mi (29 km)
- Coordinates: 48°49′26″N 1°59′34″E
- Country: France
- Line: Saint-Cyr–Surdon railway line
- Operator: Chemins de fer de l'État
- Service: Local and express trains
- Incident type: Rear-end collision
- Cause: Signal passed at danger (suspected)

Statistics
- Trains: 2
- Deaths: 23–28
- Injured: 59–80
- Damage: Several wooden coaches destroyed by fire

The Villepreux–Les Clayes rail accident, commonly referred to at the time as the Villepreux disaster, took place on 18 June 1910 on the Saint-Cyr–Surdon railway line, when an express train collided at 18:10 (local time) with a stationary local train in the Villepreux–Les Clayes station, located twenty-nine kilometres from Paris, in the commune of Les Clayes-sous-Bois, then in the Seine-et-Oise department.

The accident caused at least twenty-three deaths and fifty-nine injuries, and was the first in a tragic series of fatal accidents on the Chemins de fer de l'État, including at Saujon (August 1910), Bernay (September 1910), and Courville (February 1911), which provoked heavy criticism of the administration.

== Circumstances ==
The press at the time seemed more concerned with conveying the morbid atmosphere of the disaster and stirring the emotions of readers than with reporting the circumstances precisely. Accounts generally dwelt on the most pathetic or horrible details, while the actual sequence of events was reported with many inaccuracies and approximations, even when the information came from public authorities.

On Saturday, 18 June, train no. 467, a local service to Dreux, departed at 16:20 from the Gare des Invalides. It stopped at Champ de Mars, Versailles-Chantiers, and Saint-Cyr before arriving at 17:10 in the small station of Villepreux–Les Clayes. There, the driver, who had already been forced to halt on the line earlier due to mechanical trouble, attempted a makeshift repair, blocking the level crossing of the rural road linking Villepreux and Les Clayes at the end of the platform.

The cause of the breakdown was reported differently in various newspapers. Le Petit Parisien and Le Petit Journal stated that an axle and a rod had broken on the locomotive. Other papers, more numerous, claimed that the distribution gear had failed, several bolts having sheared off a valve casing. An engineer of the Ouest-État railway directing clearance operations told a journalist that one of the boiler tubes had burst. Finally, when questioned in the Senate, the Minister of Public Works, Alexandre Millerand, attributed the accident to "the loss of a brake".

After more than three-quarters of an hour of unsuccessful efforts to restart the disabled locomotive, it was judged unfit to continue. A replacement engine was requested by telegraph from the Versailles-Matelots depot. It was while awaiting the relief locomotive that the collision occurred, though here again press reports diverged. A majority of newspapers related the facts as though the broken-down train had remained on the main track at Villepreux–Les Clayes station and was struck in its entirety by the express. Le Petit Journal reported that "of the thirteen cars of the local train, eleven had been crushed". Le Matin added that in the collision, the driver (Sérons) and guard (Bardet) of the local train had been thrown onto the track and injured. Confirming this version implicitly, Le Figaro published a letter from a reader who wondered why the disabled train had not been shunted onto a siding.

In reality, before the accident the crew of the disabled engine and the station staff had begun manoeuvres to clear the train to a siding. After the train was split in two, the locomotive managed to haul only the front section (emptied of passengers) a short distance, about 100 metres, leaving the rear four coaches and the luggage van at the platform. Some passengers alighted, while others remained aboard. The stationmaster, M. Cozic, expected the locomotive of the following train to remove these vehicles. He had set both the distant and home signals to danger and dispatched a railwayman with a red flag to warn the oncoming express.

Meanwhile, express no. 577 for Granville had left the Gare des Invalides at 17:14. It consisted of thirteen vehicles, including a dining car at the front, hauled by a recently delivered locomotive, no. 2794 (class 230), assigned to the French State Railways following the takeover of the Ouest company in 1909. It was driven by engineer Henri Leduc and fireman Lecordier, both from the Argentan depot. Its first stop was Versailles-Chantiers, where it arrived at 17:45 and where the crew were informed they would make an additional stop at Nonant-le-Pin. The loading of numerous parcels delayed departure by two minutes, and a further two were lost at Saint-Cyr due to a closed distant signal.

Keen to make up time, the crew ran the locomotive at full pressure. While attempting to feed water into the boiler, the injector on the driver's side failed, and the safety valve lifted. Amid a cloud of steam, Leduc tried repeatedly to restart the faulty device by purging it. As he did so, and while the fireman was occupied breaking up briquettes, the train passed the distant signal for Villepreux station, which was at danger and accompanied by an audible warning. Believing the signal should have been clear since the preceding local train was not due to be overtaken until Dreux, Leduc presumed it was open and, without checking, sounded the "line clear" whistle as regulations required. A kilometre further on, descending a gradient at 102 km/h (63 mph), he suddenly saw the home signal at Villepreux–Les Clayes at danger and the railwayman waving his red flag about 180 metres (590 ft) ahead. Leduc applied the emergency brake, but the distance was too short to prevent collision with the stationary coaches.

== The accident ==
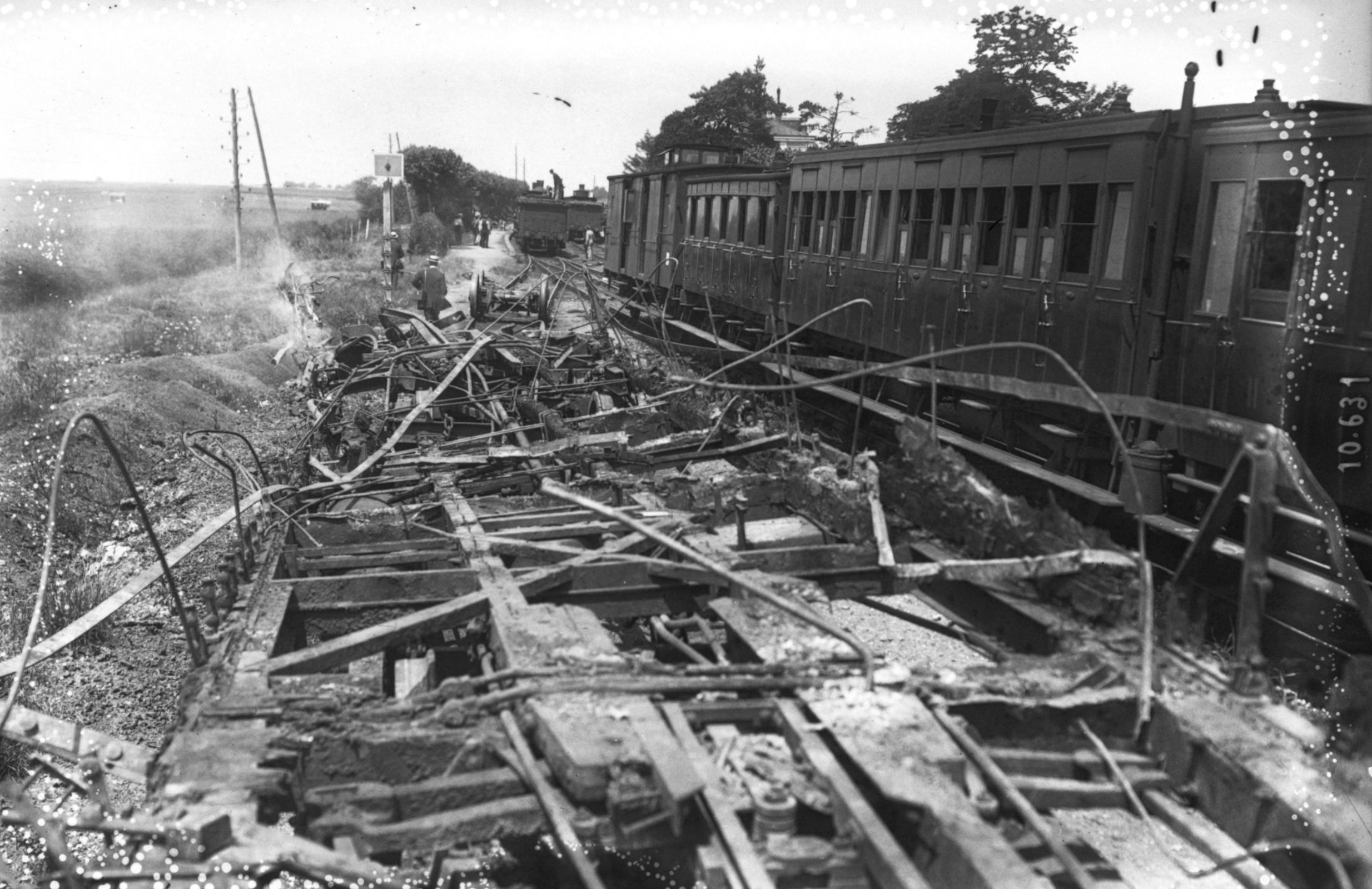
Burned-out coaches after the collision.

In full view of horrified bystanders at the station, train 577 struck the five stationary vehicles at about 70 km/h (43 mph). The impact pushed them for about 80 m (260 ft), climbing over and crushing them, scattering debris across both platforms, and tearing down telegraph wires. The locomotive and its tender then detached and toppled on either side of the track, near the crossing keeper's house. Behind them, the baggage van, the dining car, and the first four coaches of the express telescoped. Almost immediately, fire broke out from the engine's firebox and the dining car's stoves, spreading quickly through the wreckage, fueled by the wooden carriages and the gas lighting reservoirs of the coaches.

Later it was noted that another train from Granville should have been passing through the station on the opposite track at that very moment. However, it had run two minutes ahead of schedule, and this providential advance prevented a catastrophic secondary accident.

== Rescue ==
Although physically uninjured, the stationmaster, M. Cozic, suffered a severe psychological shock from the catastrophe and proved incapable of taking any initiative. One of his colleagues, M. Lépinay, stationmaster at Colleville (Seine-Inférieure), happened to be on site, and took over to organize the first rescue efforts and re-establish telegraphic communication.

While awaiting outside assistance, surviving passengers, railway staff, and passers-by stopped at the level crossing aided the victims, especially in trying to extract those trapped in carriages threatened by flames. The dead were laid out in the waiting room, which was turned into a makeshift morgue. The most seriously injured were taken into Villepreux, either to a doctor's house or to a local orphanage. Later, some were moved to the hospital in Versailles, while others were evacuated by a relief train to the Montparnasse station and distributed among Paris hospitals. Amid the general confusion, the driver and fireman of the striking train, both injured, remained at the site for two hours before being placed on a relief train back to Dreux, then continued to Argentan where they received treatment at home. The small rural station, little more than an isolated chalet, had no firefighting equipment or even a water supply. Faced with the magnitude of the blaze, the first rescuers were soon forced to withdraw, managing only to move by hand the rear carriages of the express that had remained on the track. Firefighters arrived later from Villepreux and then from Versailles on a relief train that left that city at 19:00, but they too had to resign themselves to waiting until the flames burned themselves out around midnight.

In the meantime, the prefect of Seine-et-Oise, Auguste Autrand, and the Minister of Public Works, Alexandre Millerand, arrived by automobile, while two additional relief trains were dispatched from Montparnasse at 20:30 and 22:00.

Clearing operations were quickly undertaken by railway workers, assisted by soldiers of the 5th Engineer Regiment of Versailles, and even cadets of the École spéciale militaire de Saint-Cyr. Despite the throngs of onlookers that slowed their work, traffic was restored the next day at 16:30 on a single track, and on both tracks by 01:10 two days later.

A year later, at the request of the mayor of Les Clayes, the silver medal of the Société des sauveteurs de Seine-et-Oise was awarded to M. Lépinay and three other rescuers in recognition of their efforts. ter from Villepreux and Versailles. The fire burned until midnight due to lack of water supplies.

== Casualties ==
The locomotive had literally crushed and torn apart the wooden carriages of the local train, and all their occupants, except for a few who had been thrown clear, were killed. Most of the dozens of people standing on the two platforms were unable to escape because of the thick hedges bordering them, and many were badly injured by flying debris. For several days there was uncertainty about the number of victims. On the one hand, the bodies recovered from the wreckage were reduced to unrecognizable charred remains; on the other, based on witness accounts, it was feared that some injured passengers might have wandered into the surrounding fields to die. Several people whose relatives had lost track of them were presumed dead in the accident. Such was the case, for example, of a well-known doctor, Dr. Baumany, whose hat was found among the debris and who was reported dead until he announced that he was alive and well.

In the end, even months after the disaster, the exact toll remained uncertain. In September 1910, Le Petit Parisien reported 26 dead and 53 injured. In January 1911, at the opening of the trial before the Versailles criminal court, figures varied: 23 dead and 80 injured for Le Petit Journal, 28 and 80 for Le Journal, and 24 and 59 for Le Temps.

The press gave particular attention to certain victims, either because of their social standing or the sympathy they inspired. One widely reported case was the death of a member of Parisian high society and his five-year-old son. Another was that of a girl who had just made her First Communion, whose parents were able to identify her body only by a ring and a charred shoe. The newspapers also reported on the fate of some survivors, such as two couples of artists who had stepped onto the platform with their luggage and were seriously injured by debris, but who happily recovered one their dog in its basket and the other their parrot in its cage.

Another case that drew attention was that of a passer-by, Madame Boudineau, who was walking from Villepreux to Les Clayes with her grandson and waiting on the platform for the level crossing blocked by the stalled train to open. She was gravely injured while shielding the child, who fled in terror and was later found wandering barefoot in the fields. But since her presence at the station was purely accidental, unlike that of ticket-holding passengers, the State denied her any right to compensation, holding that she was at fault.

There were no collective funerals for those whose bodies had been identified, who were buried in their home towns, often in the presence of public officials. However, on 23 June the coffins containing the unidentifiable remains of six victims, including a young English governess, were interred in the cemetery of Les Clayes during a ceremony attended by their families, the prefect, the mayors of the two communes, and representatives of the government.

== Investigation of responsibility ==
As in all accidents involving casualties, a judicial inquiry was immediately opened and entrusted to an investigating judge of Versailles. He issued a warrant of arrest against the driver Henri Leduc who, three days after his return to Argentan, was declared fit to travel, brought to Versailles, interrogated, and placed in pre-trial detention at Saint-Pierre prison. However, the measure aroused numerous protests, including that of the Federation of Mechanics and Firemen, and two days later the Minister of Justice, Louis Barthou, ordered his release on bail.

Three months later, investigators returned to the site and repeated the journey from Plaisir on board a locomotive, although this reconstruction brought little new information, other than reinforcing their conviction of the exclusive guilt of the driver.

On 21 June, Parliament also reacted to the catastrophe when questions were put to the government in the Chamber of Deputies by Régis-Marie-Joseph de L'Estourbeillon de La Garnache, and in the Senate by Adrien Gaudin de Villaine and Albert Gérard. The first did not give rise to a specific debate, though in the wake of other serious accidents the theme was raised repeatedly in the following months. The Senate debates of 30 June, however, provided the occasion for many criticisms of the Ouest-État railway, whose defective equipment and poor services were, according to its detractors, more responsible for the catastrophe than the driver who had directly caused it.

=== The equipment ===
The newspaper L'Aurore, in an editorial entitled "Responsabilités", argued that the accident was due less to human error than to the failure of the locomotives of the two trains, citing their obsolescence. The Minister of Public Works implicitly confirmed this, declaring: "It is certainly no news to me when one speaks of the poor state of the equipment of the Ouest-État. When we took over from the Compagnie de l'Ouest, it left us equipment so defective that, once the inventory was completed, I thought it my duty to alert the Chamber to cover our responsibility."

The former operating company published a communiqué denying responsibility, stating that although the locomotive that had broken down and blocked the omnibus was forty-three years old, it had been delivered in good condition when the State purchased it on 1 January 1909. Moreover, the locomotive of the express train, which had collided with it, was new, having been placed in service at the end of 1908, and its adjustment and maintenance therefore could not be blamed on them.

=== Service operation ===
The Ouest-État was first criticized for entrusting the express to a driver who lacked adequate qualifications. Henri Leduc, aged 35, after serving in the Navy, had twelve years' seniority with the company, but only as a fireman, and had been acting as a substitute driver for three months, assigned to the Paris–Granville line for only fifteen days. Some observers believed his insistence on trying to use the left injector, although another was available on the right side, was proof of his inexperience.

The stationmaster of Villepreux was also blamed for contacting the Versailles-Matelots depot by telegraph to request a relief locomotive, but failing to inform the stations along the route, especially Versailles-Chantiers, where the express might have been held or at least its driver warned. A surviving passenger even wrote a detailed letter to Le Matin, widely reprinted, denouncing this omission.

Criticism was also directed at the absence of detonators on the track to punctuate the closed signal.

=== Personal fault of the driver ===
Henri Leduc was above all accused of ignoring the distant signal at Villepreux-Les Clayes, which was set at danger, and failing to reduce speed so as to be prepared to stop at the next. This was surprising, since, as his logbook showed, he had carefully observed the signal at Saint-Cyr a few kilometres earlier. Questioned by the judge, he explained that he had passed Villepreux just after the safety valve blew. He had then assumed the signal was open, without checking, partly due to visibility being obscured by steam and partly because he was preoccupied with feeding the boiler by clearing the blocked injector. He feared that the injector on the fireman's side was unusable, since it had already malfunctioned on the outward journey.

The locomotive's Flaman tape showed that before the emergency brake was applied, the train was travelling at 102 kilometres per hour (63 mph), and although some considered this excessive, it was not judged abnormal on that section of line.

Given his speed, the express could only have been stopped in time with a braking distance of about 800 metres (2,600 ft), but this was not available. The Villepreux-Les Clayes station and its home signal were located just after a curve with no visibility. Moreover, the railwayman sent to meet the train with a red flag seemed to have failed in his task. While he claimed to have gone at least 500 metres (1,600 ft) from the station, he had told L'Humanité earlier that it was only 200 metres (660 ft), and other witnesses said it was no more than 80 metres (260 ft). Leduc thus saw him at the same time as the home signal, when only 180 metres (590 ft) away, far too short to prevent the collision.

Ultimately, only Henri Leduc was brought before the correctional court of Versailles, charged with involuntary manslaughter. His trial opened on 19 January 1911 and lasted three hearings. His lawyers, Lucien Salmon and Albert Willm, pursued a political defense by attacking Ouest-État exclusively, creating an incident at the very first hearing. The public prosecutor, on the other hand, emphasized the gravity of the driver's fault and refused him any mitigating circumstance.

The judgment, delivered on 4 February 1911, declared the driver solely responsible for the catastrophe, expressly excluding any fault attributable to Ouest-État that might serve as a mitigating factor. The penalty, however, was relatively lenient: two years' suspended prison sentence and a fine of 500 francs, in view of his clean record, good character references, and family situation. Though criminally acquitted, the State was declared civilly liable, and was therefore required to compensate victims and their dependents.

This judgment might have closed the case if the State had not refused compensation to Mme Boudineau, who was only present on the platform because of the closed level crossing. The civil court of the Seine in 1911 and the Paris Court of Appeal in 1912, inspired more by equity than by strict legal reasoning, held that she was entitled to be in the station, since she had gone there to seek information on crossing the tracks.
