= Beynes, Yvelines =

Beynes
- Commune
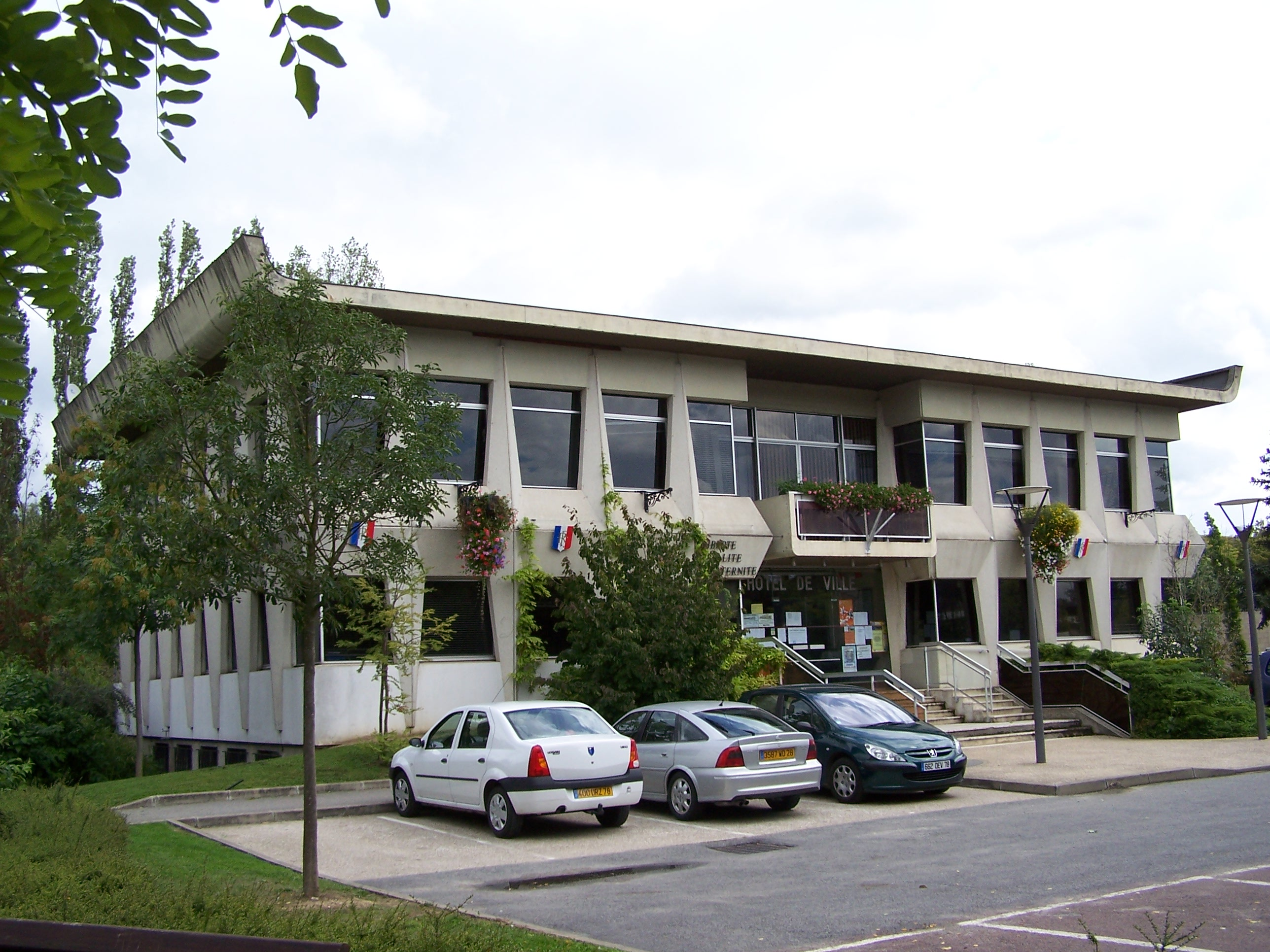
- The town hall in Beynes

- Coat of arms
- Location of Beynes
- Location within France Location within Île-de-France (region)
- Coordinates: 48°52′N 1°52′E
- Country: France
- Region: Île-de-France
- Department: Yvelines
- Arrondissement: Rambouillet
- Canton: Plaisir
- Intercommunality: Cœur d'Yvelines

Government
  - Mayor (2020–2026): Yves Revel
- Area^{1}: 18.56 km^{2} (7.17 sq mi)
- Elevation: 50 m (160 ft)
- Highest elevation: 134 m (440 ft)
- Lowest elevation: 39 m (128 ft)
- Population (2023): 7,704
  - Density: 415.1/km^{2} (1,075/sq mi)
- Time zone: UTC+01:00 (CET)
  - Summer (DST): UTC+02:00 (CEST)
- INSEE/Postal code: 78062 /78650
- ^{1} French Land Register data, which excludes lakes, ponds, glaciers > 1 km^{2} (0.386 sq mi or 247 acres) and river estuaries.

Beynes (French pronunciation: [bɛn]) is a commune in the Yvelines department in north-central France.

== Population ==
Historical population
Year	Pop.	±% p.a.
1968	1,571	—
1975	5,501	+19.61%
1982	7,593	+4.71%
1990	7,445	−0.25%
1999	7,200	−0.37%
2007	7,501	+0.51%
2012	7,625	+0.33%
2017	7,662	+0.10%
2023	7,704	+0.09%
Source: INSEE

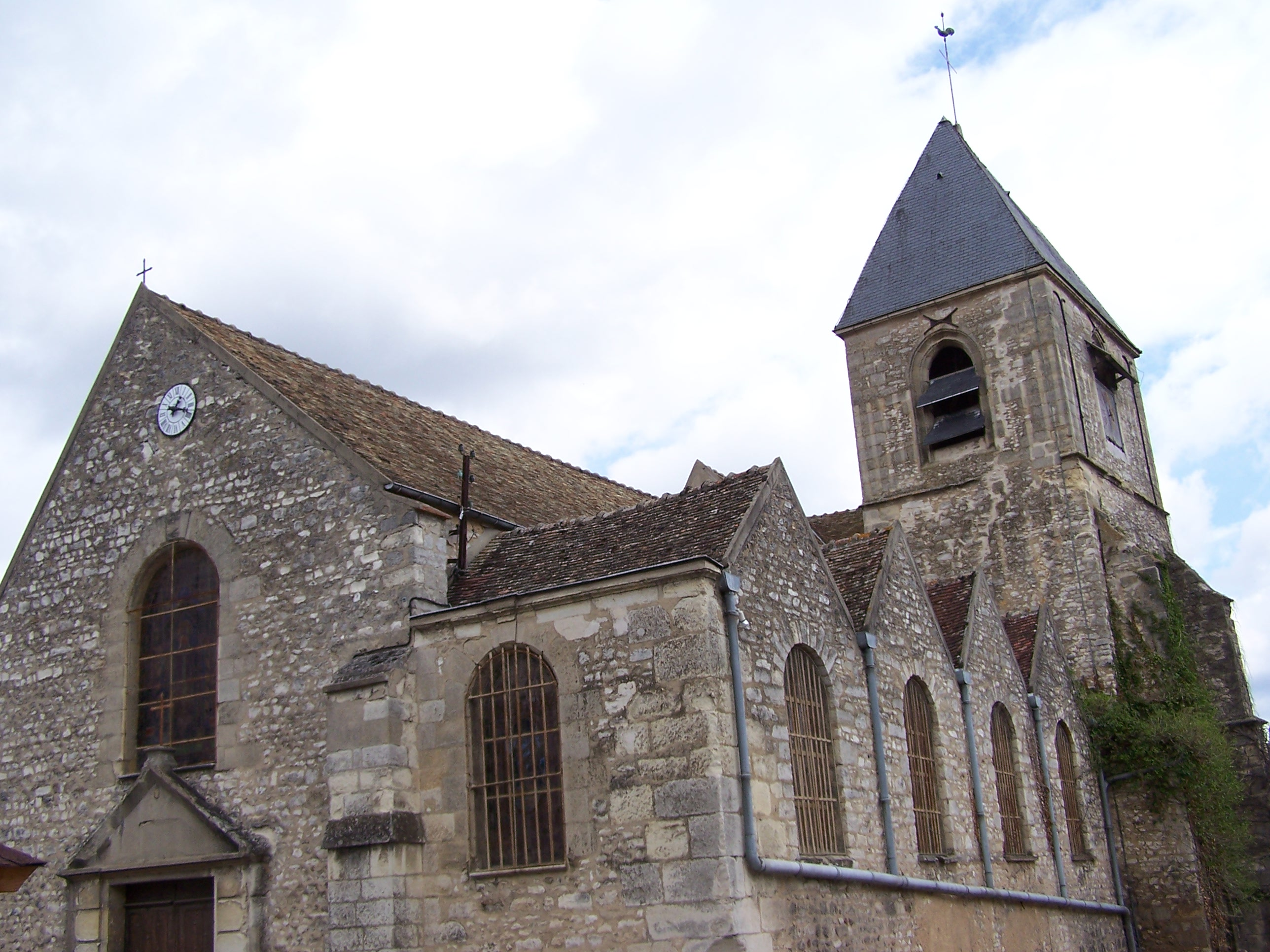
Saint-Martin

== See also ==
- Communes of the Yvelines department
