= Plaisir =

- Commune
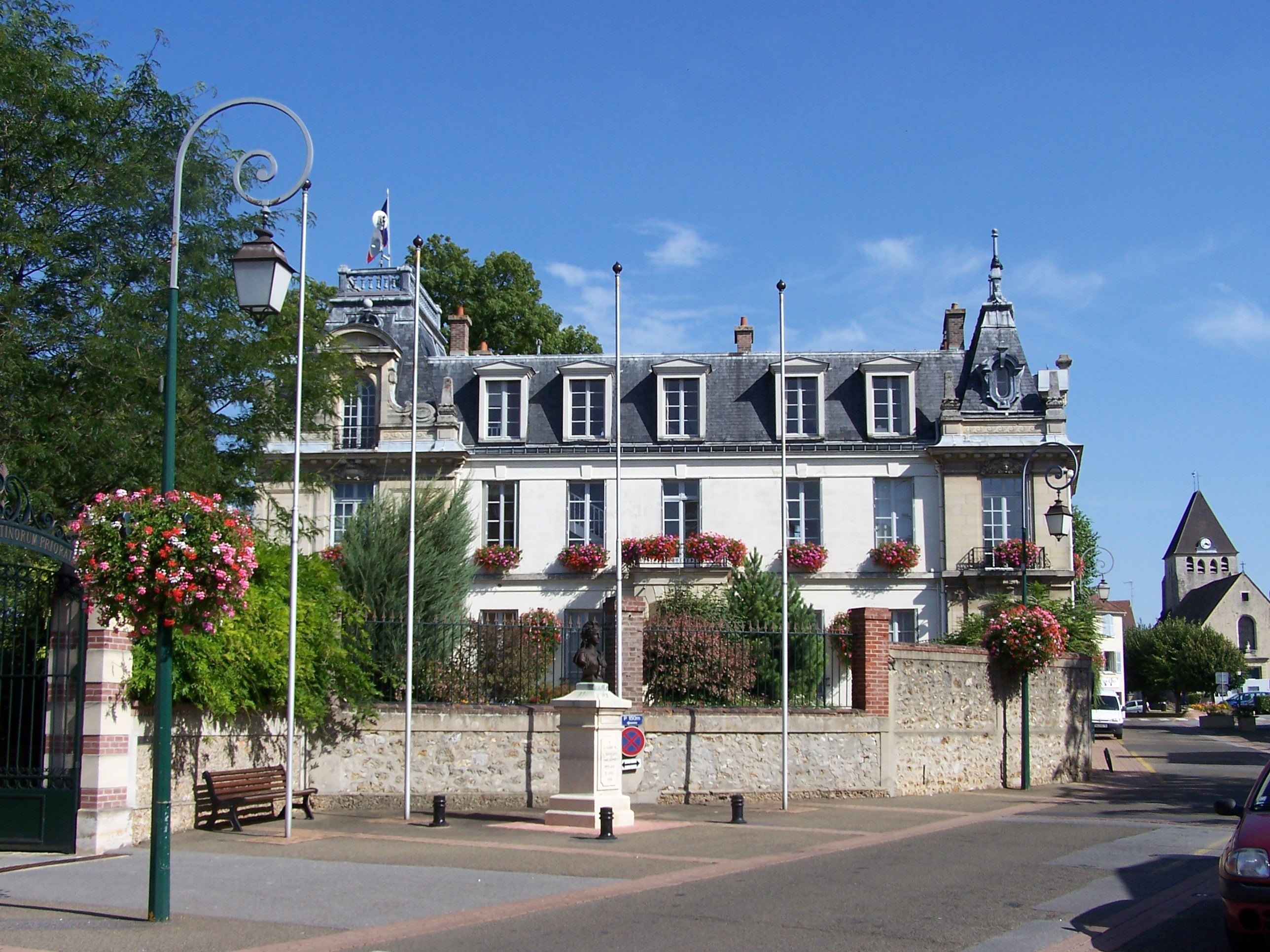
- Town hall

- Coat of arms

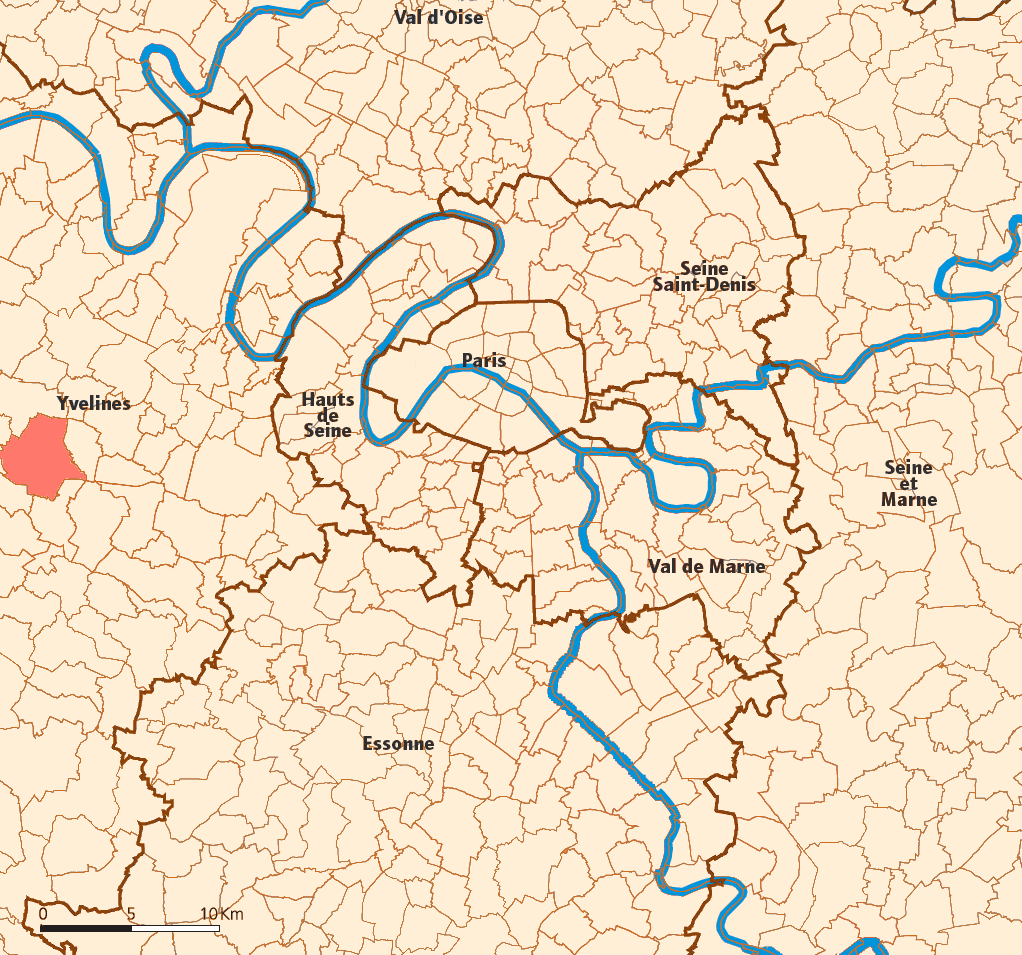
- Location (in red) within Paris inner and outer suburbs
- Location of Plaisir
- Location within France Location within Île-de-France (region)
- Coordinates: 48°49′06″N 1°56′50″E
- Country: France
- Region: Île-de-France
- Department: Yvelines
- Arrondissement: Versailles
- Canton: Plaisir
- Intercommunality: Saint-Quentin-en-Yvelines

Government
  - Mayor (2020–2026): Joséphine Kollmannsberger
- Area^{1}: 18.68 km^{2} (7.21 sq mi)
- Elevation: 111 m (364 ft)
- Highest elevation: 173 m (568 ft)
- Lowest elevation: 92 m (302 ft)
- Population (2023): 31,811
  - Density: 1,703/km^{2} (4,411/sq mi)
- Time zone: UTC+01:00 (CET)
  - Summer (DST): UTC+02:00 (CEST)
- INSEE/Postal code: 78490 /78370
- ^{1} French Land Register data, which excludes lakes, ponds, glaciers > 1 km^{2} (0.386 sq mi or 247 acres) and river estuaries.

Plaisir (French pronunciation: [plɛziʁ]) is a commune located in the heart of the Yvelines department in the Île-de-France region in Northern France. It is located in the western outer suburbs of Paris, 29.5 km (18.3 mi) from the centre of Paris. It borders among others on Élancourt (south), Trappes (southeast) and Les Clayes-sous-Bois (east).

Plaisir is the eleventh commune of the Yvelines department in terms of population, with nearly 32,000 inhabitants. It is a member of the communauté d'agglomération Saint-Quentin-en-Yvelines.

== History ==
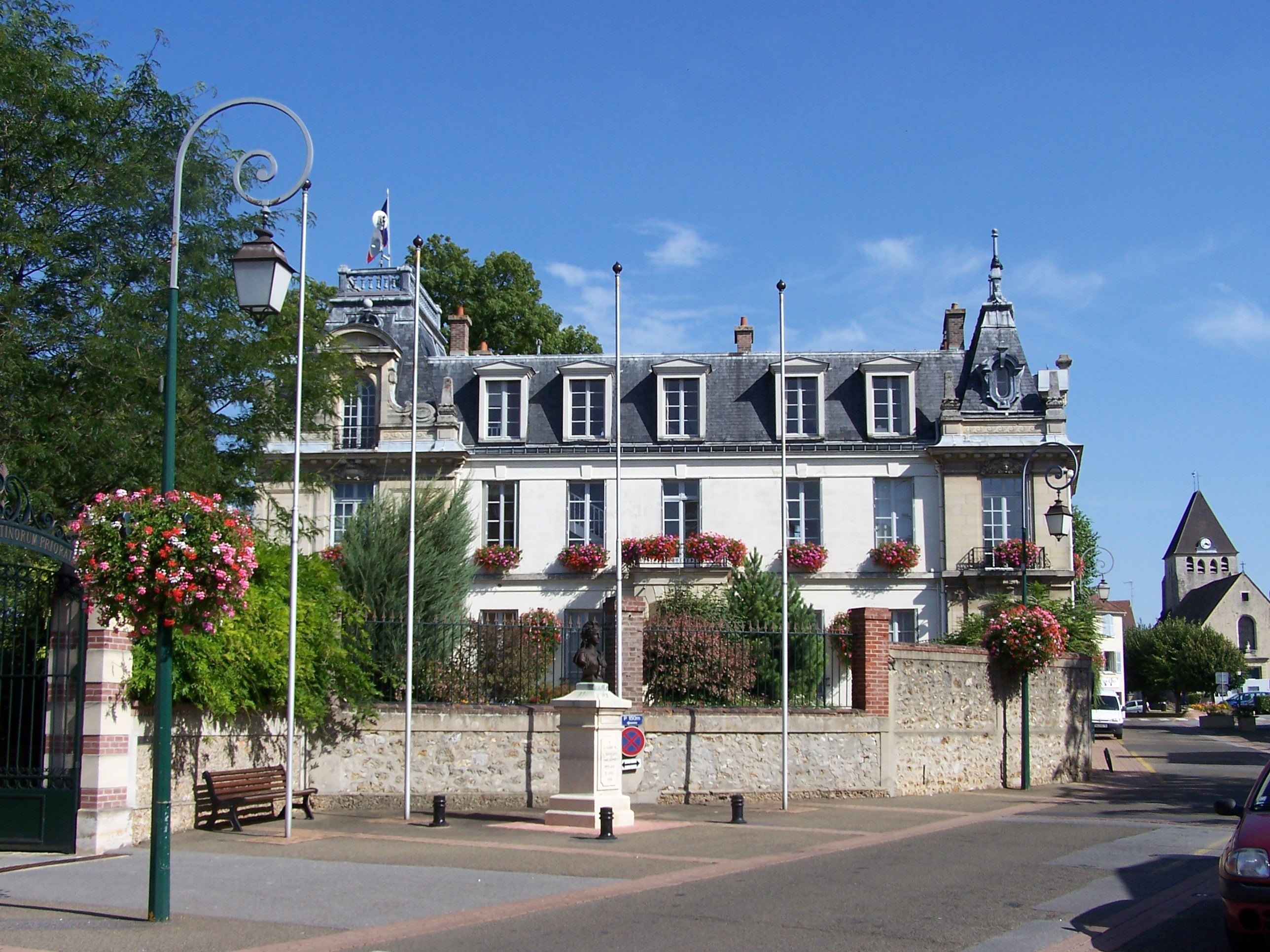
The Hôtel de Ville

Plaisir has managed to preserve its twelfth century church. Its varied territory is characterised by large agricultural plains, many green spaces and a forest area that together occupy half of its surface.

The Hôtel de Ville was completed in 1895.

Between 1968 and 1990, Plaisir has seen explosive growth in its population, but since then, the town's policy has been to contain growth and aim for stabilisation, in order to main the local quality of living as well as the natural spaces (forests and agricultural lands).

It has a major shopping mall that is still expanding. This commercial activity has been a boon for local tax revenues, but also led to congestion of its roads.

Aside from this commercial activity, Plaisir is also home to a number of other activities, for instance it is home to the Zodiaxc corporation and hosts the Lenôtre culinary school which attracts students from across the globe.

== Population ==
The inhabitants are called Plaisirois.

Historical population

Year	Pop.	±% p.a.
1793	1,260	—
1800	1,313	+0.59%
1806	1,291	−0.28%
1821	1,260	−0.16%
1831	1,215	−0.36%
1836	1,274	+0.95%
1841	1,259	−0.24%
1846	1,178	−1.32%
1851	1,095	−1.45%
1856	1,117	+0.40%
1861	1,182	+1.14%
1866	1,225	+0.72%
1872	1,265	+0.54%
1876	1,374	+2.09%
1881	1,469	+1.35%
1886	1,579	+1.45%
1891	1,615	+0.45%
1896	1,636	+0.26%
1901	1,652	+0.19%

Year	Pop.	±% p.a.
1906	1,729	+0.92%
1911	1,894	+1.84%
1921	1,900	+0.03%
1926	2,085	+1.88%
1931	2,167	+0.77%
1936	2,224	+0.52%
1946	2,398	+0.76%
1954	2,683	+1.41%
1962	3,850	+4.62%
1968	6,869	+10.13%
1975	21,259	+17.51%
1982	22,593	+0.87%
1990	25,877	+1.71%
1999	31,045	+2.04%
2007	30,937	−0.04%
2012	31,119	+0.12%
2017	31,419	+0.19%
2023	31,811	+0.21%

Source: EHESS and INSEE (1968-2023)

== Transport ==
Plaisir is served by two stations on the Transilien Paris-Montparnasse suburban rail line: Plaisir – Les Clayes and Plaisir – Grignon

== Education ==
The commune has 17 preschools with 1,560 students and 13 elementary schools with 2,273 students, with a total of 3,843 students.

Secondary schools in Plaisir:

- Collège Guillaume-Apollinaire
- Collège Blaise-Pascal et SEGPA
- Lycée Jean Vilar

Secondary schools in nearby municipalities:

- Collège La-Fosse-aux-Dames (Les Clayes-sous-Bois)
- Collège La-Clef-de-Saint-Pierre (Elancourt)

== Twin towns ==
Plaisir is twinned with Lowestoft, England and Bad Aussee, Austria.

== See also ==
- Communes of the Yvelines department
