= Hôtel de Ville, Plaisir =

Town hall in Plaisir, France

Hôtel de Ville
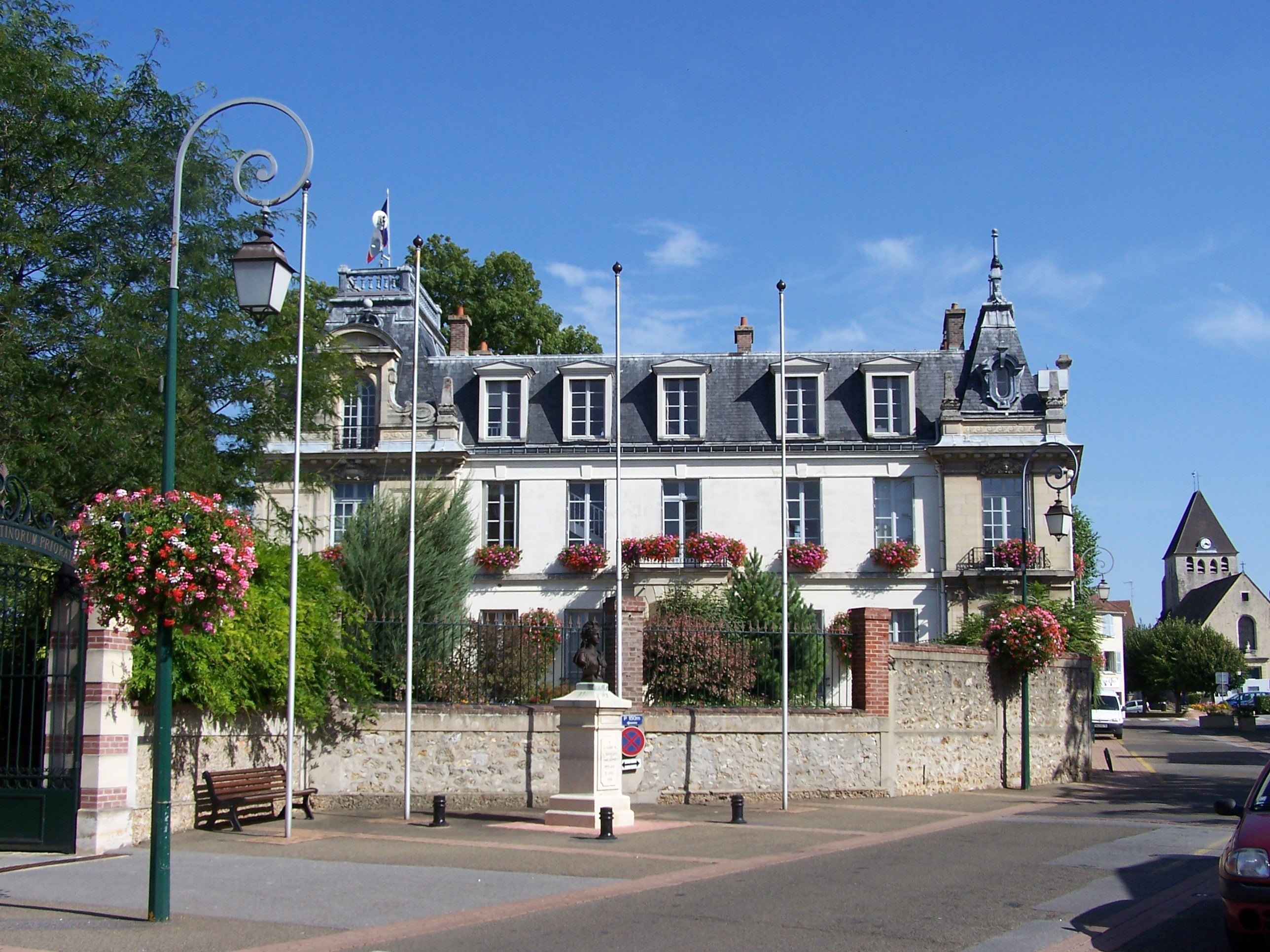
- The main frontage of the Hôtel de Ville in September 2006
- Interactive map of the Hôtel de Ville area

General information
- Type: City hall
- Architectural style: Neoclassical style
- Location: Plaisir, France
- Coordinates: 48.8172°N 1.9478°E
- Completed: 1895

The Hôtel de Ville (French pronunciation: [otɛl də vil], City Hall) is a municipal building in Plaisir, Yvelines, in the western suburbs of Paris, standing on Rue Pasteur.

== History ==
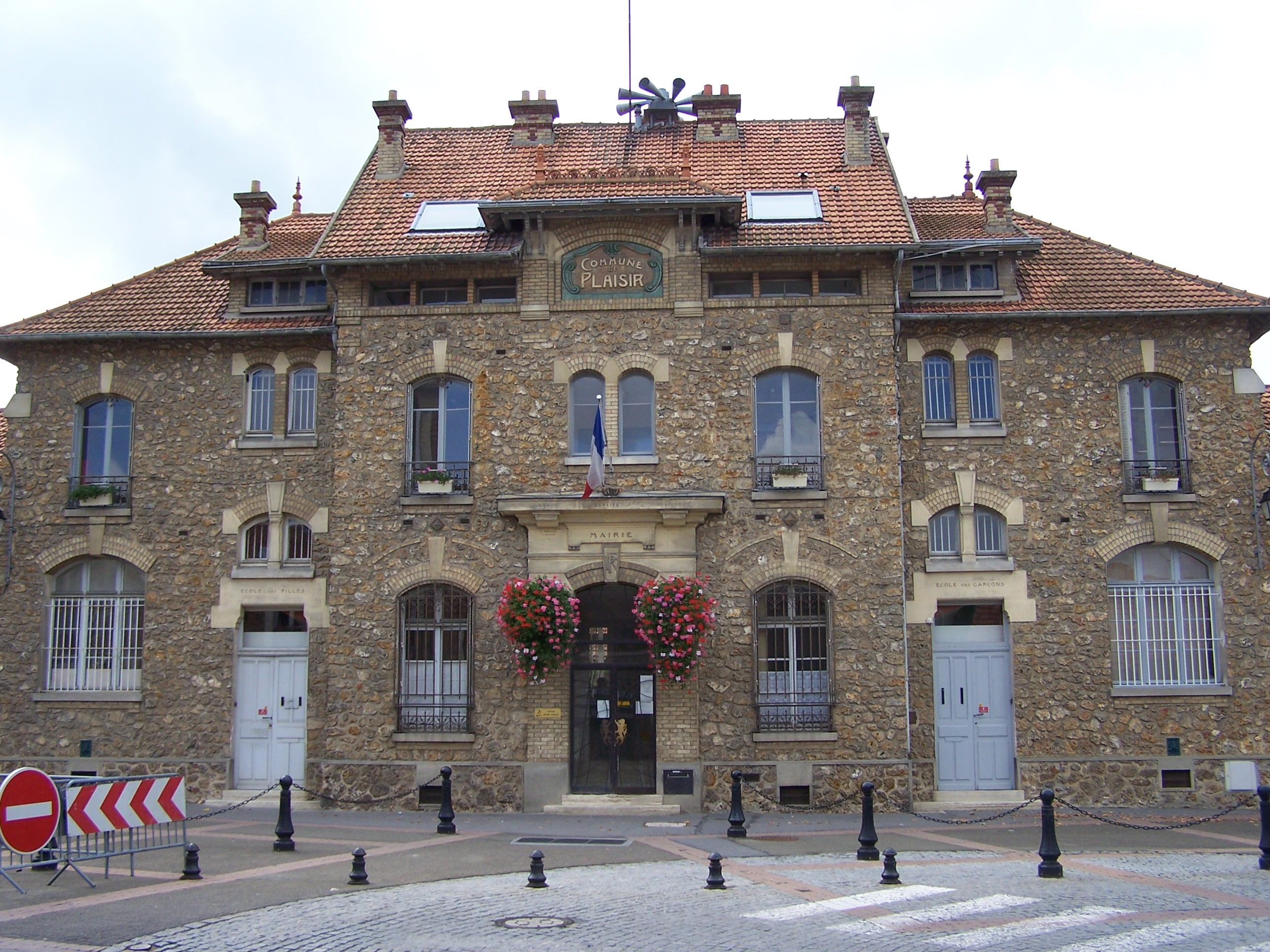
The old town hall

Following the French Revolution, the town council initially met in the house of the mayor at the time. This arrangement continued until the second half of the 19th century, when the council decided to establish a combined town hall and school on the south side of Rue Pasteur. The building was designed in the neoclassical style and built from millstone. The design involved a symmetrical main frontage of seven bays facing onto Rue Pasteur. The central section of three bays, which was slightly projected forward, featured a round headed doorway with brick voussoirs and a keystone flanked by brick pilasters supporting an entablature and a cornice. There was a pair of small rounded headed windows on the first floor and a panel, which was inscribed with the words "Commune Plaisir", above. The outer bays of the central section were fenestrated by rounded headed windows with brick voussoirs and keystones. The wings of two bays each contained doorways in the inner bays (girls on the left and boys on the right) and were fenestrated in a similar style.

A bust of Marianne was created by the sculptor, Angelo Francia, and placed on a pedestal facing the town hall in 1904, and an extension for the Salle du Conseil (council chamber) was added later at the rear of the building.

In 1971, after a significant increase in the population largely due to the arrival of the transport business, Hesnault, and the scientific research business, Bertin, the council decided to acquire larger premises. The site they selected had been occupied by the Priory of Notre-Dame, which was managed by the Benedictines and dated from the 8th century. After the revolution, the priory was seized by the state, the monks were driven out and the building was acquired by Charles René Henri de Bauclas, who served as mayor in the late 18th century. The building was surrounded by a large park which was landscaped by Messrs. Blandin and Olivier, with grottos, rockeries and a large fountain, between 1873 and 1893. The priory was demolished in the late 19th century, and a large private house was erected on the site. The house was designed in the neoclassical style, built in ashlar stone and was completed in 1895.

The design of the house involved an asymmetrical main frontage of seven bays facing towards Rue Jules Verne. The central section of five bays, which were whitewashed, featured a porch, formed by square columns supporting an entablature and a balcony. The central section was fenestrated by plain casement windows on the first two floors and by dormer windows at attic level. The end bays, which were slightly projected forward, were more elaborately decorated at attic level: the left-hand bay featured a rounded headed window, which was supported by scrolls, surmounted by a segmental pediment and flanked by finials. The right-hand bay featured a steep pyramid-shaped roof, which contained an oculus and was flanked by finials. Internally, the principal room was a large reception room which was later converted for use as the Bureau du Maire (mayor's office).
