= Les Clayes-sous-Bois =

- Commune
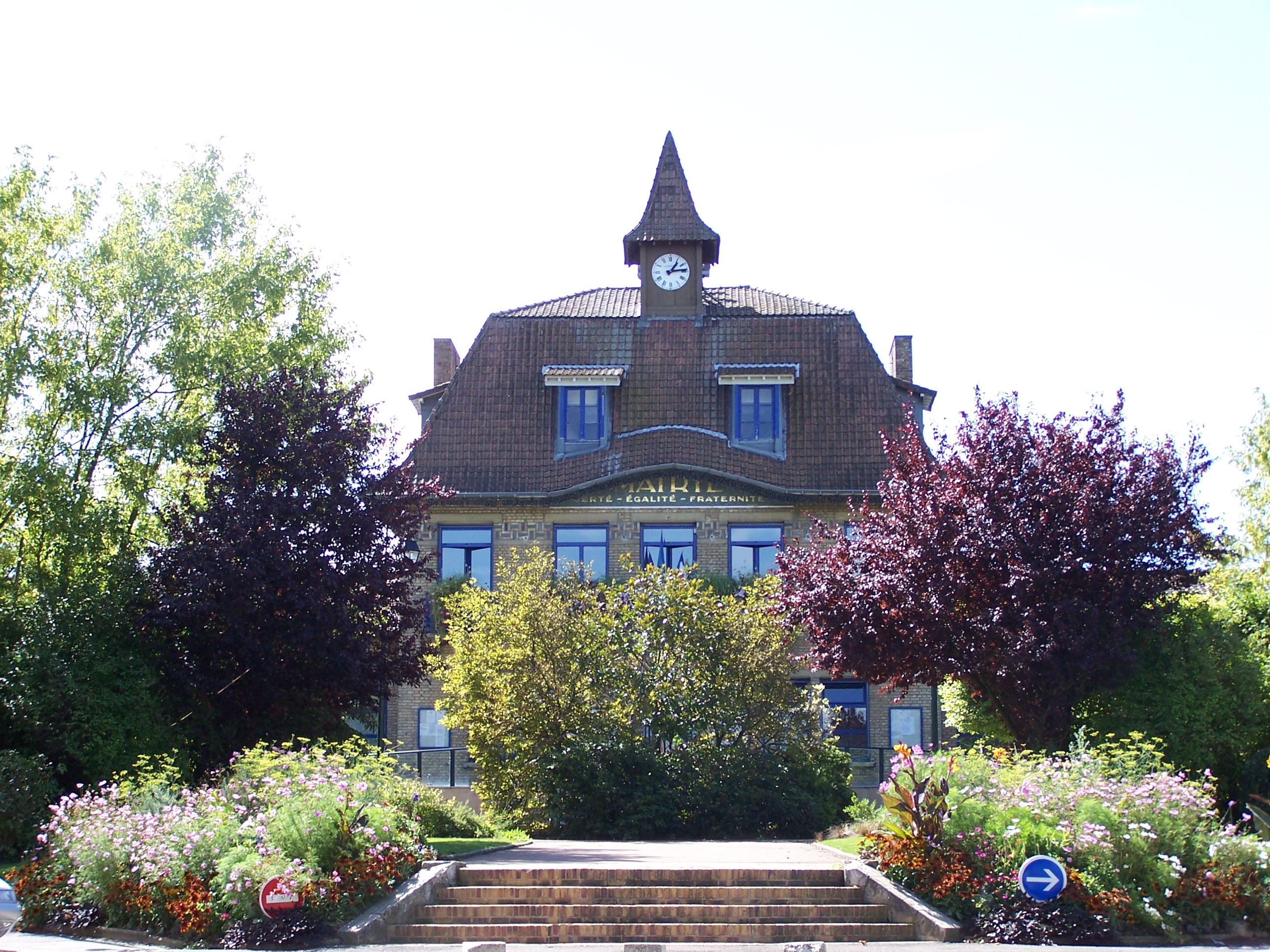
- The town hall in Les Clayes-sous-Bois

- Coat of arms

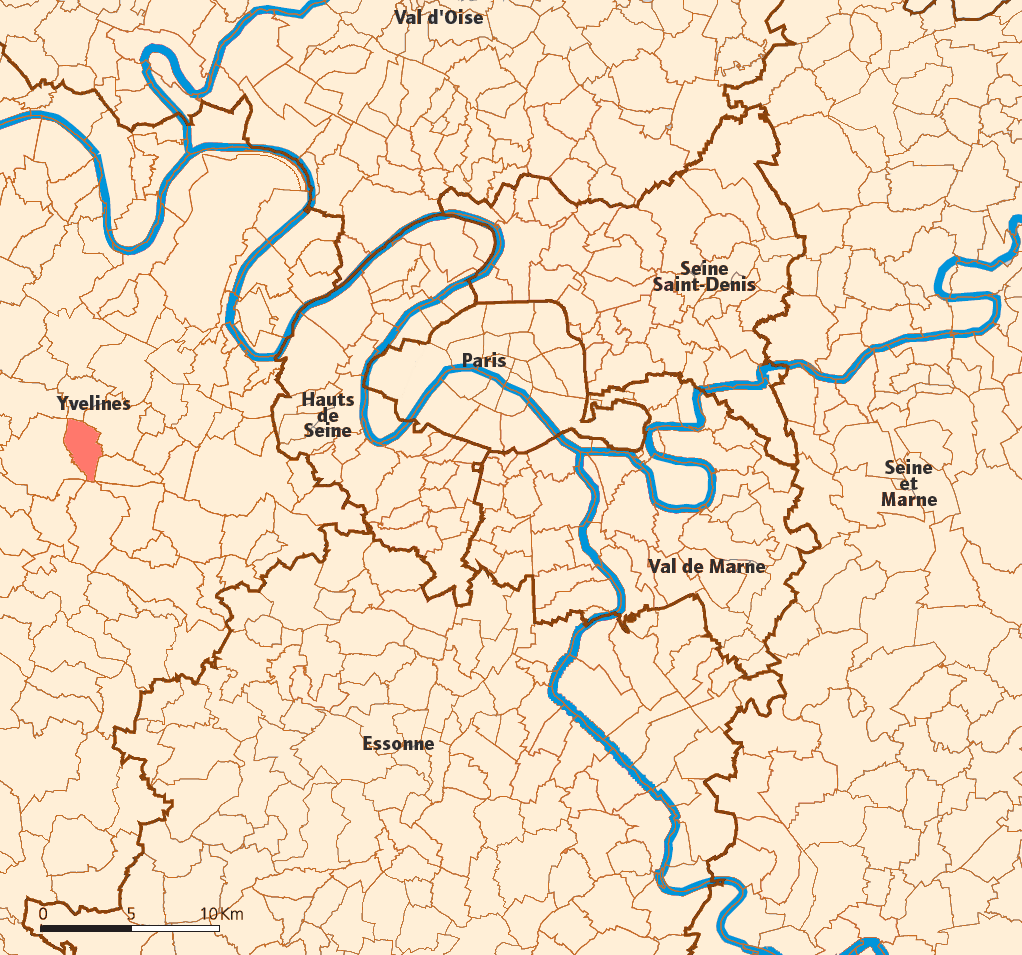
- Location (in red) within Paris inner and outer suburbs
- Location of Les Clayes-sous-Bois
- Location within France Location within Île-de-France (region)
- Coordinates: 48°49′00″N 1°59′00″E
- Country: France
- Region: Île-de-France
- Department: Yvelines
- Arrondissement: Versailles
- Canton: Plaisir
- Intercommunality: Saint-Quentin-en-Yvelines

Government
  - Mayor (2020–2026): Philippe Guiguen
- Area^{1}: 6.11 km^{2} (2.36 sq mi)
- Population (2023): 16,804
  - Density: 2,750/km^{2} (7,120/sq mi)
- Time zone: UTC+01:00 (CET)
  - Summer (DST): UTC+02:00 (CEST)
- INSEE/Postal code: 78165 /78340
- ^{1} French Land Register data, which excludes lakes, ponds, glaciers > 1 km^{2} (0.386 sq mi or 247 acres) and river estuaries.

Les Clayes-sous-Bois (French pronunciation: [le klɛ su bwa]) is a commune in the Yvelines department in the Île-de-France region in north-central France. It is located in the western suburbs of Paris 26.7 km (16.6 mi) from the center.

== Geography ==
The commune of Les Clayes-sous-Bois is located about 14 km from Versailles and 30 km from Paris, in the southwest of the Versailles plain. The commune is highly urbanized, with mostly single-family housing, except for the southern part of the commune, which is covered by a part of the Bois-d'Arcy forest.

It borders the cities of Chavenay, Villepreux, Bois-d'Arcy, Trappes and Plaisir.

The commune is irrigated in the South by the Maldroit river, a tributary of the Mauldre.

It is located entirely in the Mauldre watershed, managed since 1992 by the COBAHMA, under the aegis of the Yvelines General Council, and for which a water development and management plan (SAGE) has been implemented. However, it is partially in the Maldroit sub-basin (south and west) and for the rest (north-east) in the rivulet de Gally sub-basin, although not crossed by the rivulet itself.

== Economy ==
Les Clayes-sous-Bois, like most towns in the Île-de-France region, has a large number of businesses (619), mainly in commerce and services, located in five industrial and commercial zones. One of the most important of these is a Atos/Bull computer center.

Three regional shopping centers to the north of the municipality, bordering the railroad tracks, constitute the other most important areas with Alpha Park, Alpha Park 2 and One Nation Paris (an outlet of luxury stores opened in late 2013).

Located on Avenue du Général-Leclerc, the communal market is open on Thursdays and Sundays from 8 a.m. to 1 p.m.44

In 2010, the median fiscal income per household was €37.589, which ranked Les Clayes-sous-Bois 4.075th among the 31.525 municipalities with more than 39 households in metropolitan France.

== Policy and population ==
After being part of the group of communes of the West Paris region, Les Clayes-sous-Bois became part of the Saint-Quentin-en-Yvelines agglomeration community on 1 January 2016

=== Twinnings ===
The twinning with Röthenbach was established by the mayors André Boulay and Karl Fischer in 1964, one year after the signature of the "Élysée Treaty", a friendship treaty signed at the Élysée Palace by the German chancellor Konrad Adenauer and the French president Charles de Gaulle.The group of "the Friends of the Woods" already existed since 1962, it organized meetings between the young people of the two cities. In 1964, immediately afterward, a twinning committee was created. On Easter 1965, a soccer match between the teams of the two towns took place. In October 1995, the 30th anniversary of the twinning was celebrated with discussions between veterans and the organization of painting exhibitions and tennis matches. In September 1999, the Twinning Committee introduced German classes in the "Maison des jeunes et de la culture des Clayes " (Youth Center of the town). In both cities, the Twinning Committee initiated language classes, trips, youth exchanges between schools and between artists, as well as other activities such as : petanque tournament on July 14 and meetings between the firemen of both cities. The city is also twinned with the city of Ponte da Barca (Portugal) since 2002.

=== Population ===
The inhabitants of Les Clayes-sous-Bois are called Clétiens in French.

Historical population
Year	Pop.	±% p.a.
1968	9,954	—
1975	14,695	+5.72%
1982	17,158	+2.24%
1990	16,819	−0.25%
1999	17,059	+0.16%
2007	17,275	+0.16%
2012	17,658	+0.44%
2017	17,636	−0.02%
2023	16,804	−0.80%
Source: INSEE

The population of the commune is slightly older than the average of Yvelines.

Population by age of Les Clayes-sous-Bois, 2023 (%)

80+	5.4
65–79	13.5
55–64	12.7
40–54	20.8
25–39	17.5
15–24	11.7
0–14	18.4

Total: 100

male

female

Source: INSEE

Population by age of Yvelines, 2023 (%)

90+	5
75–89	11.9
60–74	12
45–59	20.7
30–44	18.6
15–29	12.2
0–14	19.8

Total: 100.2

male

female

Source: INSEE

== History ==
=== Prehistory ===
Prehistoric elements such as carved axes and bronze bracelets have been discovered on the site of Les Clayes and are now exhibited in the national archaeology museum of Saint-Germain-en-Laye, testifying its occupation since prehistoric times.

=== Middle Ages ===
A stone path, of which there are still vestiges, passed through the village. It is nowadays the "Chemin aux Bœufs" ( the Oxen Road) . As its name indicates, this secondary road was used for cattle transport from Normandy; the animals were then inspected in Chavenay and put on sale at the Poissy and Saint-Germain-en-Laye markets .

In the Middle Ages, the partition of the territory of the old Roman Empire began, giving rise to fiefdoms ruled by lords; in exchange for the protection of the latter, the peasants could cultivate their lands in security.

At the beginning of the 12th century, the lands of Clais (old name of the city) belonged to Simon de Cloyes. In 1118, he had a castle built near the church. The church was built on the upper part of the village under the reign of Philip I . Excavations carried out in 1875 during the construction of the enclosing wall of the Saint-Martin cemetery revealed a forgotten cellar that belonged to the castle. In 1160, the bishop of Chartres, Robert III, assign the parish of Les Clayes to the abbey of Saint-Cyr, which was confirmed by Pope Alexander III in a bull three years later.

In 1357, the troops of the King of Navarre, Charles le Mauvais, settled for three months in the villages of Les Clayes, Villepreux and Trappes, plundering the parishes. A battle between the French royal troops and those of the King of Navarre took place east of the village, in a valley known as "Près Bataille" (Before Battle). In 1360, the king's squire Pierre Potel had a seigniorial hotel built in the south of the village : a hunting lodge near the Bois d'Arcy forest. The south wing, the only vestige since 1790, now houses the municipal library. This hotel was built in the Val Gally area, on the site of a country house belonging to the nuns of Notre-Dame-des-Anges de Saint-Cyr, which was burned down during the occupation of Charles le Mauvais. The seigniorial mansion was a square surrounded by a double enclosure, a defensive wall and ditches which remained until 1866, when they were filled in by Mr. Martignon.

In 1368, the lands of the Clayes belonged to Jean de Meslindon, ally of the Villeneuve family until 1517. Then to four other owners: Lambert Maigret, comptroller general, André Leroy, notary and secretary of François I, Gaillard Spifaine, Comptroller General of Finance and Guillaume Poyet, Second President of the Parliament of Paris.

=== Modern times ===
In 1537 the seigneury of “Clais” was confiscated from its indebted owner, Gaillard Spifaine, and returned to the king of France. On 24 December 1546 Anne de Pisseleu, favorite of François I, obtains from her lover the lands of “ Clayes”, of which she becomes the chatelaine.

In 1556, Diane de Poitiers, mistress of Henri II, became the owner, ten years after Anne de Pisseleu was exiled and the seigneury confiscated in favor of the new king. Diane uses it as a hunting relay. The king's mistress also planted the famous «tree of Diana» in the parc. The domain passed on to his daughter Françoise de Brézé, who sold it to François Coignet, notary and secretary to the seigneur of Pontchartrain.

In 1573, a year before ascending to the throne, the future Henry III put the Château of Clais under royal protection. A trace remains above a door of the main body of the former hunting relay: it is a «safeguard», a plate representing a shield or a blazon, on which are engraved three lilies surrounded by a necklace of the Saint-Laurent Michel order with a crown sit on top it .

In 1578, in a letter the Bishop of Chartres Nicolas de Thou wrote: “We have the humble plea of the villagers and inhabitants of the Clais, in our diocese dedicated and consecrated to God the church built under the invocation of Saint Martin where the relics of the arm of Saint Margaret are kept”. Under the Ancien Régime (“Old Regime”), the parish of Clais was supposed to receive one-tenth of the crop of the Saint Cyr abbess, but in reality, the parish priests received only a small part of it, the majority remaining in the hands of the ecclesiastics.

=== Contemporary era ===
==== The French Revolution ====
At the beginning of the French Revolution, cahiers de doléances were written. The Cletians asked for "the abolition of seigneurial rights, the abolition of the captaincies forbidding them to hunt and the opening of a road from Les Clayes to Saint-Cyr to obtain provisions and trade". The first local council was elected on 26 March 1791. On 20 November 1791 the parish priest Le Duc was relieved of his duties as mayor and replaced by Nicolas Barré, prosecutor of the town. In October 1793, one of the two bells of the church was sent to the cannon foundry. On the 11th of February 1793, Catholic worship ceased and the church's silver ornaments and vases were donated for the "support of the Republic". A part of the old seigniorial castle was destroyed. Only the south wing remains today.

==== The Clayes castle ====
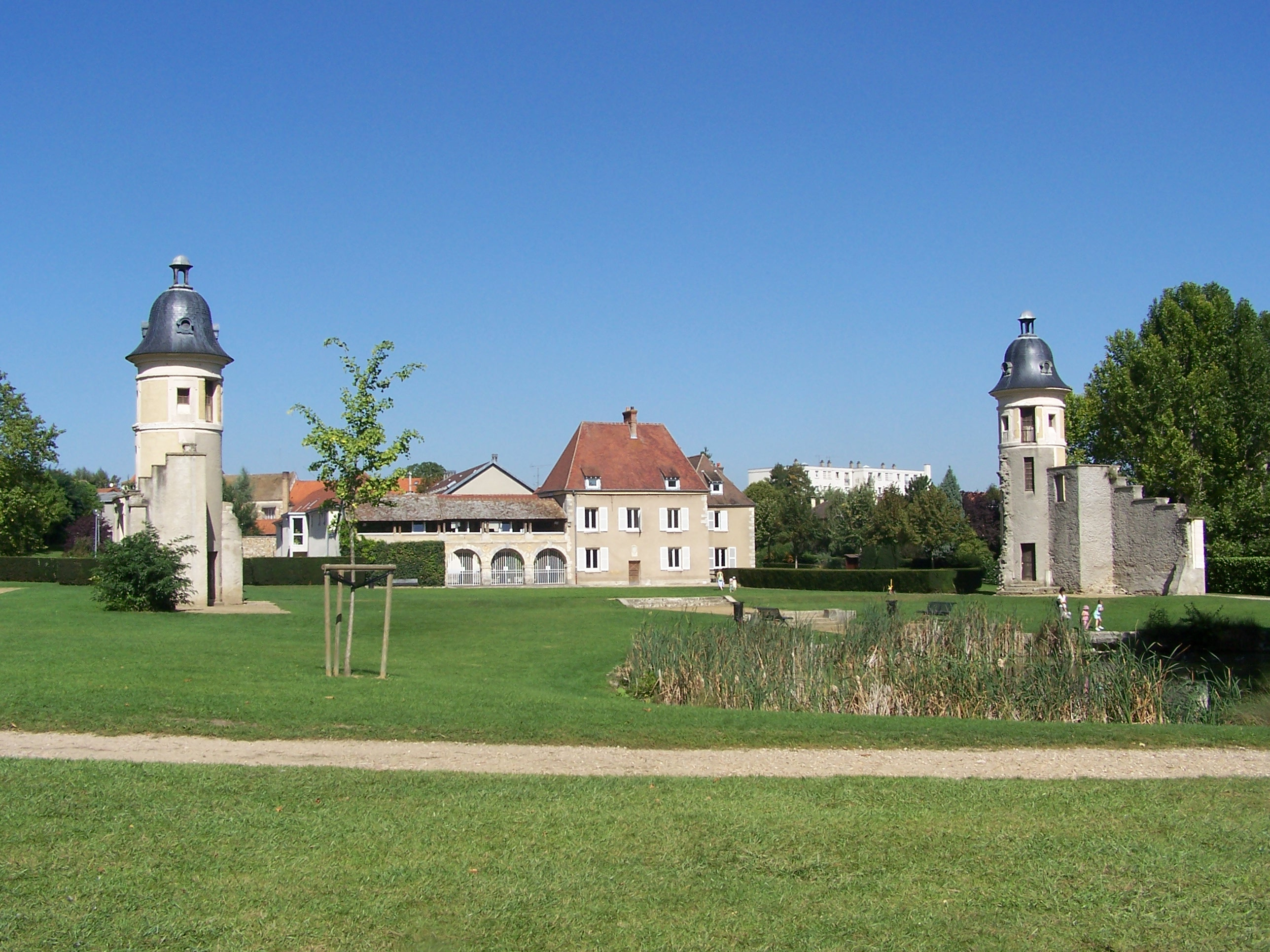
Chateau of Les Clayes-sous-Bois

In front of the old hunting lodge, a new neo-classical castle was built between 1800 and 1816 by the Delaborne family, landowners in Villepreux. A chapel was also built and the outbuildings were added to the old segniorial house.

Made of stone and brick, the building's façade is rectangular, framed by two circular towers and roofs pierced by four oeil-de-boeuf windows. The pediments of the slate roof are triangular and the upper floor windows have railings; a belfry adorned with a clock is installed in the middle of the roof, symbolizing the power of the building while Les Clayes lacked a real town hall. The chapel is topped by a tapered roof and a cross. In 1819, the son of the Delabornes added the large gate that marks the entrance of the domain. In the 20th century, the castle changed hands several times. Madame Bloch-Levallois bought the castle at Clayes in 1915, followed in the 1920s by Jeanne Pata de Montagnac (1882-1966), an amateur lyric singer known for her beauty, who sang in the Parisian musical salon of Marguerite de Saint-Marceaux. Having divorced Maximilian von Jaunez, she began restoring Clayes, but sold it after her remarriage in 1925 to Charles de Polignac. In 1926, the art dealers Lucy and Jos Hessel acquired the castle, which played host to their illustrious guests, among them the writer Tristan Bernard, the painter Édouard Vuillard, and the politician Léon Blum.

==== From rural houses to new housing. ====
Until the beginning of the 20th century, Les Clayes was a small rural village of barely 300 inhabitants. The commune was 612 hectares, on which five farms distributed 586 hectares of cultivated land, mostly cereals, sugar beets and fruit trees. The "ferme du château" (castle farm) was located at the corner of rue Henri-Langlois and rue Henri-Prou, where a period courtyard can still be found todayRue Henri-Prou, then called "chemin de Grande communication" and linking Les Clayes to Versailles and Neauphles (towns with which most of the commune's agricultural trade took place), was the main axis of the village, where communal life took place, with the church and the first town hall in its center, located in the former presbytery. In this street, there are still some typical buildings from the XIX and early XX centuries: village houses with simple gypsum block facades and a few town houses, made of millstone, with a much more refined architecture.

Between the 1870s and the 1930s, the industrialization of the region, the demographic growth and the densification of the means of transportation also led to the multiplication of the construction of small houses overflowing the historical center, bringing to Les Clayes a new population, well-to-do and then working class, prefiguring what would be called the suburbs. The arrival of the train in 1861 greatly favored these changes (see Villepreux - Les Clayes station). The new railroad connections brought many former villages within reach of the Parisians, and the wealthier ones sought to build second homes there.

The present town hall was built in 1930. It is inserted in a complex of buildings that also includes a school, in order to accommodate the growing school population. The facade of the building still preserves on its side alleys the trace of its entrances: boys' school at the Robert-Desnos path and girls' school at the 19-March-1962 path. At the end of the latter lane, now replaced by the André-Briquet nursery school, there were bathhouses. In the past, a square was installed in front of the town hall; it was named after Léon Blum. Rearranged in the 2000s, it was replaced by an open square named after Charles de Gaulle.

=== From WWII until today ===
In August 1944, at the end of the Second World War, the castle and its chapel were burned by the German troops at their departure. Only the two side towers with their bells and the outbuildings remained unharmed in the burning. During the Second World War, a group of young Cletiens Resistance fighter from the" Organisation Civile et Militaire (OCM)" were engaged against the German occupation. In 1947, at the city hall, André Biret was decorated with the "Liberation" medal.

In 1945, Charlotte Célerié, a member of the French Communist Party (FCP), was elected mayor; she was one of the first women mayors in France. Les Clayes-sous-Bois is indeed for many decades a left-wing town, Henri Prou (FCP) mayor from 1935 to 1939, André Boulay from 1959 to 1965 then Jean Sergeant (FCP) from 1965 to 1977 and Janine Thomas (FCP) from 1977 to 2001.Since 2001, the city has been led by center-right mayors (Véronique Coté-Millard from 2001 to 2020, then succeeded by Philippe Guiguen).

== Culture ==
=== Sites and monuments ===
==== The St Martin Church ====
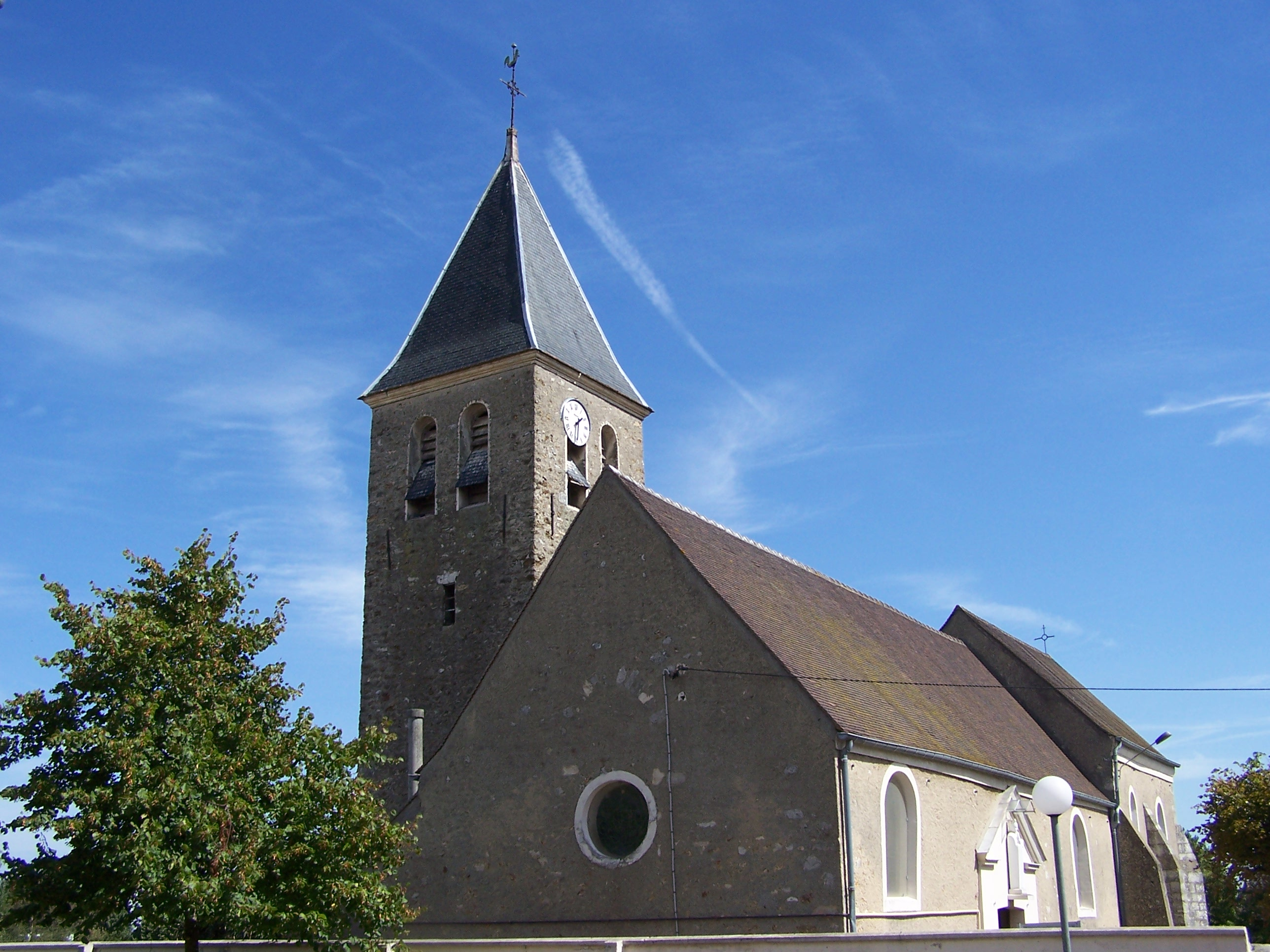
Saint-Martin church

It is the oldest building in the commune. Its nave dates from the 11th century, the choir and the sanctuary from the 14th and 15th centuries. Like many small village churches, it does not have a cross-shaped plan. It has several Romanesque elements such as small round bay windows and a narrow, low limestone nave, as well as a vault with arches, but it has only one side aisle, whereas churches usually have a second one. Sculpted in the 11th century, a headstone supports the tabernacle. The church also has Gothic elements such as : the vault of the choir, a ribbed vault, as well as a bay windows with three lancet arches), dating from the 14th-15th centuries. It is thus a mixt of Romanesque and Gothic styles. There is a statue of the Virgin and Child from the 15th century, registered in the departmental inventory of historical monuments. The original bell tower was destroyed during the Hundred Years' War and was later rebuilt. The church was dedicated to Saint Martin during the reign of Henri III.In the 16th century, a wooden cartouche carved with the Roman numeral "1500" ("MC") was placed above the door of the sacristy. In the same century or the following one, frescoes were painted on the pillars of the nave. A baptismal font made of pink marble with a copper cover dating from the 17th and 18th centuries was also installed. All these elements are still visible today.

Around 1750, a bell named Anne Françoise Martin was placed in the bell tower. The cemetery located below the church (called the Saint-Martin cemetery) was inaugurated in 1858. In 1949, after the Second World War and the church threatened to fall into ruins, a restoration campaign was organized. In 1950, a statue of Saint Martin by Marcel Sprank was installed on the pediment of the entrance portal. A tribune was placed at the back of the nave; it was removed in 1999. In 1993, after a plastering, the frame of a large stained glass window was unveiled. The "Ateliers Loire" (Loire workshops) were then asked to design new stained glass windows for this frame and the other windows of the building.

==== The Hunting lodge ====
The hunting lodge from the 14th century was built on the ruins of a house destroyed during a troubled period (Hundred Years' War, Black Death). This house belonged to the nuns of Notre-Dame-des-Anges de Saint-Cyr (Benedictine order), who sold the remains of the building to the king's squire Pierre Potel, in 1360 . Pierre Potel built an imposing square-shaped hunting lodge, with the east facing facade, surrounded by a ditch (filled in in 1866), while a wall surrounds the park. Over the centuries, the building and its domain changed hands among officers of the crown and members of the Parliament of Paris.

The facade and roofs of the hunting lodge are listed in the supplementary inventory of historical monuments in 1872. The south wing of the building is the last vestige, the other parts having been destroyed in 1790. It currently houses the municipal library

==== The presbytery and cemeteries ====
The presbytery located in front of the church was built between 1719 and 1745 at the request of the parish priest of Les Clayes, Jean-Louis Lauzy, and at his own expense, in order to provide a classroom for the children of the village.

The commune has three cemeteries: the Saint-Martin cemetery (rue Henri-Prou, behind the church), the Henri-Prou cemetery (opposite the swimming pool) and the Broderie cemetery (chemin de la Bretechelle).

==== The Diane's Park ====
Its name refers to the king's mistress Diane de Poitiers who lived in the hunting lodge of les Clayes.

In the park remains the vestige of the Clayes's castle : only the two lateral towers surmounted by a lantern remain and its outbuildings, integrated into the remains of the old hunting lodge (the library), now host exhibitions and associative and festive activities.

The park of Diana has been listed as a cultural heritage site since 31 July 2003. In addition to the two towers of the old castle, its main attraction is the Diane tree:a 450-year-old plane tree, known as the "tree of Diana", received in 2000 the label of remarkable tree of France by the association A.R.B.R.E.S. It would have been planted around 1556, by the mistress of King Henri II of France.

A pond is located in front of the terrace of the old castle and, further west, another pond is crossed by a small wooden bridge. It was once lined with a wooden kiosk.

== Education ==
Preschools

- André Briquet
- Le Chêne Sorcier
- René Coty
- Nouveau Cottage

Primary schools:

- Marcel Pagnol
- Jean Jaurès
- Henri Prou
- Victor Hugo
- René Coty
- Paul Eluard

The commune has two junior high schools: La-Fosse-aux-Dames and Anatole France. Lycée Jean-Vilar in Plaisir and Lycée Sonia Delaunay in Villepreux are nearby.

== Transport ==
Les Clayes-sous-Bois is served by Villepreux–Les Clayes station on the Transilien Line N suburban rail line and by an efficient bus station that links the town to Versailles, Saint-Quentin-en-Yvelines and a few other communes around.

== See also ==
- Communes of the Yvelines department
