= February 10 =

February 10 this year in various calendars
- Tuesday, 10 February 2026
Other calendars
Akan	Fobene
Armenian	25 Mehekani 1475
Aztec	Etzalcualiztli 11, 6 Quiyahuitl
Babylonian	21 Tebetu, 2336 SE
Balinese pawukon	Menga, Pasah, Jaya, Pon, Tungleh, Anggara of Menail, Guru, Dangu, Pandita
Bengali	27 Magh, BS 1432
Chinese	Yin Wood Rabbit・Tail Mansion; 23 Làyuè, Yǐsìnián (Lichun, 8 days until Yushui)
Common Era	10 February 2026 CE
Coptic	3 Meshir, AM 1742
Egyptian	30 Payni, 2774 NE
Ethiopian	3 Yakātit, 2018 Amätä Məhrät
French Republican	Décade III, Duodi de Pluviôse de l'Année 234 de la République
Gregorian	10 February, AD 2026
Hebrew	23 Shevat, AM 5786
Hindu	Viśākhā・Vṛddhi; Solar: 28 Māgha, 1947 SE; Lunisolar: Adhika Aṣṭamī, Kṛishna pakṣa of Māgha, 2082 VE; Siddhārthin・5126 KY・1,872,616
Icelandic	Þriðjudagur, 19 Þorri 2025
Islamic	22 Sha'aban, AH 1447 (using tabular method)
ISO week date	2026-W07-2
Japanese	23 Shiwasu, Reiwa 8 (Risshun, 9 days until Usui)
Julian	28 January, AD 2026 (AM 7534)
Julian day	2461082
Maya	13.0.13.5.19; 17 Pax, 6 Cauac
Roman	ante diem V Kalendas Februarias, MMDCCLXXIX AUC
Solar Hijri	21 Bahman, SH 1404
Tibetan	24 rgyal, shing mo sbrul 2152 or 1771 or 999

<<	February					>>
Su	Mo	Tu	We	Th	Fr	Sa
1	2	3	4	5	6	7
8	9	10	11	12	13	14
15	16	17	18	19	20	21
22	23	24	25	26	27	28
2026

February 10 in recent years
2026 (Tuesday)
2025 (Monday)
2024 (Saturday)
2023 (Friday)
2022 (Thursday)
2021 (Wednesday)
2020 (Monday)
2019 (Sunday)
2018 (Saturday)
2017 (Friday)

February 10 is the 41st day of the year in the Gregorian calendar; 324 days remain until the end of the year (325 in leap years).

== Events ==
=== Pre-1600 ===
- 1258 – The Siege of Baghdad ends with the surrender of the last Abbasid caliph to Hulegu Khan, a prince of the Mongol Empire.
- 1306 – In front of the high altar of Greyfriars Church in Dumfries, Robert the Bruce murders John Comyn, sparking the revolution in the Wars of Scottish Independence.
- 1355 – The St Scholastica Day riot breaks out in Oxford, England, leaving 63 scholars and perhaps 30 locals dead in two days.
- 1392 – Byzantine Emperor Manuel II Palaiologos marries Helena Dragaš, daughter of the Serbian Prince Constantine Dragaš. She is crowned as empress the following day.
- 1502 – Vasco da Gama sets sail from Lisbon, Portugal, on his second voyage to India.
- 1567 – Lord Darnley, second husband of Mary, Queen of Scots, is found strangled following an explosion at the Kirk o' Field house in Edinburgh, Scotland, a suspected assassination.

=== 1601–1900 ===
- 1712 – Huilliches in Chiloé rebel against Spanish encomenderos.
- 1763 – French and Indian War: The Treaty of Paris ends the war and France cedes Quebec to Great Britain.
- 1814 – Napoleonic Wars: The Battle of Champaubert ends in French victory over the Russians and the Prussians.
- 1840 – Queen Victoria of the United Kingdom marries Prince Albert of Saxe-Coburg and Gotha.
- 1846 – First Anglo-Sikh War: Battle of Sobraon: British defeat Sikhs in the final battle of the war.
- 1861 – Jefferson Davis is notified by telegraph that he has been chosen as provisional President of the Confederate States of America.
- 1862 – American Civil War: A Union naval flotilla destroys the bulk of the Confederate Mosquito Fleet in the Battle of Elizabeth City on the Pasquotank River in North Carolina.

=== 1901–present ===
- 1906 – HMS Dreadnought, the first of a revolutionary new breed of battleships, is christened.
- 1920 – Józef Haller de Hallenburg performs the symbolic wedding of Poland to the sea, celebrating restitution of Polish access to open sea.
- 1920 – About 75% of the population in Zone I votes to join Denmark in the 1920 Schleswig plebiscites.
- 1923 – Texas Tech University is founded as Texas Technological College in Lubbock, Texas.
- 1930 – The Việt Nam Quốc Dân Đảng launches the failed Yên Bái mutiny in hope of overthrowing French protectorate over Vietnam.
- 1933 – In round 13 of a boxing match at New York City's Madison Square Garden, Primo Carnera knocks out Ernie Schaaf. Schaaf dies four days later.
- 1936 – Second Italo-Abyssinian War: Italian troops launch the Battle of Amba Aradam against Ethiopian defenders.
- 1939 – Spanish Civil War: The Nationalists conclude their conquest of Catalonia and seal the border with France.
- 1940 – The Soviet Union begins mass deportations of Polish citizens from occupied eastern Poland to Siberia.
- 1943 – World War II: Attempting to completely lift the Siege of Leningrad, the Soviet Red Army engages German troops and Spanish volunteers in the Battle of Krasny Bor.
- 1947 – The Paris Peace Treaties are signed by Italy, Romania, Hungary, Bulgaria, Finland and the Allies of World War II.
- 1954 – U.S. President Dwight D. Eisenhower warns against United States intervention in Vietnam.
- 1962 – Cold War: Captured American U2 spy-plane pilot Gary Powers is exchanged for captured Soviet spy Rudolf Abel.
- 1964 – Melbourne–Voyager collision: The aircraft carrier HMAS Melbourne collides with and sinks the destroyer HMAS Voyager off the south coast of New South Wales, Australia, killing 82.
- 1967 – The 25th Amendment to the United States Constitution is ratified.
- 1972 – Ras Al Khaimah joins the United Arab Emirates, now making up seven emirates.
- 1984 – Kenyan soldiers kill an estimated 5,000 ethnic Somali Kenyans in the Wagalla massacre.
- 1989 – Ron Brown is elected chairman of the Democratic National Committee, becoming the first African American to lead a major American political party.
- 1996 – IBM supercomputer Deep Blue defeats Garry Kasparov in chess for the first time.
- 2003 – France and Belgium break the NATO procedure of silent approval concerning the timing of protective measures for Turkey in case of a possible war with Iraq.
- 2004 – Forty-three people are killed and three are injured when a Fokker 50 crashes near Sharjah International Airport.
- 2009 – The communications satellites Iridium 33 and Kosmos 2251 collide in orbit, destroying both.
- 2013 – Thirty-six people are killed and 39 others are injured in a stampede in Allahabad, India, during the Kumbh Mela festival.
- 2016 – South Korea decides to stop the operation of the Kaesong joint industrial complex with North Korea in response to the launch of Kwangmyŏngsŏng-4.
- 2018 – Nineteen people are killed and 66 injured when a Kowloon Motor Bus double decker on route 872 in Hong Kong overturns.
- 2021 – The traditional Carnival in Rio de Janeiro, Brazil is canceled for the first time because of the COVID-19 pandemic.
- 2021 – Texas' worst energy infrastructure failure, the 2021 Texas power crisis, starts.
- 2026 – Shootings at a residence and a school in Tumbler Ridge, British Columbia, Canada, leave nine people dead and 27 injured.

== Births ==
=== Pre-1600 ===
- 1486 – George of the Palatinate, German bishop (died 1529)
- 1499 – Thomas Platter, Swiss author and scholar (died 1582)
- 1514 – Domenico Bollani, Bishop of Brescia (died 1579)

=== 1601–1900 ===
- 1606 – Christine of France, Duchess of Savoy (died 1663)
- 1609 – John Suckling, English poet and playwright (died 1642)
- 1627 – Cornelis de Bie, Flemish poet and jurist (died 1715)
- 1685 – Aaron Hill, English poet and playwright (died 1750)
- 1696 – Johann Melchior Molter, German violinist and composer (died 1765)
- 1766 – Benjamin Smith Barton, American botanist and physician (died 1815)
- 1775 – Charles Lamb, English poet and essayist (died 1834)
- 1785 – Claude-Louis Navier, French physicist and engineer (died 1836)
- 1795 – Ary Scheffer, Dutch-French painter and academic (died 1858)
- 1797 – George Chichester, 3rd Marquess of Donegall (died 1883)
- 1821 – Roberto Bompiani, Italian painter and sculptor (died 1908)
- 1824 – Samuel Plimsoll, English merchant and politician (died 1898)
- 1829 – Julius von Szymanowski, Russian surgeon of Polish-German origin (died 1868)
- 1842 – Agnes Mary Clerke, Irish astronomer and author (died 1907)
- 1843 – Adelina Patti, Italian-French opera singer (died 1919)
- 1846 – Lord Charles Beresford, Irish admiral and politician (died 1919)
- 1846 – Ira Remsen, American chemist and academic (died 1927)
- 1847 – Nabinchandra Sen, Bangladeshi poet and author (died 1909)
- 1856 – Fredericus van Rossum du Chattel, Dutch painter (died 1917)
- 1859 – Alexandre Millerand, French lawyer and politician, 12th President of France (died 1943)
- 1867 – Robert Garran, Australian lawyer and public servant (died 1957)
- 1868 – Prince Waldemar of Prussia (died 1879)
- 1868 – William Allen White, American journalist and author (died 1944)
- 1869 – Royal Cortissoz, American art critic (died 1948)
- 1879 – Ernst Põdder, Estonian general (died 1932)
- 1881 – Pauline Brunius, Swedish actress and director (died 1954)
- 1883 – Edith Clarke, American electrical engineer (died 1959)
- 1883 – H. V. Hordern, Australian cricketer (died 1938)
- 1888 – Giuseppe Ungaretti, Egyptian-Italian soldier, journalist, and poet (died 1970)
- 1890 – Fanny Kaplan, Ukrainian-Russian activist (died 1918)
- 1890 – Boris Pasternak, Russian poet, novelist, and literary translator Nobel Prize laureate (died 1960)
- 1892 – Alan Hale Sr., American actor and director (died 1950)
- 1893 – Jimmy Durante, American actor, singer, and pianist (died 1980)
- 1893 – Bill Tilden, American tennis player and coach (died 1953)
- 1894 – Harold Macmillan, English captain and politician, Prime Minister of the United Kingdom (died 1986)
- 1897 – Judith Anderson, Australian actress (died 1992)
- 1897 – John Franklin Enders, American virologist and academic, Nobel Prize laureate (died 1985)
- 1898 – Bertolt Brecht, German director, playwright, and poet (died 1956)
- 1898 – Joseph Kessel, French journalist and author (died 1979)
- 1899 – Cevdet Sunay, Turkish general and politician, 5th President of Turkey (died 1982)

=== 1901–present ===
- 1901 – Stella Adler, American actress and educator (died 1992)
- 1902 – Walter Houser Brattain, Chinese-American physicist and academic, Nobel Prize laureate (died 1987)
- 1903 – Waldemar Hoven, German physician (died 1948)
- 1903 – Matthias Sindelar, Austrian footballer and manager (died 1939)
- 1904 – John Farrow, Australian-American director, producer, and screenwriter (died 1963)
- 1905 – Walter A. Brown, American businessman, founded the Boston Celtics (died 1964)
- 1905 – Chick Webb, American drummer and bandleader (died 1939)
- 1906 – Lon Chaney Jr., American actor (died 1973)
- 1907 – Anthony Cottrell, New Zealand rugby player (died 1988)
- 1908 – Jean Coulthard, Canadian composer and educator (died 2000)
- 1909 – Min Thu Wun, Burmese poet, scholar, and politician (died 2004)
- 1910 – Dominique Pire, Belgian friar, Nobel Prize laureate (died 1969)
- 1914 – Larry Adler, American harmonica player, composer, and actor (died 2001)
- 1915 – Vladimir Zeldin, Russian actor (died 2016)
- 1919 – Ioannis Charalambopoulos, Greek colonel and politician, Deputy Prime Minister of Greece (died 2014)
- 1920 – José Manuel Castañón, Spanish lawyer and author (died 2001)
- 1920 – Alex Comfort, English physician and author (died 2000)
- 1920 – Neva Patterson, American actress (died 2010)
- 1922 – Árpád Göncz, Hungarian author, playwright, and politician, 1st President of Hungary (died 2015)
- 1922 – José Gabriel da Costa, Brazilian spiritual leader, founder of the União do Vegetal (died 1971)
- 1923 – Allie Sherman, American football player and coach (died 2015)
- 1924 – Max Ferguson, Canadian radio host and actor (died 2013)
- 1924 – Bud Poile, Canadian ice hockey player and coach (died 2005)
- 1925 – Pierre Mondy, French actor and director (died 2012)
- 1926 – Sidney Bryan Berry, American general (died 2013)
- 1926 – Danny Blanchflower, Northern Irish soldier, footballer and manager (died 1993)
- 1927 – Leontyne Price, American operatic soprano
- 1929 – Jerry Goldsmith, American composer and conductor (died 2004)
- 1929 – Jim Whittaker, American mountaineer
- 1929 – Lou Whittaker, American mountaineer (died 2024)
- 1930 – E. L. Konigsburg, American author and illustrator (died 2013)
- 1930 – Robert Wagner, American actor and producer
- 1931 – James West, American inventor and acoustician
- 1932 – Barrie Ingham, English-American actor (died 2015)
- 1933 – Faramarz Payvar, Iranian musician and composer (died 2009)
- 1933 – Richard Schickel, American journalist, author, and critic (died 2017)
- 1934 – Fleur Adcock, New Zealand poet (died 2024)
- 1935 – Theodore Antoniou, Greek composer and conductor (died 2018)
- 1935 – Barbara Maier Gustern, American vocal coach and singer (died 2022)
- 1937 – Anne Anderson, Scottish physiologist and academic (died 1983)
- 1937 – Roberta Flack, American singer-songwriter and pianist (died 2025)
- 1939 – Adrienne Clarkson, Hong Kong-Canadian journalist and politician, 26th Governor General of Canada
- 1939 – Deolinda Rodríguez de Almeida, Angolan nationalist (died 1967)
- 1940 – Mary Rand, English sprinter and long jumper (died 2026)
- 1940 – Kenny Rankin, American singer-songwriter (died 2009)
- 1941 – Michael Apted, English director and producer (died 2021)
- 1941 – Dick Carlson, American journalist and diplomat (died 2025)
- 1944 – Peter Allen, Australian singer-songwriter, pianist, and actor (died 1992)
- 1944 – Frank Keating, American lawyer and politician, 25th Governor of Oklahoma
- 1944 – Frances Moore Lappé, American author and activist
- 1944 – Rufus Reid, American bassist and composer
- 1945 – Delma S. Arrigoitia, Puerto Rican historian, author, educator and lawyer (died 2023)
- 1945 – Glynn Saulters, American basketball player
- 1946 – Dick Anderson, American football player
- 1947 – Louise Arbour, Canadian lawyer and jurist
- 1947 – Butch Morris, American cornet player, composer, and conductor (died 2013)
- 1947 – Nicholas Owen, English journalist
- 1949 – Nigel Olsson, English rock drummer and singer-songwriter
- 1950 – Luis Donaldo Colosio Murrieta, Mexican economist and politician (died 1994)
- 1950 – Mark Spitz, American swimmer
- 1951 – Bob Iger, American media executive
- 1952 – Lee Hsien Loong, Singaporean general and politician, 3rd Prime Minister of Singapore
- 1955 – Jim Cramer, American television personality, pundit, and author
- 1955 – Tom LaGarde, American basketball player
- 1955 – Greg Norman, Australian golfer and sportscaster
- 1956 – Kathleen Beller, American actress
- 1956 – James Martin Graham, American Roman Catholic priest (died 1997)
- 1956 – Enele Sopoaga, Tuvaluan politician, 12th Prime Minister of Tuvalu
- 1957 – Katherine Freese, American astrophysicist and academic
- 1958 – Ricardo Gareca, Argentine footballer and manager
- 1959 – John Calipari, American basketball player and coach
- 1960 – Jim Kent, American biologist, computer programmer, academic
- 1961 – Alexander Payne, American director, producer, and screenwriter
- 1961 – George Stephanopoulos, American television journalist
- 1962 – Cliff Burton, American musician and songwriter (died 1986)
- 1962 – Bobby Czyz, American boxer and commentator
- 1962 – Randy Velischek, Canadian ice hockey player and coach
- 1963 – Lenny Dykstra, American baseball player
- 1964 – Glenn Beck, American journalist, producer, and author
- 1966 – Natalie Bennett, Australian-English journalist and politician
- 1966 – Daryl Johnston, American football player and sportscaster
- 1966 – David Cordani, American businessman
- 1967 – Laura Dern, American actress, director, and producer
- 1967 – Jacky Durand, French cyclist and sportscaster
- 1967 – Vince Gilligan, American director, producer, and screenwriter
- 1968 – Peter Popovic, Swedish ice hockey player and coach
- 1968 – Garrett Reisman, American engineer and astronaut
- 1969 – Joe Mangrum, American painter and sculptor
- 1969 – James Small, South African rugby player (died 2019)
- 1970 – Melissa Doyle, Australian journalist and author
- 1970 – Noureddine Naybet, Moroccan footballer and manager
- 1970 – Åsne Seierstad, Norwegian journalist and author
- 1971 – Lorena Rojas, Mexican actress and singer (died 2015)
- 1972 – Michael Kasprowicz, Australian cricketer
- 1973 – Martha Lane Fox, Baroness Lane-Fox of Soho, English businesswoman and politician
- 1974 – Elizabeth Banks, American actress
- 1974 – Ty Law, American football player
- 1974 – Ivri Lider, Israeli singer
- 1974 – Henry Paul, New Zealand rugby player and coach
- 1975 – Hiroki Kuroda, Japanese baseball player
- 1975 – Tina Thompson, American basketball player and coach
- 1976 – Lance Berkman, American baseball player and coach
- 1976 – Keeley Hawes, English actress
- 1977 – Salif Diao, Senegalese footballer
- 1978 – Don Omar, Puerto Rican rapper, singer, producer, and actor
- 1979 – Joey Hand, American race car driver
- 1980 – César Izturis, Venezuelan baseball player
- 1980 – Enzo Maresca, Italian footballer and manager
- 1980 – Mike Ribeiro, Canadian ice hockey player
- 1980 – Bruno Šundov, Croatian basketball player
- 1981 – Uzo Aduba, American actress
- 1981 – Stephanie Beatriz, American actress
- 1981 – Max Brown, English actor
- 1981 – Andrew Johnson, English footballer
- 1981 – Barry Sloane, English actor
- 1981 – Holly Willoughby, English model and television host
- 1982 – Hamad Al-Tayyar, Kuwaiti footballer
- 1982 – Justin Gatlin, American sprinter
- 1982 – Tarmo Neemelo, Estonian footballer
- 1982 – Iafeta Paleaaesina, New Zealand rugby league player
- 1983 – Vic Fuentes, American singer-songwriter and guitarist
- 1984 – Greg Bird, Australian rugby league player
- 1984 – Alex Gordon, American baseball player
- 1984 – Kim Hyo-jin, South Korean actress
- 1984 – Zaza Pachulia, Georgian basketball player
- 1985 – Selçuk İnan, Turkish footballer
- 1985 – Paul Millsap, American basketball player
- 1986 – Jeff Adrien, American basketball player
- 1986 – Josh Akognon, American basketball player
- 1986 – Radamel Falcao, Colombian footballer
- 1986 – Nahuel Guzmán, Argentine footballer
- 1986 – Roberto Jiménez, Spanish footballer
- 1986 – Viktor Troicki, Serbian tennis player
- 1987 – Justin Braun, American ice hockey player
- 1987 – Jakub Kindl, Czech ice hockey player
- 1987 – Facundo Roncaglia, Argentine footballer
- 1988 – Francesco Acerbi, Italian footballer
- 1989 – Travis d'Arnaud, American baseball player
- 1989 – Liam Hendriks, Australian baseball player
- 1989 – Birgit Skarstein, Norwegian Paralympic athlete and social entrepreneur
- 1990 – Yuri Berchiche, Spanish footballer
- 1990 – Trevante Rhodes, American actor
- 1990 – Choi Soo-young, South Korean singer-songwriter, actress, and dancer
- 1991 – C. J. Anderson, American football player
- 1991 – Rebecca Dempster, Scottish footballer
- 1991 – Emma Roberts, American actress
- 1992 – Haruka Nakagawa, Japanese singer and actress
- 1992 – Reinhold Yabo, German footballer
- 1993 – Yasser Ibrahim, Egyptian footballer
- 1993 – Max Kepler, German-American baseball player
- 1993 – Luis Madrigal, Mexican footballer
- 1993 – Filip Twardzik, Czech footballer
- 1994 – Son Na-eun, South Korean singer and actress
- 1994 – Kang Seul-gi, South Korean singer
- 1994 – Makenzie Vega, American actress
- 1994 – Miguel Almirón, Paraguayan footballer
- 1995 – Sterling Brown, American basketball player
- 1995 – Bobby Portis, American basketball player
- 1995 – Carolane Soucisse, Canadian ice dancer
- 1995 – Lexi Thompson, American golfer
- 1995 – Naby Keïta, Guinean footballer
- 1996 – Alexandar Georgiev, Bulgarian-Russian ice hockey player
- 1996 – Emanuel Mammana, Argentine footballer
- 1997 – Josh Jackson, American basketball player
- 1997 – Lilly King, American swimmer
- 1997 – Chloë Grace Moretz, American actress
- 1997 – Nadia Podoroska, Argentine tennis player
- 1997 – Josh Rosen, American football player
- 1997 – Adam Armstrong, English footballer
- 1999 – Tiffany Espensen, American actress
- 2000 – María Carlé, Argentine tennis player
- 2000 – Yara Shahidi, American actress and model
- 2001 – Sergio Camello, Spanish footballer
- 2006 – Megan Skiendiel, American singer, dancer and actress
- 2009 – Antonio Arena, Italian footballer

== Deaths ==
=== Pre-1600 ===
- 547 – Scholastica, Christian nun
- 1127 – William IX, Duke of Aquitaine (born 1071)
- 1163 – Baldwin III of Jerusalem (born 1130)
- 1242 – Emperor Shijō of Japan (born 1231)
- 1280 – Margaret II, Countess of Flanders (born 1202)
- 1306 – John "the Red" Comyn, Scottish nobleman
- 1307 – Temür Khan, Emperor Chengzong of Yuan (born 1265)
- 1346 – Blessed Clare of Rimini (born 1282)
- 1471 – Frederick II, Margrave of Brandenburg (born 1413)
- 1524 – Catherine of Saxony, Archduchess of Austria (born 1468)
- 1526 – John V, Count of Oldenburg, German noble (born 1460)
- 1567 – Henry Stuart, Lord Darnley, consort of Mary, Queen of Scots (born 1545)
- 1576 – Wilhelm Xylander, German scholar, translator, and academic (born 1532)

=== 1601–1900 ===
- 1660 – Judith Leyster, Dutch painter (born 1609)
- 1686 – William Dugdale, English genealogist and historian (born 1605)
- 1752 – Henriette of France, French Princess (born1727)
- 1755 – Montesquieu, French lawyer and philosopher (born 1689)
- 1782 – Friedrich Christoph Oetinger, German theologian and author (born 1702)
- 1829 – Pope Leo XII (born 1760)
- 1831 – Peter Heywood, British naval officer (born 1772)
- 1837 – Alexander Pushkin, Russian poet and author (born 1799)
- 1846 – Maria Aletta Hulshoff, Dutch feminist and pamphleteer (born 1781)
- 1854 – José Joaquín de Herrera, Mexican politician and general (born 1792)
- 1857 – David Thompson, English-Canadian surveyor and explorer (born 1770)
- 1865 – Heinrich Lenz, Estonian-Italian physicist and academic (born 1804)
- 1879 – Honoré Daumier, French illustrator and painter (born 1808)
- 1887 – Ellen Wood, English author (born 1814)
- 1891 – Sofia Kovalevskaya, Russian-Swedish mathematician and physicist (born 1850)

=== 1901–present ===
- 1904 – John A. Roche, American lawyer and politician, 30th Mayor of Chicago (born 1844)
- 1906 – Ezra Butler Eddy, American-Canadian businessman and politician (born 1827)
- 1912 – Joseph Lister, 1st Baron Lister, English surgeon and academic (born 1827)
- 1913 – Konstantinos Tsiklitiras, Greek long jumper (born 1888)
- 1917 – John William Waterhouse, English painter (born 1849)
- 1918 – Abdul Hamid II, Ottoman sultan (born 1842)
- 1918 – Ernesto Teodoro Moneta, Italian soldier and journalist, Nobel Prize laureate (born 1833)
- 1920 – Henry Strangways, English-Australian politician, 12th Premier of South Australia (born 1832)
- 1923 – Wilhelm Röntgen, German physicist and academic, Nobel Prize laureate (born 1845)
- 1928 – José Sánchez del Río, Mexican martyr and saint (born 1913)
- 1932 – Edgar Wallace, English author and screenwriter (born 1875)
- 1939 – Pope Pius XI (born 1857)
- 1944 – E. M. Antoniadi, Greek-French astronomer and chess player (born 1870)
- 1945 – Anacleto Díaz, Filipino lawyer and jurist (born 1878)
- 1950 – Marcel Mauss, French sociologist and anthropologist (born 1872)
- 1956 – Leonora Speyer, American poet and violinist (born 1872)
- 1956 – Emmanouil Tsouderos, Greek banker and politician, 132nd Prime Minister of Greece (born 1882)
- 1957 – Laura Ingalls Wilder, American author (born 1867)
- 1960 – Aloysius Stepinac, Croatian cardinal (born 1898)
- 1966 – Billy Rose, American composer and songwriter (born 1899)
- 1967 – Dionysios Kokkinos, Greek historian and author (born 1884)
- 1975 – Nikos Kavvadias, Greek sailor and poet (born 1910)
- 1979 – Edvard Kardelj, Slovene general and politician, 2nd Foreign Minister of Yugoslavia (born 1910)
- 1992 – Alex Haley, American soldier, journalist, and author (born 1921)
- 1993 – Fred Hollows, New Zealand-Australian ophthalmologist and academic (born 1929)
- 1995 – Paul Monette, American author, poet, and activist (born 1945)
- 1997 – Brian Connolly, Scottish musician (born 1945)
- 2000 – Jim Varney, American actor, comedian and writer (born 1949)
- 2001 – Abraham Beame, American academic and politician, 104th Mayor of New York City (born 1906)
- 2001 – Buddy Tate, American saxophonist and clarinet player (born 1913)
- 2002 – Dave Van Ronk, American singer-songwriter and guitarist (born 1936)
- 2003 – Edgar de Evia, Mexican-American photographer (born 1910)
- 2003 – Albert J. Ruffo, American lawyer and politician, Mayor of San Jose (born 1908)
- 2003 – Ron Ziegler, American politician, 14th White House Press Secretary (born 1939)
- 2005 – Arthur Miller, American actor, playwright, and author (born 1915)
- 2006 – James Yancey, American record producer and rapper (born 1974)
- 2008 – Roy Scheider, American actor and boxer (born 1932)
- 2010 – Fred Schaus, American basketball player and coach (born 1925)
- 2010 – Charles Wilson, American lieutenant and politician (born 1933)
- 2011 – Trevor Bailey, English cricketer and journalist (born 1923)
- 2012 – Lloyd Morrison, New Zealand banker and businessman, founded H. R. L. Morrison & Co (born 1957)
- 2012 – Jeffrey Zaslow, American journalist and author (born 1958)
- 2013 – W. Watts Biggers, American author, screenwriter, and animator (born 1927)
- 2013 – David Hartman, American-Israeli rabbi and philosopher, founded the Shalom Hartman Institute (born 1931)
- 2014 – Stuart Hall, Jamaican-English sociologist and theorist (born 1932)
- 2014 – Shirley Temple, American actress and diplomat (born 1928)
- 2015 – Naseer Aruri, Palestinian scholar and activist (born 1934)
- 2015 – Karl Josef Becker, German cardinal and theologian (born 1928)
- 2015 – Deng Liqun, Chinese theorist and politician (born 1915)
- 2016 – Fatima Surayya Bajia, Indian-Pakistani author and playwright (born 1930)
- 2017 – Mike Ilitch, American businessman (born 1929)
- 2019 – Carmen Argenziano, American actor (born 1943)
- 2019 – Jan-Michael Vincent, American actor (born 1944)
- 2021 – Larry Flynt, American publisher (born 1942)
- 2022 – Olsen Filipaina, New Zealand rugby league player (born 1957)
- 2023 – AKA, South African rapper (born 1988)
- 2025 – Peter Tuiasosopo, American football player and actor (born 1963)
- 2026 – Jose de Venecia Jr., Filipino politician and journalist, 17th and 21st Speaker of the Philippine House of Representatives (born 1936)

== Holidays and observances ==
- Christian feast day:
  - Austrebertha
  - Charalambos
  - Blessed Eusebia Palomino Yenes
  - José Sánchez del Río
  - Scholastica
  - February 10 (Eastern Orthodox liturgics)
- Feast of St. Paul's Shipwreck (Malta)
- Fenkil Day(commemoration of the Second Battle of Massawa) (Eritrea)
- Kurdish Authors Union Day (Iraqi Kurdistan)
- National Memorial Day of the Exiles and Foibe (Italy)
- Arabian Leopard Day
