= February 12 (Eastern Orthodox liturgics) =

Day in the Eastern Orthodox liturgical calendar

Eastern Orthodox liturgical calendar
February 11	February 12	February 13
February 12 O.S. ≍ February 25 N.S. February 12 N.S ≍ January 30 O.S.

An Eastern Orthodox cross

February 12 in Eastern Orthodox liturgical calendars is a feast day and a day of commemoration of saints and martyrs. Although some Orthodox churches use the Revised Julian Calendar and others use the traditional Julian calendar, the fixed commemorations for their respective February 12 are broadly the same, no matter which calendar is used. (Note: Despite the dates being the same, the days to which they refer typically differ by 13 days. The notation Old Style or O.S. is sometimes used to indicate a date in the traditional Julian Calendar (the "Old Calendar"). The notation New Style or N.S, indicates a date in the Revised Julian calendar (the "New Calendar").)

== Saints ==
- Holy martyrs Prima, Ampelius, Dativus, Plotinus, Saturninus, Fabius, Felix and their companions, in Carthage, by the sword (304) (see also: February 11 - West (Note: "In Africa, during the persecution of Diocletian, the birthday of the holy martyrs Saturninus, a priest, Dativus, Felix, Ampelius, and their companions. They had, as was their custom, assembled for Mass, when they were seized by the soldiers and put to death, under the proconsul Anolinus."))
- Saint Meletius of Antioch, Archbishop of Antioch (381) (Note: "At Antioch, St. Meletius, a bishop, who often suffered exile for the Catholic faith, and finally died at Constantinople and went to his reward. His virtues have been highly extolled by St. John Chrysostom and St. Gregory of Nyssa.") (Note: Name days celebrated today include: Meletios, Meletius (Μελέτιος).)
- Saint Saint Mary (Marinus) at Alexandria, nun, and her father Eugene, monk, of Alexandria (6th century)
- Saint Antony II of Constantinople, Patriarch (901)
- Saint Sisinnios, 'Bishop of God', in the region of the Metropolis of Ephesus (c. 919-944) (Note: There is no record of Saint Sisinnios in Greek Hagiography or in the official calendar of the Orthodox Church. In fact his memory is preserved in two codices of the 15th century, one of Venetian origin, and the other from the National Library of Florence. His tenure as Bishop is placed in the period of Emperor Romanos I Lekapenos (919-944), and lasted 34 years. His holy relics are kept in Venice.)

== Pre-Schism Western saints ==
- Martyrs Modestus and Julian, at Carthage (2nd century?) (Note: Modestus was martyred in Carthage in North Africa and venerated as the patron-saint of Cartagena in Spain.)
- Hieromartyr Urbanus, Pope of Rome (223-230) (see also: May 25)
- Saint Modestus, a deacon, born in Sardinia and martyred under Diocletian (c. 304) (Note: His relics were brought to Benevento in Italy in c 785.)
- Saint Eulalia of Barcelona (Aulaire, Aulazie, Olalla), born in Barcelona in Spain, she was a virgin-martyr under Diocletian (c. 304) (Note: "At Barcelona, in Spain, in the time of the emperor Diocletian, St. Eulalia, virgin, who, being racked, torn with iron hooks, cast into the fire, and crucified, received the glorious crown of martyrdom.") (see also: August 22 and December 10)
- Saint Damian, a martyr in Rome whose relics were found in the Catacombs of St Callistus and sent to Salamanca in Spain
- Saint Gaudentius of Verona, Bishop of Verona in Italy, Confessor (c. 465) (Note: His relics are enshrined in the ancient basilica of St Stephen in Verona.)
- Saint Æthelwold of Lindisfarne (740) (Note: "There is nothing of much importance to relate concerning this saint, who was minister to S. Cuthbert in Farne, afterwards abbot of Mailros, and finally bishop of Lindisfarne.")
- Saint Benedict Revelli, a monk at Santa Maria dei Fonti in Italy, then a hermit on the island of Gallinaria in the Gulf of Genoa, became Bishop of Albenga in 870 (c. 900)
- Saint Julian the Hospitaller (Note: Also called 'the Poor'. Tradition says that Julian killed his own parents in error. In repentance he and his wife went to Rome on pilgrimage and built a hospice by the side of a river where they tended the poor and the sick and rowed travellers across the river. For this reason he is venerated as the patron saint of boatmen, innkeepers and travellers.)

== Post-Schism Orthodox saints ==
- Saint Prochorus of Georgia, builder of Holy Cross Monastery near Jerusalem (1066)
- Venebrable hieromartyr John the Sinaite (1091)
- New Monk-martyrs Luke (Mukhaidze) (1277) and Nicholas (Dvali) (1314), of Jerusalem, and the holy fathers of the Georgian monasteries in Jerusalem
- Saint Alexius, Metropolitan and Wonderworker of all Russia (1378)
- Saint Bassian, founder and Abbot of Ryabovsky Forest Monastery in Uglich (1509)
- New Martyr Christos the Gardener, at Constantinople (1748)
- Saint Meletius, Archbishop of Kharkov (1840)
- Venerable Meletios of Ypseni (Meletios of Lardos), founder of the Monastery of Panagia Ypseni, Rhodes, in 1855 (19th century)

=== New martyrs and confessors ===
- New Hieromartyr Alexius (Buy), Bishop of Voronezh (1930) (Note: See: (in Russian) Алексий (Буй). Википедии. (Russian Wikipedia).) (see also: October 21)
- New Martyr Mitrophan, Archpriest (1931)

== Other commemorations ==
- Appearance of the Iveron Icon of the Most Holy Theotokos ("Panagia Portaitissa" or "Gate-Keeper"), Mt. Athos (9th century) (see also: March 31)
- Consecration of the Church of the Theotokos in Pousgin (1002)
- Repose of the cave-dweller Anastasia (Logacheva) of Ardatov (1875)

== Icon gallery ==
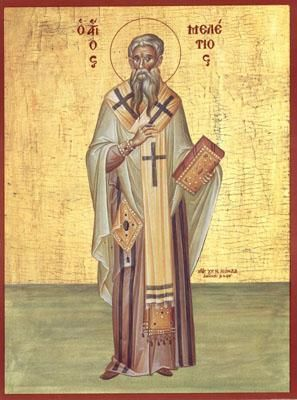
St Meletius of Antioch.

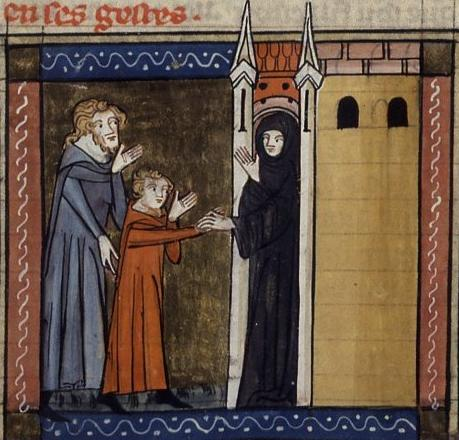
Saint St Mary (Marinus), presented to the monastery.

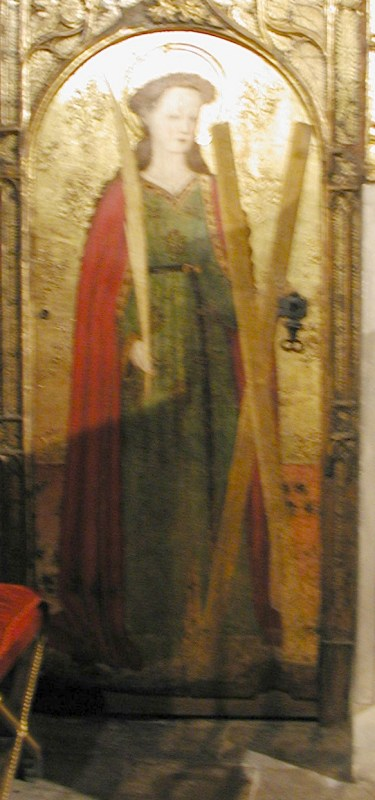
Virgin-martyr Eulalia of Barcelona, the most famous virgin-martyr in Spain, burnt at the stake.

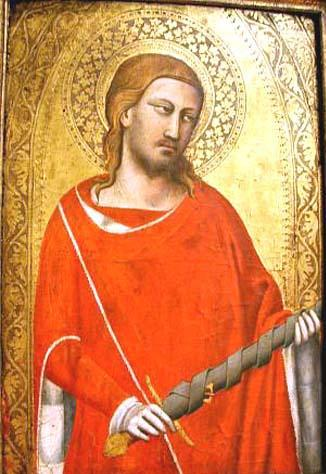
St Julian the Hospitaller.

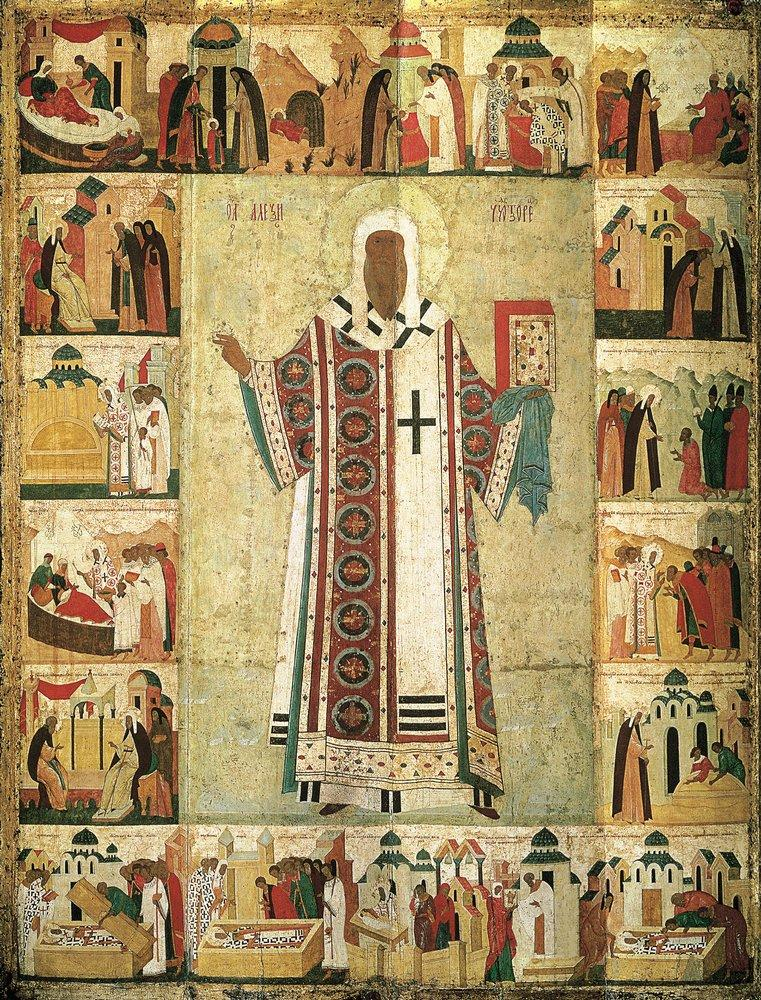
St Alexius, Metropolitan and Wonderworker of all Russia.

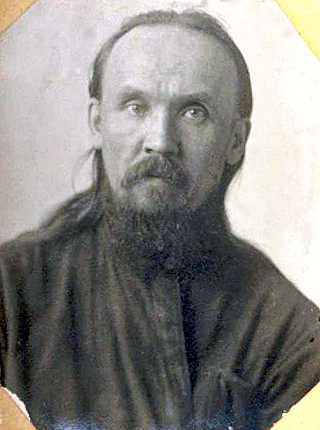
New Hieromartyr Alexius (Buy), Bishop of Voronezh.

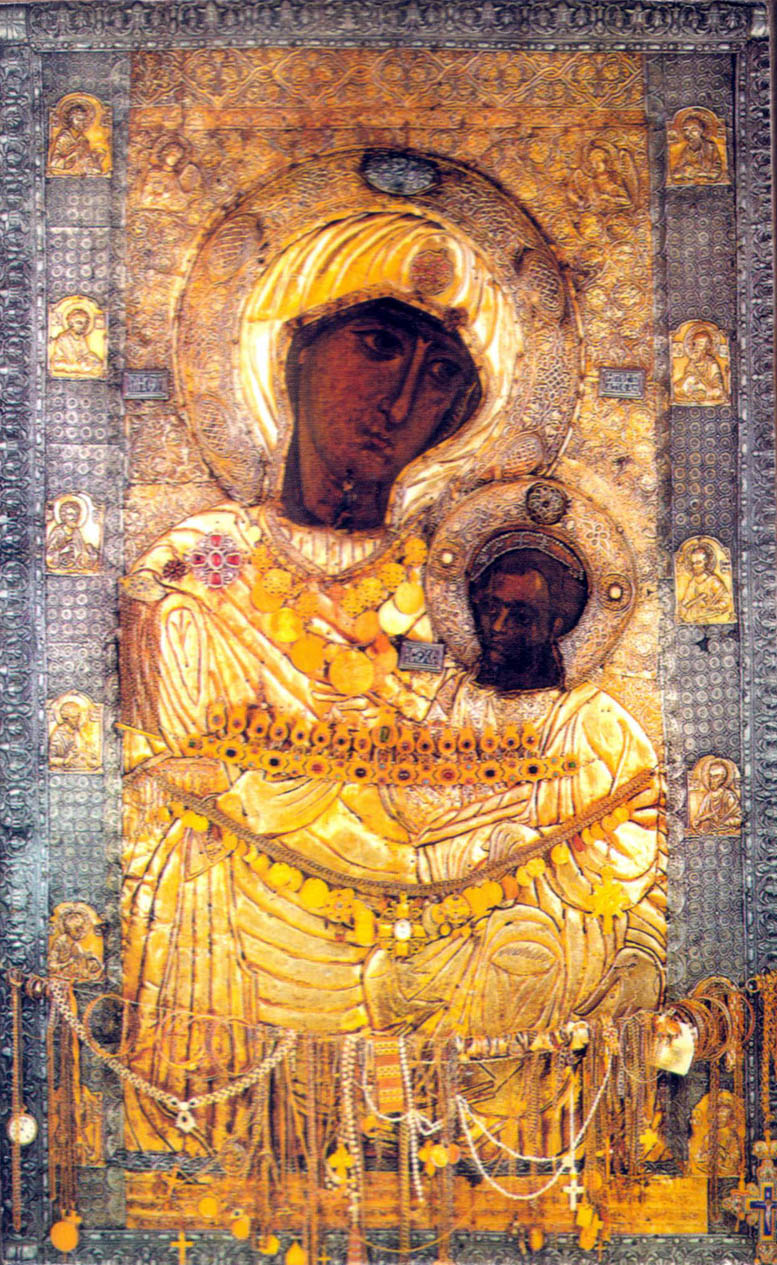
Iveron Icon of the Most Holy Theotokos.

== Sources ==
- February 12 / 25. Orthodox Calendar (Pravoslavie.ru).
- February 25 / 12. Holy Trinity Russian Orthodox Church (A parish of the Patriarchate of Moscow).
- February 12. OCA - The Lives of the Saints.
- The Autonomous Orthodox Metropolia of Western Europe and the Americas. St. Hilarion Calendar of Saints for the year of our Lord 2004. St. Hilarion Press (Austin, TX). p. 14.
- The Twelfth Day of the Month of February. Orthodoxy in China.
- February 12. Latin Saints of the Orthodox Patriarchate of Rome.
- The Roman Martyrology. Transl. by the Archbishop of Baltimore. Last Edition, According to the Copy Printed at Rome in 1914. Revised Edition, with the Imprimatur of His Eminence Cardinal Gibbons. Baltimore: John Murphy Company, 1916. pp. 45–46.
- Rev. Richard Stanton. A Menology of England and Wales, or, Brief Memorials of the Ancient British and English Saints Arranged According to the Calendar, Together with the Martyrs of the 16th and 17th Centuries. London: Burns & Oates, 1892. pp. 63–66.

Greek Sources

- Great Synaxaristes: (in Greek) 12 Φεβρουαριου. Μεγασ Συναξαριστησ.
- (in Greek) Συναξαριστής. 12 Φεβρουαρίου. Ecclesia.gr. (H Εκκλησια Τησ Ελλαδοσ).

Russian Sources

- (in Russian) 25 февраля (12 февраля). Православная Энциклопедия под редакцией Патриарха Московского и всея Руси Кирилла (электронная версия). (Orthodox Encyclopedia - Pravenc.ru).
