= Robert Bonnet =

Robert Bonnet may refer to:

- Rob Bonnet (born 1952), BBC television journalist
- Robert Bonnet (physician) (1851–1921), German anatomist

== See also ==
- Robert Bonnett (1916–1994), Australian politician
