= February 10 (Eastern Orthodox liturgics) =

Day in the Eastern Orthodox liturgical calendar

Eastern Orthodox liturgical calendar
February 9	February 10	February 11
February 10 O.S. ≍ February 23 N.S. February 10 N.S ≍ January 28 O.S.

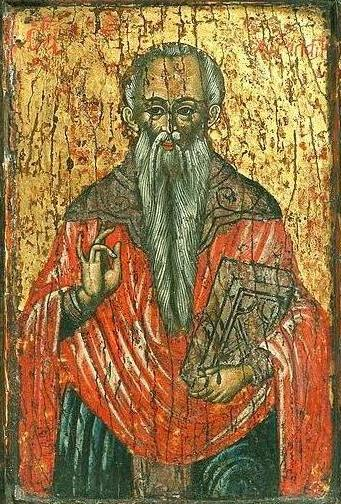
Hieromartyr Charalampus, Bishop of Magnesia in Asia Minor. (17th century).

February 10 in Eastern Orthodox liturgical calendars is a feast day and a day of commemoration of saints and martyrs. Although some Orthodox churches use the Revised Julian Calendar and others use the traditional Julian calendar, the fixed commemorations for their respective February 10 are broadly the same, no matter which calendar is used. (Note: Despite the dates being the same, the days to which they refer typically differ by 13 days. The notation Old Style or O.S. is sometimes used to indicate a date in the traditional Julian Calendar (the "Old Calendar"). The notation New Style or N.S, indicates a date in the Revised Julian calendar (the "New Calendar").)

== Saints ==
- Hieromartyr Charalampus, Bishop of Magnesia in Asia Minor, and with him martyrs Porphyrius and Baptus and three women (202) (Note: Name days celebrated today include: Haralambos, Bobby, Charles, Lambo (Χαράλαμπος); Harikleia, Haroula (Χαρίκλεια).)
- Martyrs Ennatha, Valentina, and Paula, Virgin-Martyrs of Palestine (308) (Note: Name days celebrated today include: Valentina, Valentin, Valio, Valia.)
- Saint Zeno the Righteous, the Postman of Emperor Valens, hermit at Antioch (4th century)
- Saint Anastasius II, Patriarch of Jerusalem (706)
- Saint Anna (Ingegerd Olofsdotter of Sweden), wife of Yaroslav I the Wise, of Novgorod and Kiev (1050) (see also: October 17)

== Pre-Schism Western saints ==
- Martyrs Zoticus, Irenaeus, Hyacinth, Amantius and Companions, at Rome (120) (Note: "At Rome, the holy martyrs Zoticus, Irenaeus, Hyacinthus, and Amantius.")
- Ten Soldier-Martyrs of Rome, buried on the Via Lavicana (c. 250 ?) (Note: "In the same place, on the Lavican road, ten holy soldiers, martyrs.")
- Saint Soteris, virgin-martyr in Rome under Diocletian (304) (Note: "Also at Rome, on the Appian way, St. Soteres, virgin and martyr, who was descended of a noble race, as St. Ambrose testifies, but for the love of Christ set at naught the consular and other dignities of her family. On her refusal to sacrifice to the gods, she was for a long time cruelly buffeted. After she had overcome various other torments, she was struck with the sword, and joyfully went to her heavenly spouse.")
- Saint Silvanus, Bishop of Terracina in Italy, Confessor (c. 443) (Note: "In Campania, St. Silvanus, bishop and confessor.")
- Saint Scholastica of Italy, sister of St. Benedict of Nursia (543) (Note: Sister of St Benedict. She became a nun and lived near Montecassino. St Gregory in his Dialogues (2,33), says that St Benedict saw her soul ascend to heaven in the semblance of a dove.) (Note: "On Mount Cassino, St. Scholastica, a virgin, whose soul her brother, St. Benedict, the abbot, saw leaving her body in the form of a dove, and ascending to heaven.")
- Saint Baldegundis, Abbess of Saint-Croix in Poitiers in France (c. 580)
- Saint Desideratus (Désiré), successor of St Avitus as Bishop of Clermont in Auvergne in France (6th century) (see also: February 11)
- Saint Prothadius (Protagius), successor of St Nicetius as Bishop of Besançon in France (624)
- Saint Austrebertha, Abbess of Abbeville and of Pavilly in northern France (704) (Note: Born near Thérouanne in Artois in the north of France, she was the daughter of St Framechildis and Count Badefrid. She became a nun with St Omer in Abbeville, where she became abbess. She was also blessed as Abbess of Pavilly.) (Note: "In the diocese of Roueu, St. Austreberta, a virgin renowned for miracles.")
- Saint Trumwine of Abercorn, Bishop of the Southern Picts in Scotland, who retired at Whitby Abbey (c. 704) (Note: Appointed in 681 by St Theodore and King Edfrid as Bishop of the Southern Picts in Scotland, he set up his diocese at the monastery of Abercorn on the Firth of Forth. In 685 King Egfrid was killed by the Picts and St Trumwin and all his monks had to flee. He retired to Whitby in England and lived an exemplary monastic life there.) (see also: December 2)
- Saint Erluph, Bishop of Werden in Germany, martyred by pagans (830)
- Saint Salvius, Abbot of Albelda in the north of Spain (962)
- Saint Merwinna, Abbess of Romsey Abbey (970)

== Post-Schism Orthodox saints ==
- Synaxis of the Novgorod Saints: (Note: This feast was introduced after the revelation of St. John, Archbishop Novgorod († 7 September 1186), to Saint Euthymius, Archbishop Novgorod († 11 March 1458), who told him to celebrate with an all-night vigil in the Cathedral of Hagia Sophia the venerable hierarchs of this local church, who honoured God with their lives and asceticism. This feast is also celebrated on October 4 and on the Third Sunday after Pentecost.) (Note: See: (in Russian) Собор Новгородских святых. Википедии. (Russian Wikipedia).)

- Ioakim Korsunianin (1030), Luke the Jew (1058), Germanus (1095), Arcadius (1163), Gregory (1193), Martyrius (1199), Anthony (1232), Basil (1352), Moses (1362), Symeon (1421), Gennadios (1504), Poimen (1571) and Athonios (1648).

- Saint Prochorus of the Kiev Caves Monastery (1107)
- Saint Basil Kalika, Archbishop of Novgorod the Great and Pskov (1352) (Note: He wrote the text "Paradise on Earth".)
- Saint John Chimchimeli of Bachkovo and Gremi (13th century) (Note: The Greek Synaxarion refers to him as 'John the Philosopher' and places him at the end of the 11th and start of the 12th centuries in Georgia.)
- Saint Longinus, founder of Koryazhemka Monastery in Vologda, monastic (1540)
- Saint Raphael, Archimandrite (1765), and St. Ioannicius, Hieromonk (1882), of Svatogorsk Monastery.

=== New martyrs and confessors ===
- New Hieromartyr Konstantin Veretsky, of Rostov-on-Don (1918) (Note: See: (in Russian) Верецкий, Константин Александрович. Википедии. (Russian Wikipedia).)
- New Hieromartyrs Peter Grudinsky (Note: See: (in Russian) Грудинский, Пётр Феофилович. Википедии. (Russian Wikipedia).) and Valerian Novitsky, (Note: See: (in Russian) Новицкий, Валериан Васильевич. Википедии. (Russian Wikipedia).) Priests (1930)

== Other commemorations ==
- Synaxis of the "Areovindus" ("Fiery Vision") Icon of the Most Holy Theotokos. (Note: This temple existed opposite the Royal/Palace Gate (Balat Kapı) in today's Hasköy quarter of Constantinople, and was built in the year 598 AD by the brother of Emperor Maurice (582-602), named Peter. Illustrious military personnel of Anatolia carried the name "Areovindus".)
- Commemoration of the deliverance of the island of Zakynthos from the plague by Saint Charalampus (1728) (Note: This occurred in 1728 when a plague struck the island of Zakynthos and the Christians decided to build a temple in honour of Saint Charalampus for his intercession and for their deliverance from this calamity.)

== Icon gallery ==
Hieromartyr Charalampus, Bishop of Magnesia in Asia Minor, and martyrs Porphyrius and Baptus and three women.
(Menologion of Basil II, 10th century).

Hieromartyr Charalampus, Bishop of Magnesia.
(Tarnovo Regional Museum, Bulgaria, 1844).

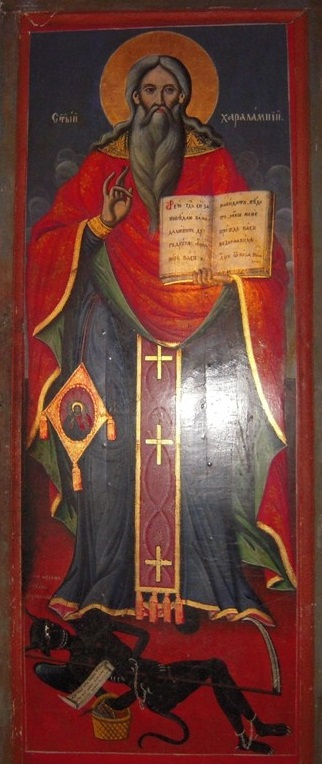
St. Charalampus, Bishop of Magnesia.
(Iconostasis of St Nicholas Church in Toplica).

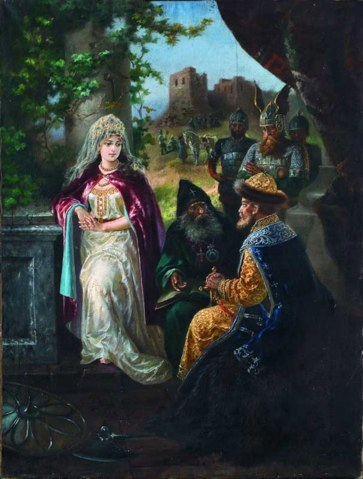
St. Anna (Ingegerd Olofsdotter of Sweden), wife of Yaroslav I the Wise, of Novgorod and Kiev.
(Aleksei Trankovsky, late 19th century).

Mosaic of St. Scholastica.
(Cappella Palatina, Palermo, Sicily).

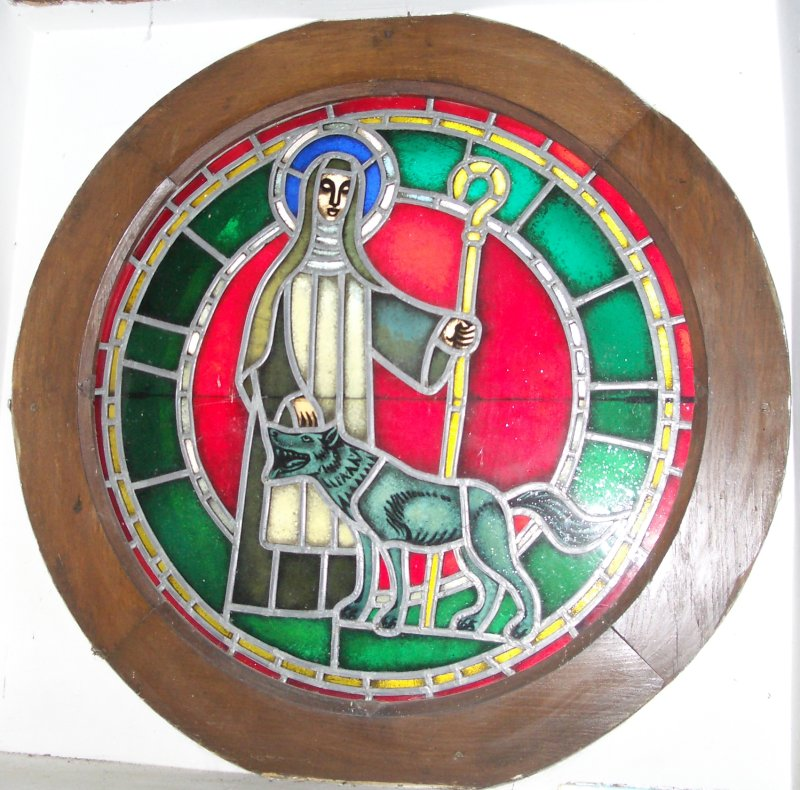
Saint Austrebertha.

Synaxis of the Novgorod Saints.
(c 1860).

New Hieromartyr Peter Grudinsky, priest.

== Sources ==
- February 10 / 23. Orthodox Calendar (Pravoslavie.ru).
- February 23 / 10. Holy Trinity Russian Orthodox Church (A parish of the Patriarchate of Moscow).
- February 10. OCA - The Lives of the Saints.
- The Autonomous Orthodox Metropolia of Western Europe and the Americas. St. Hilarion Calendar of Saints for the year of our Lord 2004. St. Hilarion Press (Austin, TX). p. 14.
- The Tenth Day of the Month of February. Orthodoxy in China.
- February 10. Latin Saints of the Orthodox Patriarchate of Rome.
- The Roman Martyrology. Transl. by the Archbishop of Baltimore. Last Edition, According to the Copy Printed at Rome in 1914. Revised Edition, with the Imprimatur of His Eminence Cardinal Gibbons. Baltimore: John Murphy Company, 1916. pp. 43–44.
- Rev. Richard Stanton. A Menology of England and Wales, or, Brief Memorials of the Ancient British and English Saints Arranged According to the Calendar, Together with the Martyrs of the 16th and 17th Centuries. London: Burns & Oates, 1892. pp. 61–62.

Greek Sources

- Great Synaxaristes: (in Greek) 10 Φεβουαριου. Μεγασ Συναξαριστησ.
- (in Greek) Συναξαριστής. 10 Φεβρουαρίου. Ecclesia.gr. (H Εκκλησια Τησ Ελλαδοσ).

Russian Sources

- (in Russian) 23 февраля (10 февраля). Православная Энциклопедия под редакцией Патриарха Московского и всея Руси Кирилла (электронная версия). (Orthodox Encyclopedia - Pravenc.ru).
