= Erich Kallius =

German anatomist (1867–1935)

- Born: Erich Wilhelm Heinrich Kallius; 3 August 1867; Berlin, Germany
- Died: 1 January 1935 (aged 67); Heidelberg, Baden-Württemberg, Germany
- Education: University of Berlin; University of Göttingen
- Occupation: Anatomist

Erich Wilhelm Heinrich Kallius (3 August 1867, in Berlin – 1 January 1935, in Heidelberg) was a German anatomist.

He received his education at the Universities of Berlin and Göttingen, earning his medical doctorate in 1892. As a student, he had as instructors, Heinrich Wilhelm Gottfried von Waldeyer-Hartz in Berlin and Friedrich Sigmund Merkel at Göttingen. In 1894 he was habilitated for anatomy in Göttingen, where during the following year he became an associate professor. From 1907 to 1917, he was a professor of anatomy at the University of Greifswald, followed by a professorship at the University of Breslau (1917-1921). In 1921 he was appointed director of the institute of anatomy at the University of Heidelberg.

His research was mainly in the fields of comparative anatomy and evolutionary development. His primary areas of work included studies on the development of the tongue and of the thyroid gland. He is credited with introducing a method of "fixing" Golgi stains so that contrast-stains could be employed with them and the specimens protected by cover-slips.

== Selected works ==
- Beiträge zur Entwicklung der Zunge, (ca. 1890 to 1906) - Contributions to the development of the tongue.
- Ein einfaches Verfahren, um Golgische Präparate für die Dauer zu fixieren, 1892 - A simple method to fix Golgi preparations for the sake of durability.
- Beiträge zur Entwickelungsgeschichte des Kehlkopfes, 1897 - Contributions to the developmental history of the larynx.
- Sinnesorgane. Abt. 1. Geruchsorgan (organon olfactus) und Geschmacksorgan, 1905 - Sensory organs: organs of smell and taste. Part of series: Handbuch der Anatomie des Menschen, 5. Bd., 1. Abt., 2. T.
- Anatomie und bildende Kunst Rede, 1924 - Anatomy and fine arts: speech.
