= Friedrich Sigmund Merkel =

German anatomist and histopathologist

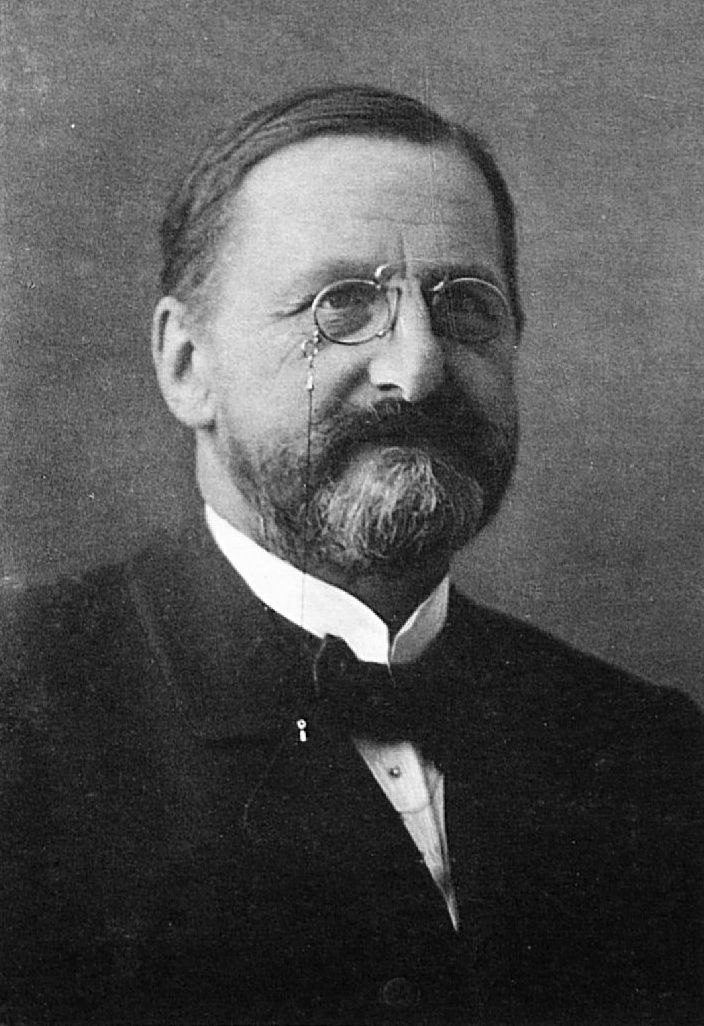
Friedrich Merkel

Friedrich Sigmund Merkel (5 April 1845 – 28 May 1919) was a leading German anatomist and histopathologist of the late 19th century. In 1875, he provided the first full description of Tastzellen (touch cells), which occur in the skin of all vertebrates. They were subsequently given the eponym "Merkel cells" in 1878 by Robert Bonnet (1851–1921).

Merkel was a native of Nürnberg. In 1869 he earned his medical doctorate from the University of Erlangen, becoming habilitated in the field of anatomy during the following year. He was a professor at the Universities of Rostock (from 1872), Königsberg (from 1883) and Göttingen (from 1885). At Göttingen, he worked under Jacob Henle and married Henle's daughter Anne. He published a multivolume textbook on human anatomy and originated the color scheme used by most anatomy texts today: red for arteries, blue for veins, and yellow for nerves. He introduced xylene as a clearing agent in histology, and it is still used today Two of his better known assistants were Dietrich Barfurth (1849-1927) and Hermann Kuhnt (1850-1925).

The term "Merkel's spur" is synonymous with the femoral calcar.

== Selected publications ==
- Makroskopische Anatomie des Auges und seiner Umgebungen; In Handbuch der Augenheilkunde; Leipzig, 1874; second edition with Erich Kallius (1867-1935) in 1901 - Macroscopic anatomy of the eye and its environment.
- Das Mikroskop und seine Anwendung, 1875 - The microscope and its application.
- Über die Endigungen der sensiblen Nerven in der Haut der Wirbeltiere, Rostock, 1880 - On sensory nerve terminations in the skin of vertebrates.
- Handbuch der topographischen Anatomie 1885 to 1907 - Manual of topographical anatomy.
- Ergebnisse der Anatomie und Entwickelungsgeschichte; from 1892, one annual volume, published with Robert Bonnet (1851-1921) - Anatomical results and developmental history.
- Menschliche Embryonen verschiedenen Alters auf Medianschnitten untersucht, 1894.
- Die Anatomie des Menschen. Mit Hinweisen auf die ärztliche Praxis, (11 volumes) 1913 to 1918 - Human anatomy, with reference to the practice of medicine.
