= February 11 (Eastern Orthodox liturgics) =

Day in the Eastern Orthodox liturgical calendar

Eastern Orthodox liturgical calendar
February 10	February 11	February 12
February 11 O.S. ≍ February 24 N.S. February 11 N.S ≍ January 29 O.S.

An Eastern Orthodox cross

February 11 in Eastern Orthodox liturgical calendars is a feast day and a day of commemoration of saints and martyrs. Although some Orthodox churches use the Revised Julian Calendar and others use the traditional Julian calendar, the fixed commemorations for their respective February 11 are broadly the same, no matter which calendar is used. (Note: Despite the dates being the same, the days to which they refer typically differ by 13 days. The notation Old Style or O.S. is sometimes used to indicate a date in the traditional Julian Calendar (the "Old Calendar"). The notation New Style or N.S, indicates a date in the Revised Julian calendar (the "New Calendar").)

== Saints ==
- Hieromartyr Blaise, Bishop of Sebaste (316) (Note: Name days celebrated today include: Blaise (Βλάσιος).)
- The Holy 7 women martyrs and 2 youth, companions of Hieromartyr Blaise of Sebaste (316). (Note: During the martyrdom of St. Blaise, seven women who had been following him and felt so much indignation at his harsh injustice and admiration for the Saint, also boldly proclaimed their faith in Christ to the governor Agricola. They were beheaded for their confession and received the crown of martyrdom. In addition, in prison together with Saint Blaise were two young people, whom the Saint catechized and baptized, who were also martyred after the Saint.)
- Hieromartyr Lucius of Adrianople (348) (Note: "At Adrianople, the holy martyrs Lucius, bishop, and his companions. Lucius suffered much from the Arians under Constantius, and terminated his martyrdom in prison. The others, who were among the principal citizens, refusing to communicate with the Arians, just then anathematized in the Council of Sardica, were condemned to capital punishment by Count Philagrius.")
- Saint Theodora, wife of Emperor Theophilus the Iconoclast (867)
- Saint Blaise the Hieromartyr of Acarnania (Vlasios of Sklavaina) (1006) (Note: Saint Blaise was probably born in the village Sklavaina, Acarnania, in late 10th century or early 11th century, where his tomb and holy relics were discovered in 1923. He became a monk at the Monastery of the Entrance of the Theotokos in Kiafa-Sklavaina, in the province of Vonitsa-Xiromero, where he became Abbot. He was martyred there in the year 1006 by Hagarene pirates, along with five of his fellow ascetics. The Saint himself revealed his martyrdom to many devout priests and Orthodox Christians in the region.)

== Pre-Schism Western saints ==
- Saint Calocerus, a disciple of St Apollinaris, whom he succeeded as Bishop of Ravenna, Confessor (c. 130) (see also: April 18; May 19)
- Martyrs of North-West Africa, the 'Guardians of the Holy Scriptures' (303) (Note: Martyrs known as the 'Guardians of the Holy Scriptures'.. They preferred martyrdom to giving up the sacred books to be burnt. They suffered under Diocletian.) (Note: "In Numidia, in the same persecution, the commemoration of many holy martyrs, who, refusing after their apprehension to deliver the holy Scriptures, conformably to the imperial edict, were given over to most painful torments and slain.")
- Martyrs Saturninus, Dativus, Felix, Ampelius, Victoria and Companions (304) (Note: A group of forty-six martyrs in Albitina in North Africa. They were arrested at the liturgy and sent to Carthage for examination. Saturninus was a priest, and with him suffered his four children, Saturninus and Felix, readers, Mary, a virgin, and Hilarion, a young child. Dativus and another Felix were senators. Other names from this group which have come down to us are: Thelica, Ampelius, Emeritus, Rogatian and Victoria, a holy virgin of undaunted courage. The child Hilarion, when threatened by the magistrates while his companions were being tortured, replied: 'Yes, torture me too; anyhow, I am a Christian'. They all died in prison.) (Note: "In Africa, during the persecution of Diocletian, the birthday of the holy martyrs Saturninus, a priest, Dativus, Felix, Ampelius, and their companions. They had, as was their custom, assembled for Mass, when they were seized by the soldiers and put to death, under the proconsul Anolinus.") (see also: February 12 - Greek)
- Saint Lazarus of Milan, Archbishop of Milan, he defended his flock from the Ostrogoths.
- Saints Priscus the Bishop, with Castrensis, Tammarus, Rosius, Heraclius, Secundinus, Adjutor, Mark, Augustus, Elpidius, Canion and Vindonius, priests (5th century) (Note: Priscus, a bishop in North Africa, and his priests were cast adrift in a boat by the Arian Vandals. They reached the south of Italy, where eventually Priscus became Bishop of Capua.)
- Saint Severinus, a Burgundian who became the Abbot of Agaunum in Switzerland (507) (Note: "At Chateau-Landon, St. Severin, abbot of the monastery of Agaunum, by whose prayers the Christian king Clovis was delivered from a long sickness.")
- Saint Desideratus (Désiré), successor of St Avitus as Bishop of Clermont in Auvergne in France (6th century) (see also: February 10)
- Saint Desiderius, Bishop of Vienne and martyr (608) (Note: He defended Orthodox values and was murdered for this at the place now called Saint-Didier-sur-Chalaronne.)
- Saint Cædmon of Whitby, monk, hymnographer (c. 680) (Note: A Northumbrian, who worked at the monastery of Whitby in England as a farm-labourer. He was the first Englishman to write Orthodox hymns.)
- Saint Gobnait, abbess of Ballyvourney, County Cork, Ireland (7th century) (Note: Abbess of a convent in Ballyvourney in Co. Cork in Ireland. A holy well named after her still exists there.)
- Saint Gregory II, Pope of Rome (731) (Note: Born in Rome, he was librarian and archivist of the Roman Church, when he was chosen Pope in 715. He is famous for encouraging the spreading of the Gospel among the Germanic peoples, to whom he sent St Boniface and St Corbinian. He restored several Italian monasteries, notably Montecassino. He also opposed Iconoclasm and checked the advancing Lombards.)
- Saint Benedict of Aniane, monastic reformer (821) (Note: A Visigoth, by name Witiza, he was born in Languedoc in France. In 773 he became a monk at Saint-Seine near Dijon and in 779 founded a monastery in Languedoc by a stream called Aniane. The Emperor asked him to oversee monasteries in Languedoc, Provence and Gascony and eventually all those in French and Germany.)

== Post-Schism Orthodox saints ==
- Saint Gabriel of Pskov (Prince Vsevolod of Pskov), Prince and wonderworker of Pskov (1138)
- Venerable Demetrius, monk and wonderworker of Priluki Monastery in Vologda (1392) (Note: See: (in Russian) Димитрий Прилуцкий. Википедии. (Russian Wikipedia).)
- New Martyr George of Kratovo, at Sofia, burned at the stake (1515) (Note: He came from the Serbian town of Kratov, where he was a master goldsmith. From his youth he distinguished himself by special meekness and humility. An idle word never left his mouth. He never praised himself and never envied anybody. The Moslems wanted to convert him to their faith and with this purpose in mind offered him various awards and high positions. George remained firm, and for this reason he was subjected to various harsh tortures and finally burned at the stake in the city of Sofia in 1515 at the age of 18.)
- Venerable Cassian the Barefoot (in the world 'Kosmas'), ascetic of the Joseph-Volokolamsk Monastery (1532) (Note: He was an ascetic at the Monastery of the Dormition of the Theotokos in Volokolamsk (Joseph-Volokolamsk Monastery), under its Abbot Joseph Volotsky (September 9), a prominent theologian of the Russian Orthodox Church who led the party defending monastic landownership. In 1530 Cassian became the Godfather of the future Tsar Ivan IV Vasilyevich (Ivan the Terrible).) (Note: (in Russian) Кассиан Босой (в миру Козьма) (1439-1532), церк.-полит.деятель,крёстный отец Ивана Грозного (1530).)

== Other commemorations ==
- Uncovering of the relics of Saint Zechariah, the father of St. John the Baptist (415) (Note: According to Patriarch of Jerusalem Dositheus, the relics of Saint Zechariah († September 5) were found in the year 415 AD in Eleftheroupolis in Palestine, during the reign of Emperor Theodosius II (408-450 AD), by someone called 'Kalimeros" (lit.: "good morning"). His sacred relics, along with the relics of Joseph, son of Jacob, were lodged at the Great Church of Christ. The Patriarch of Jerusalem Nektarios writes about the translation of the relics of the Prophet Zechariah to Venice, Italy.)
- Repose of Archbishop Simon (Vinogradov) of Shanghai and Peking (1933) (Note: See: (in Russian) Симон (Виноградов). Википедии. (Russian Wikipedia).)
- Glorification (2026) of the Venerable Tikhon (Golenkov) of Kapsala, Mount Athos (1968) (Note: He was glorified by the Ecumenical Patriarchate on February 11, 2026. The official communiqué of the Ecumenical Patriarchate was as follows: (in Greek)"Τό Ἱερόν Σῶμα ἀπεφάσισεν ὁμοφώνως τήν κατάταξιν εἰς τό ἁγιολόγιον τῆς Ἐκκλησίας τῶν ὁσιακῆς βιοτῆς Ἁγιορειτῶν Ἱερομονάχου Τύχωνος, τοῦ ἐν τῷ ἐν τῇ Σκήτῃ Καψάλας Ἱερῷ Σταυρονικητιανῷ Κελλίῳ τοῦ Τιμίου Σταυροῦ ἀσκήσαντος, καί μοναχοῦ Γεωργίου, τοὐπίκλην Χατζη-Γεώργη, τοῦ ἐκ Καππαδοκίας καταγομένου καί ἐν Κωνσταντινουπόλει κοιμηθέντος.") (see also: September 10)

== Icon gallery ==
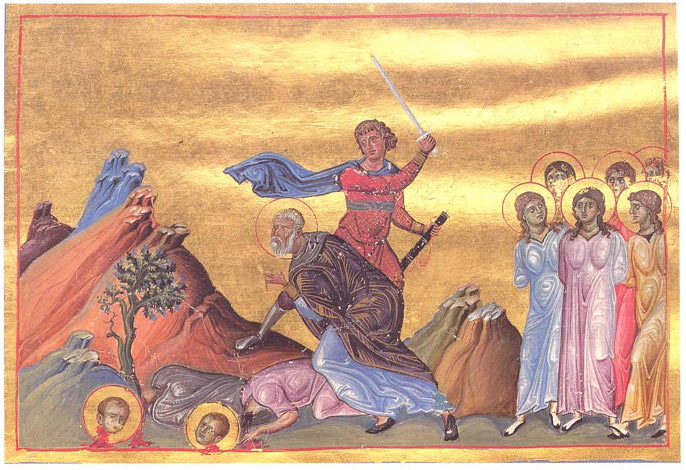
St. Blaise of Sebaste.
(Menologion of Basil II, 10th century).

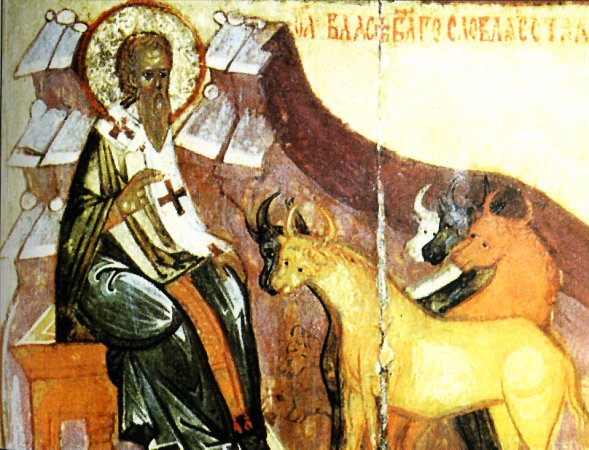
St. Blaise of Sebaste.

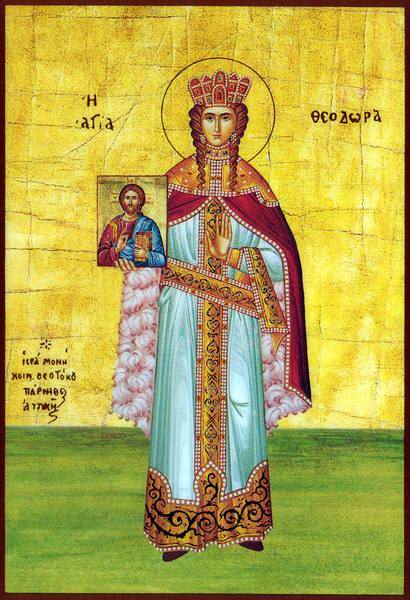
St. Theodora.

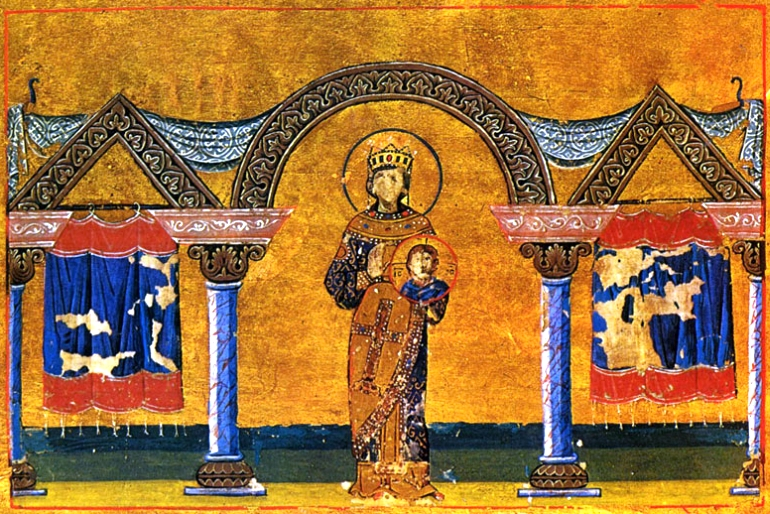
St. Theodora.
(Menologion of Basil II, 10th century).

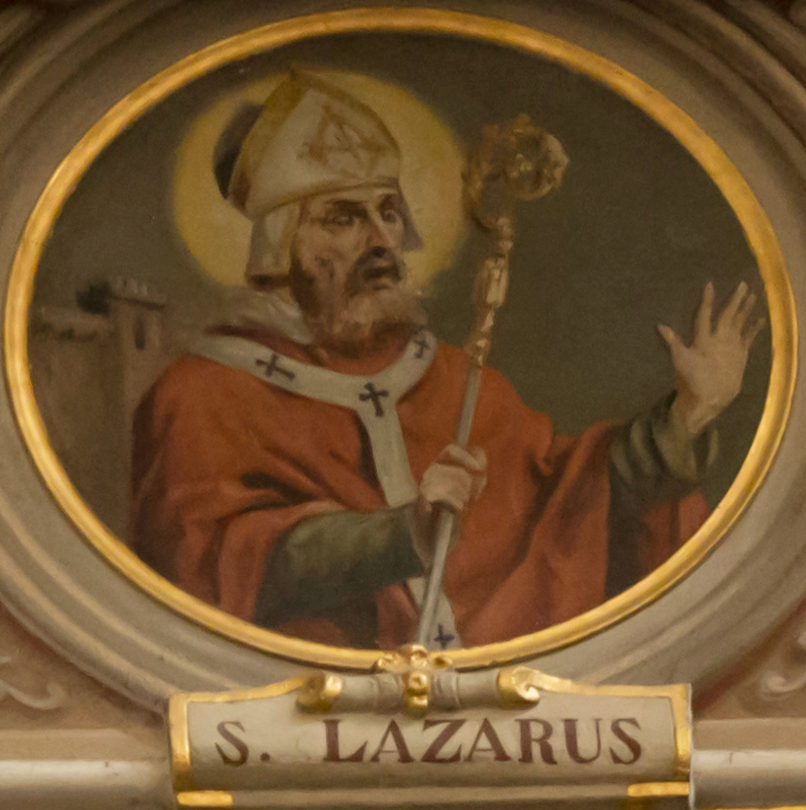
St. Lazarus of Milan, Archbishop of Milan.

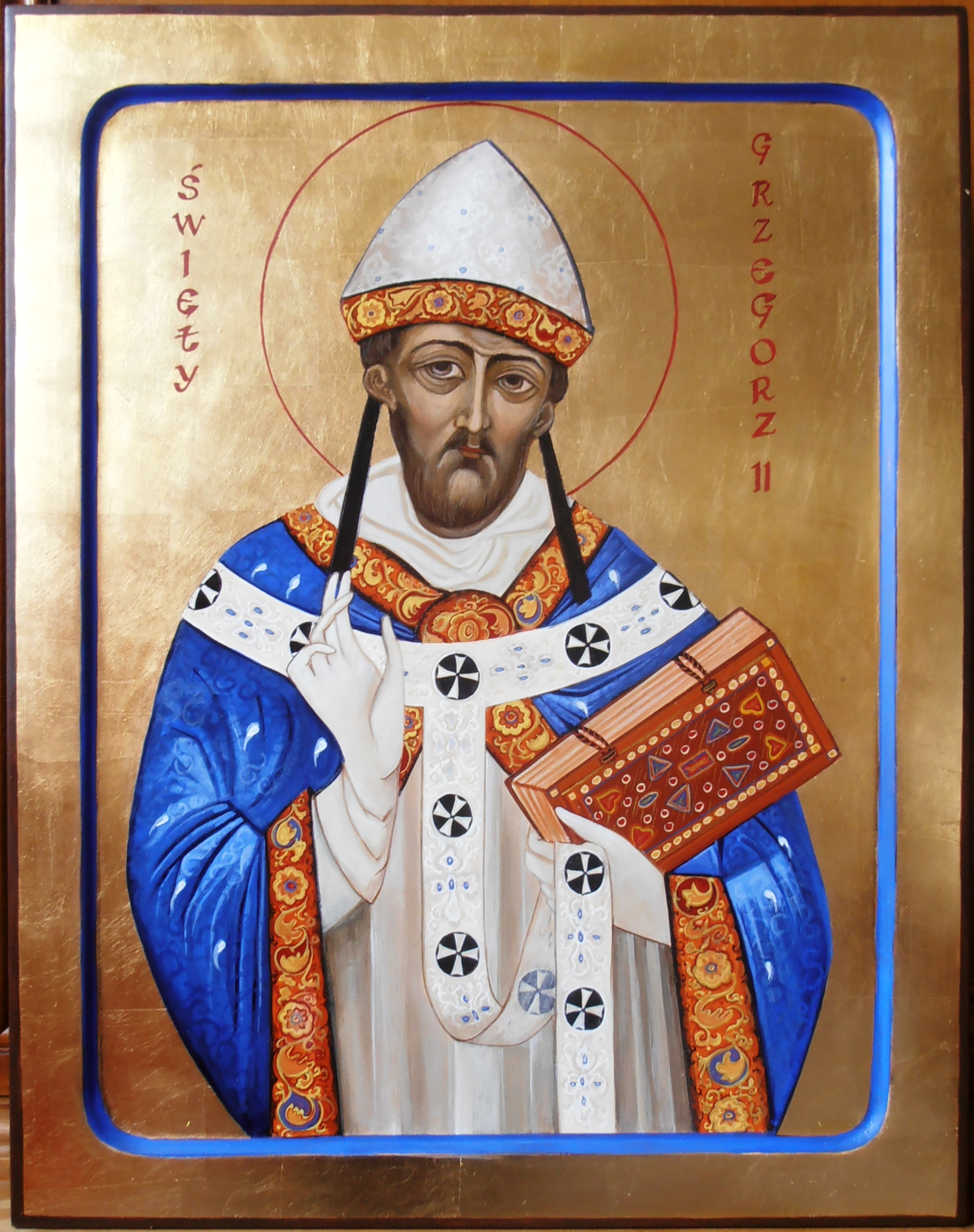
St. Gregory II, Pope of Rome.

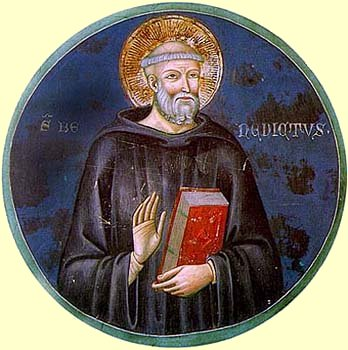
St. Benedict of Aniane.

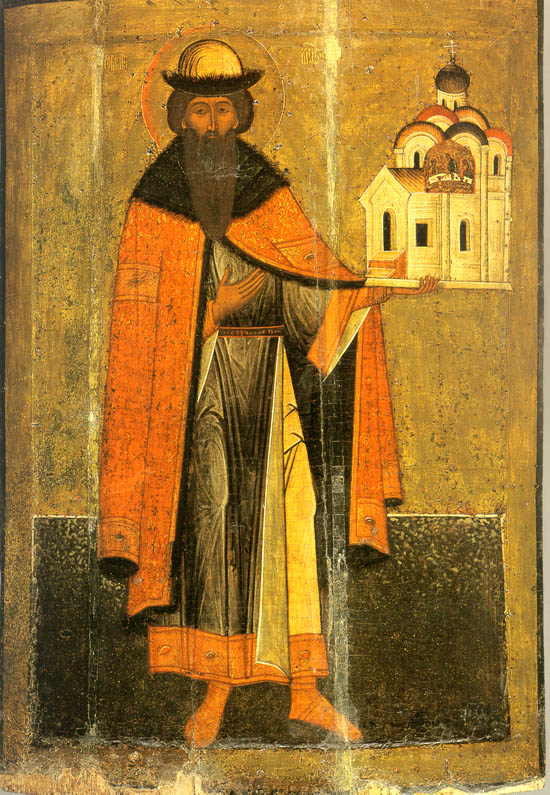
St. Gabriel of Pskov (Prince Vsevolod of Pskov)

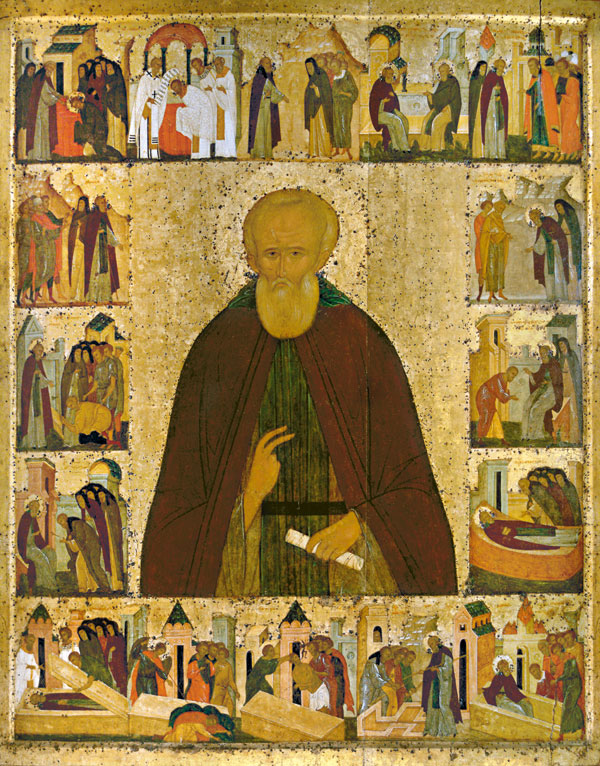
St. Demetrius, monk and wonderworker of Priluki Monastery, Vologda.

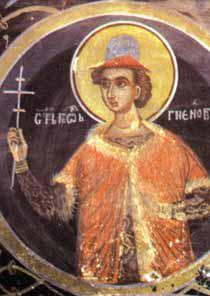
New Martyr George of Kratovo.

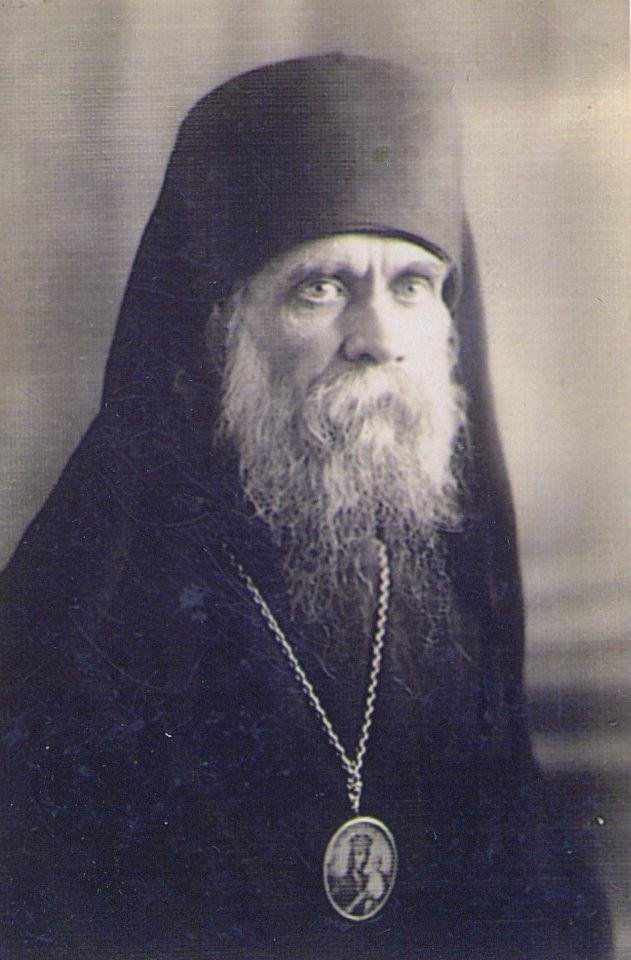
Archbishop Simon (Vinogradov) of Shanghai and Peking.

== Sources ==
- February 11 / 24. Orthodox Calendar (Pravoslavie.ru).
- February 24 / 11. Holy Trinity Russian Orthodox Church (A parish of the Patriarchate of Moscow).
- February 11. OCA - The Lives of the Saints.
- The Autonomous Orthodox Metropolia of Western Europe and the Americas. St. Hilarion Calendar of Saints for the year of our Lord 2004. St. Hilarion Press (Austin, TX). p. 14.
- The Eleventh Day of the Month of February. Orthodoxy in China.
- February 11. Latin Saints of the Orthodox Patriarchate of Rome.
- The Roman Martyrology. Transl. by the Archbishop of Baltimore. Last Edition, According to the Copy Printed at Rome in 1914. Revised Edition, with the Imprimatur of His Eminence Cardinal Gibbons. Baltimore: John Murphy Company, 1916. pp. 44–45.
- Rev. Richard Stanton. A Menology of England and Wales, or, Brief Memorials of the Ancient British and English Saints Arranged According to the Calendar, Together with the Martyrs of the 16th and 17th Centuries. London: Burns & Oates, 1892. pp. 62–63.

Greek Sources

- Great Synaxaristes: (in Greek) 11 Φεβρουαριου. Μεγασ Συναξαριστησ.
- (in Greek) Συναξαριστής. 11 Φεβρουαρίου. Ecclesia.gr. (H Εκκλησια Τησ Ελλαδοσ).

Russian Sources

- (in Russian) 24 февраля (11 февраля). Православная Энциклопедия под редакцией Патриарха Московского и всея Руси Кирилла (электронная версия). (Orthodox Encyclopedia - Pravenc.ru).
