= Julius von Szymanowski =

Russian surgeon

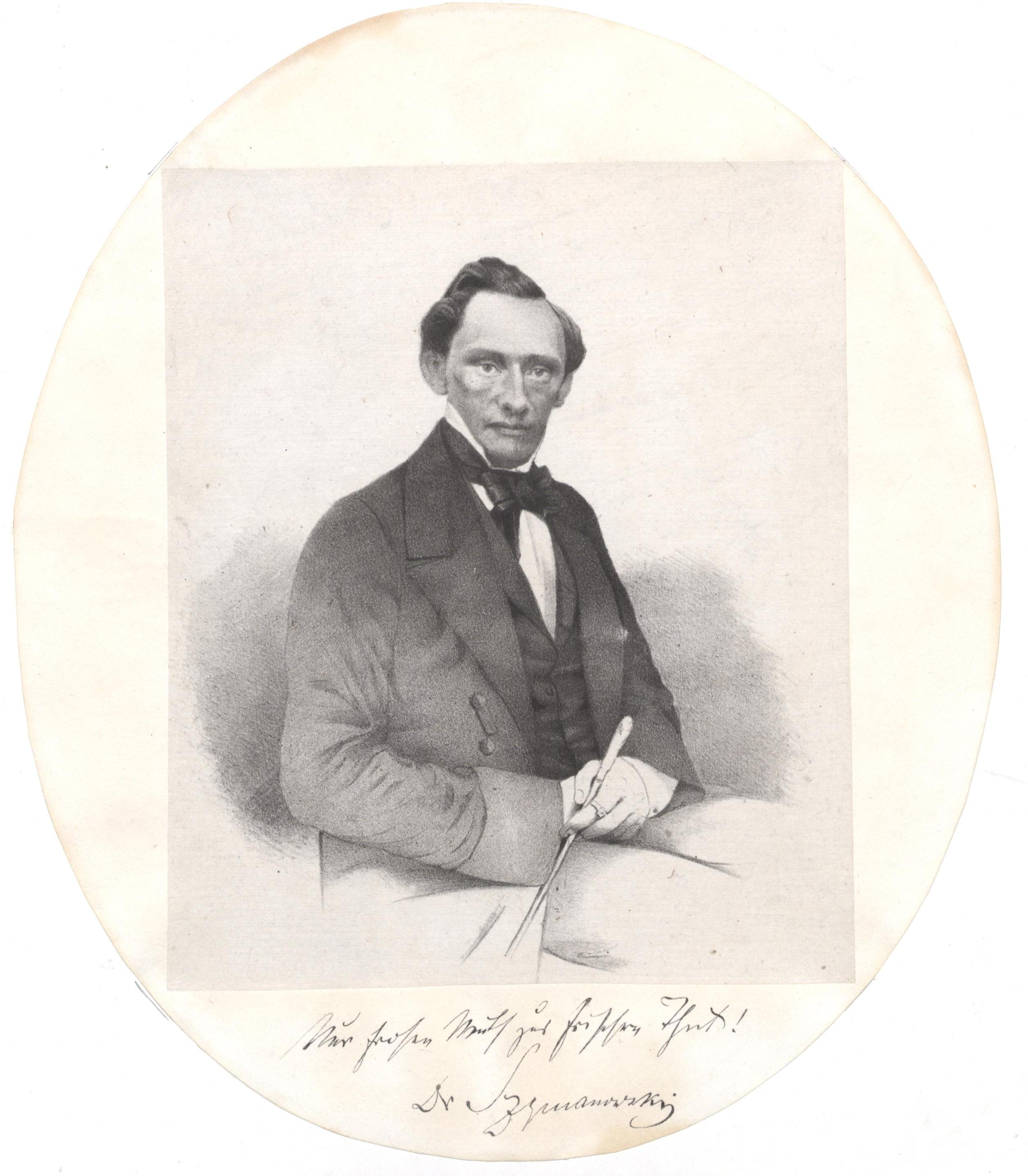
- Born: 10 February [O.S. 29 January] 1829; Riga, Russian Empire
- Died: 25 April [O.S. 13 April] 1868; Kiev, Russian Empire
- Education: University of Dorpat

Julius Alphonse Nikolai Szymanowski, Julij Karlovich Szymanowski (Юлий Карлович Шимановский; 10 February [O.S. 29 January] 1829 in Riga – 25 April [O.S. 13 April] 1868 in Kiev) was a Russian surgeon of Polish-German origin, professor at the University of Helsinki and University of Kiev, originator of many plastic surgery techniques, including the Kuhnt-Szymanowski method. Author of the surgical textbook Handbuch der Operativen Chirurgie (1870). A collection of his poems Was ich gelebt: Lieder was published posthumously (under the pseudonym Julius Steinborn).

== Early life ==
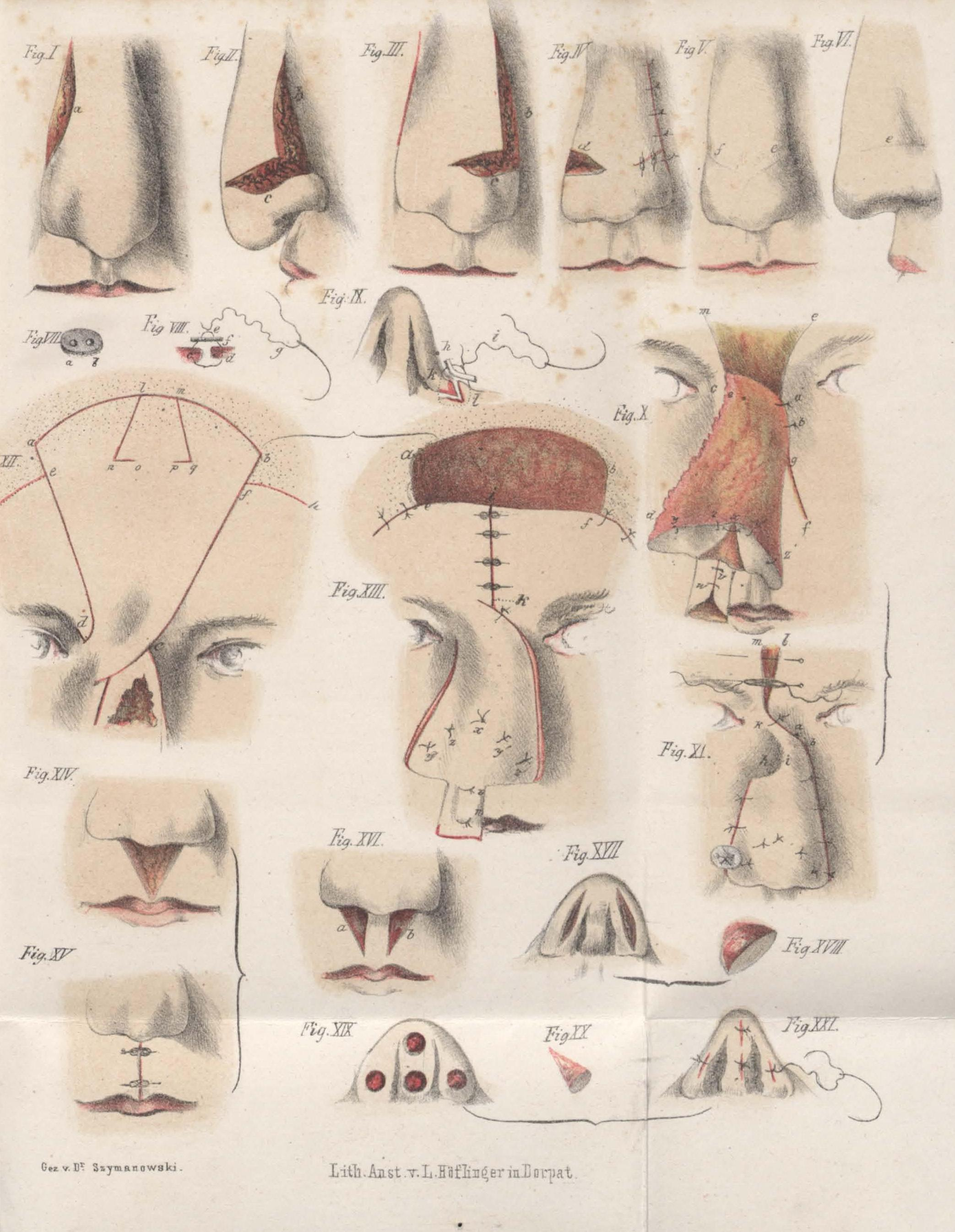
Plaque from Szymanowski's work on plastic surgery of the nose

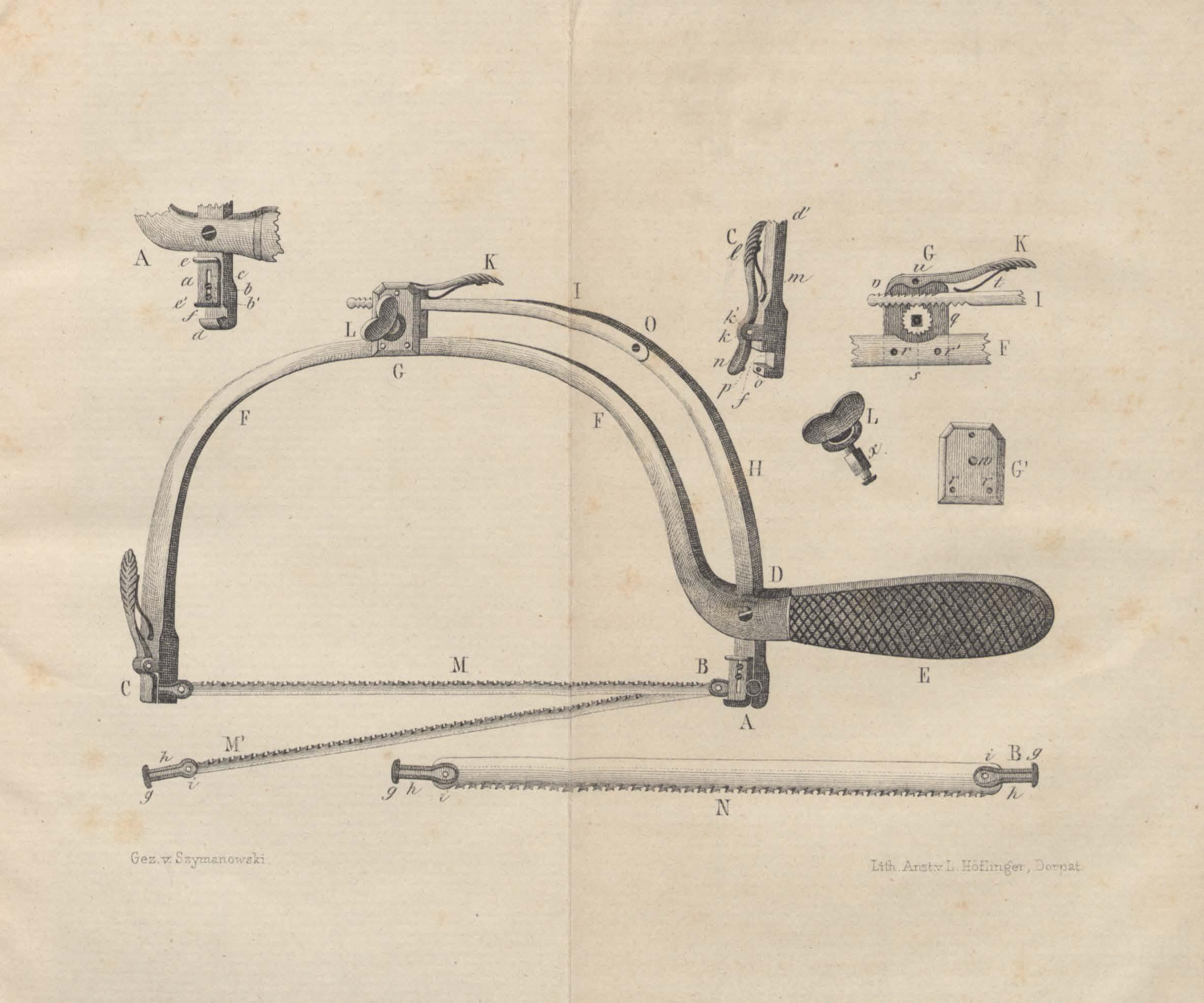
Surgical saw invented by Szymanowski

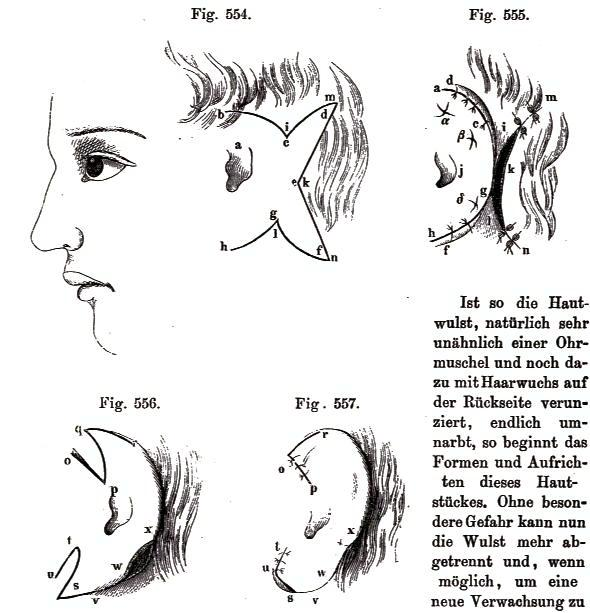
Illustration from Szymanowski's textbook, showing the technique of reconstructing an unformed auricle

He was born in Riga as the son of a civil servant Carl Szymanowski and his wife Helene, maiden name Kutzky. Szymanowski's ancestor was Polish and was sent to Courland on a diplomatic mission. In later generations, marriages were made to German women and the family converted to Protestantism. Julius did not know the Polish language. From the age of 11 he attended gymnasium in Reval and graduated with honors (he received a scholarship of 90 rubles). When he was about 12 years old, his father lost his fortune and the boy decided that from then on he would fend for himself. As a junior high school student, he manifested many talents and interests, took up painting and poetry, and founded a volunteer fire department with his schoolmates. However, he had no talent for languages and did poorly even in Russian.

From 1850 he studied medicine at University of Dorpat; his teacher of surgery was Georg Adelmann, and under his influence he decided to specialize in this field. During the Crimean War, when Adelmann was sent by order of the Tsar to Reval, Szymanowski, along with three other talented students, helped bandage French and English prisoners of war. During his student years, he engaged in such activities as gymnastics, took long-distance hikes and wrote poetry. He also became known as a talented inventor and devised, among other things, a new model of surgical saw, which he described in his doctoral dissertation.

After graduating in October 1856, he worked as an assistant in a surgical clinic and became a Privatdozent on 30 May 1857. In the years 1858–1861, he was an associate professor of surgery at the University of Helsinki and a consultant at Sveaborg Military Hospital.

From 1861, he was an associate professor at University of Kiev. In 1863, as a military surgeon, he served in the Russian troops suppressing the January Uprising.

He was awarded, among others, the Medal for Suppressing the Polish Rebellion (1864), the Order of St. Stanislaus, Third Class (1859), the Order of St. Anna, Third Class (1862) and Second Class (1866).

On 27 August 1860, in Helsinki, he married Adelaide von Rambach, daughter of an artillery colonel. Their son Vsevolod (1866–1934) was a distinguished beekeeper.

In 1866 he fell ill with testicular cancer. In the fall of 1866 he wrote to his teacher Adelmann asking for a consultation, but the latter, having set out for Kiev, fell ill on the way and had to turn back to Dorpat. That's when Szymanowski requested surgery from Pirogov, who performed a tumor resection. Two weeks later, Szymanowski underwent another operation performed by Vladimir Karavayev. In early 1868, hemoptysis betrayed the presence of lung metastases. The tumor also gave metastasis to the arm bones and to the stomach. In March, in a letter to his colleague Uhde, he wrote that he already "was one foot in the grave." He died suddenly, at 1 o'clock in the afternoon on 25 April that year, allegedly from a stroke caused by an embolism. He is buried in the Baikove Cemetery in Kiev. Memories of him were written by Walther and Fumagalli.

== Academic achievements ==
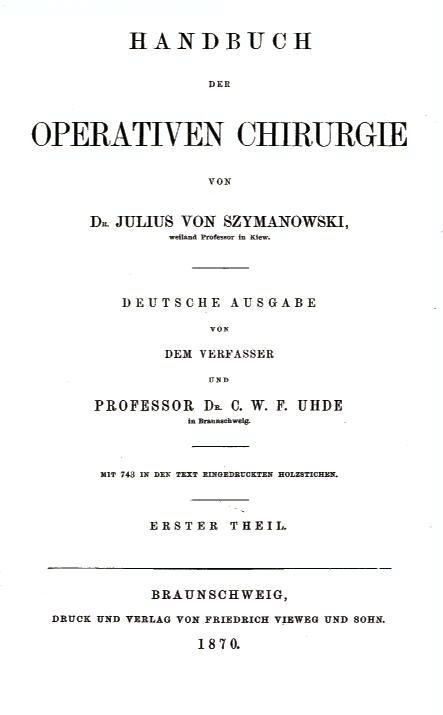
Title page of Szymanowski's textbook

Szymanowski's main interest was plastic surgery. His textbook Handbuch der Operativen Chirurgie is considered one of the most important published works in this field in the 19th century. His own engravings were later used by other plastic surgeons (including Kolle and Davis) to illustrate their own books.

The eyelid lift correction operation introduced by Szymanowski, modified by Hermann Kuhnt, was called the Kuhnt-Szymanowski method.

He devoted a separate monograph to rhinoplasty and its history, published in Dorpat in 1857. In it, he made an almost complete review of the 225 nasal reconstructions described in the medical literature and the techniques used by his predecessors - Branka, Bojani, Tagliacozzi, Lucas, Rust, von Graefe, Carpue, Reiner, Bünger, Dieffenbach, Pirogov, Mütter, Pancoast and Adelmann. In 1857, he also published his first article on plastic surgery in Prague's Vierteljahrschrift für die praktische Heilkunde; in it, he proposed minor modifications to rhinoplasty and cheiloplasty procedures. He described a case of congenital cleft soft palate co-occurring with a defect in the anterior pharyngeal wall.

Another area of Szymanowski's interest was desmurgy, to which he devoted a small atlas published in 1857 in Dorpat and a year later in Reval. In this book he presented and illustrated most of the various dressing techniques used at the time.

In the summer of 1859, he translated and improved Pirogov's textbook on the surgical anatomy of the arteries and fascia. During this time he also published a series of articles on various amputation techniques.

In 1862, he presented the invention of an instrument he called the "somatometer" for anthropometric measurements.

His work also included case reports and observations from many other surgical departments: inguinal hernias, genital abnormalities in infertile married couples, and the technique and complications of tracheotomy.

== Works ==
- Szymanowski, Julius (1856). Additamenta ad ossium resectionem : dissertatio inauguralis / quam consensu et auctoritate gratiosi medicorum ordinis in Universitate Literarum Caesarea Dorpatensi ad gradum doctoris medicinae rite adipiscendum loco consueto palam defendet auctor Julius Szymanowski (Thesis). Dorpati Liv: typ. viduæ J. C. Schünmanni et C. Mattieseni.
- Szymanowski, Julius (1857). Adnotationes ad rhinoplasticen : commentatio / quam consensu et auctoritate gratiosi medicorum ordinis in Universitate Literarum Caesarea Dorpatensi ad veniam legendi rite impetrandam palam defendet auctor Julius Szymanowski (Thesis). Dorpati Liv: typ. viduæ J. C. Schünmanni et C. Mattieseni.
- Der Gypsverband, mit besonderer Berücksichtigung der Militair-Chirurgie. St. Petersburg: Eggers & Co. 1857.
- Desmologische Bilder zum Selbstunterricht: 198 Abbildungen auf 27 Tafeln / von Dr. Szymanowski, Privatdocent an der Kaiserlichen Universität zu Dorpat, Assistent-Arzt der chir. Klinik daselbst; auf Stein gezeichnet von C. Schulz. Dorpat. 1857.
- "Beiträge zur Resection der Knochen". Zeitschrift für klinische Medicin. 8: 1–35. 1857.
- "Mit Wiederkehr der Functionsfähigkeit der Hand". Medizinische Zeitung Russlands. 14: 179–181. 1857.
- Desmologische Bilder für Ärzte und Studierende, 2. Auflage. Reval: F. Kluge. 1858.
- "Zur plastischen Chirurgie". Vierteljahrschrift für die praktische Heilkunde. 60: 127–152. 1858.
- "Resection des Fusses, eine Modification der Pirogoff'schen Osteoplastik". Medizinische Zeitung Russlands. 16: 73–76. 1859.
- "Beitrag zur Amputation nebst Erfahrungen über die Immersion und Irrigation". Vierteljahrschrift für die praktische Heilkunde. 65: 55–101. 1860.
- "Reise-Skizzen aus den chirurgischen Kliniken Deutschlands". Medizinische Zeitung Russlands. 17: 17, 25, 33, 41. 1860.
- "Zur conservativen Chirurgie". Deutsche Klinik. 12: 211–214. 1860.
- Wittich; Wagner, eds. (1861). "Ueber Resectionen und Transplantation des Periosts bei Amputationen". Amtlicher Bericht über die fünf und dreissigste Versammlung Deutscher Naturforscher und Ärzte in Königsberg in Preussen im September 1860. Königsberg. pp. 193–196.
- Simelius; Helsingfors (1861). Der Tod durch Erstickung vermittelst eines Knebels aut durch Branntwein (ein Alkoholungsglück): eine Skizze aus der gerichtsärztlichen Praxis im Lichte chirurgischer Erfahrungen. p. 78.
- Pirogoff N (1861). Chirurgische Anatomie der Arterienstämme und Fascien, neu bearbeitet von J. Szymanowski. Leipzig u. Heidelberg.
- "Kritik der partiellen Fussamputationen gestüzt auf eine neue anatomische Deutung der Architectur des Fusses". Archiv für klinische Chirurgie. 1: 366–407. 1861.
- "Ein Somatometer und dessen Anwendung". Vierteljahrschrift für die praktische Heilkunde. 76: 1–25. 1862.
- "Ueber Gyps und Wasser in der Chirurgie". Archiv der Heilkunde. 3: 339, 395. 1862.
- "Zur Casuistik der chirurgischen Plastik". Archiv der Heilkunde. 3: 517–529. 1862.
- Краткое руководство к практическим упражнениям в десмологии для врачей и студентов. Киев: Унив. тип., 1862
- Гипсовая повязка. 1, 2, 3. История неподвижных повязок. [Соч.] Ю. Шимановского. Пер. с нем. Н. Гейнац. Последнее упрощение неподвижной повязки и употребление гипсовой повязки на различных частях тела / Сост по указаниям Ю. Шимановского лекарем Шатковским. Гипсовая повязка на поле сражения и проект улучшения средств для транспорта раненых / Сост. под руководством Ю. Шимановского лекарем Кишко-Жгерским. Санкт-Петербург: тип. Я. Трея, 1863
- "Klinische Erfahrungen über die partielle Brustbein-Resection". Deutsche Klinik. 15: 306–308. 1863.
- "Rectovaginalfistel; neues Nadelinstrument; Application Sülzerscher Klammern in der Scheide; künstlicher Prolapsus, ani gegen sonst unoperirbare Rectovaginalfistel". Vierteljahrschrift für die praktische Heilkunde. 83: 13–19. 1864.
- "Die Verachsung des weichen Gaumens mit der hintern Pharynxwand". Vierteljahrschrift für die praktische Heilkunde. 81: 59–67. 1864.
- "Nachtrag zu dem im 81. Bande veröffentlichten Aufsatze: Verwachsung des weichen Gaumens mit der hintern Pharynxwand". Vierteljahrschrift für die praktische Heilkunde. 82: 142–144. 1864.
- "Ueber einige erworbene und angeborene Fehler in und an den Genitalien kinderloser Eheleute". Vierteljahrschrift für die praktische Heilkunde. 83: 1–30. 1864.
- Оперативная хирургия. Киев: тип. Ун-та св. Владимира, 1864
- Операции на поверхности человеческого тела: С атласом, содержащим на 108 табл. 602 рис. Киев: тип. И. и А. Давиденко, 1865
- "Ueber Neurektomie und Nervennaht". Vierteljahrschrift für die praktische Heilkunde. 88: 52–71. 1865.
- "Ueber die Resection des Hüftgelenkes". Archiv für klinische Chirurgie. 6: 787–790. 1865.
- "Hernia lateralis (!) cerebri [in einem Falle die Encephalocele erst bei der Operation erkannt, letztere noch mit Erhaltung des Lebens unterbrochen, in einem zweiten Falle die Diagnose schon durch die Hautbedeckungen möglich]". Archiv für klinische Chirurgie. 6: 560–572. 1866.
- "Ueber die Gritti'sche Operation". Centralblatt für die medicinischen Wissenschaften. 4: 2–4. 1866.
- "Die Rechtfertigung der Gritti'schen Operation durch Wort und That". Vierteljahrschrift für die praktische Heilkunde. 90: 36–73. 1866.
- "Erfolgreiche Olecranon- und Patella-Transplantationen". Centralblatt für die medicinischen Wissenschaften. 4: 529–531. 1866.
- "Die 'Wilde' Amputation in unseren Tagen". St. Petersburger medicinische Wochenschrift. 13: 45–52. 1867.
- "Noch ein Wort über den Gypsverband, dem fälschlich genannten 'Faullenzer in der Chirurgie'". Berliner klinische Wochenschrift. 4: 371. 1867.
- "Die methodische Gliedabnahme". Deutsche Klinik. 19: 27. 1867.
- "Würdigung der physikalischen Gesetze beim Eisenbahnapparat". Berliner klinische Wochenschrift. 5: 121. 1868.
- Военно-хирургические письма. Киев: Е.Я. Федоров, 1868
- Was ich gelebt: Lieder. Meyer. 1868.
- "Der Inguinaltestikel". Vierteljahrschrift für die praktische Heilkunde. 98: 56–71. 1868.
- Handbuch der operativen Chirurgie. Deutsche Ausg. von dem Verfasser und C. W. F. Uhde. Braunschweig: F. Vieweg u. Sohn. 1870.

== Sources ==
- "Шимановский, Юлий Карлович" . Brockhaus and Efron Encyclopedic Dictionary (in Russian). 1906.
