= Toplica, Prilep =

Toplica Топлица
- Village
- Location within North Macedonia
- Country: North Macedonia
- Region: Pelagonia
- Municipality: Prilep
- Elevation: 568 m (1,864 ft)

Population (2002)
  - Total: 5
- Time zone: UTC+1 (CET)
- Area code: +389/48/4XXXXX

Toplica (Macedonian: Топлица) is a village in Municipality of Prilep, North Macedonia.

== Demographics ==
According to the 2002 census, the village had a total of 5 inhabitants. Ethnic groups in the village include:

- Macedonians 5
