= Hermann Kuhnt =

German ophthalmologist (1850–1925)

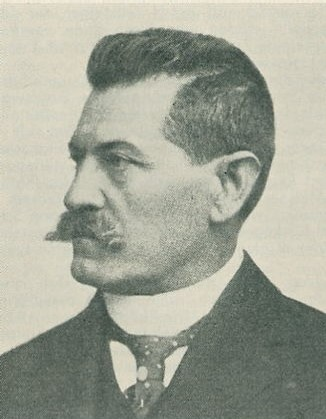

Hermann Kuhnt (14 April 1850 – 31 October 1925) was a German ophthalmologist born in Senftenberg, Brandenburg.

He studied medicine in Bonn, Berlin and Würzburg, and following graduation worked at the anatomy institute in Rostock under Friedrich Sigmund Merkel (1845–1919). Afterwards he became assistant to ophthalmologist Otto Becker (1828–1890) at the University Eye Clinic in Heidelberg. In 1880 he moved to the University of Jena, where in 1881 he was appointed professor of ophthalmology. Around 1892 he began serving as a professor at the University of Königsberg.

From 1870 he was a member of the Corps Rhenania Bonn.

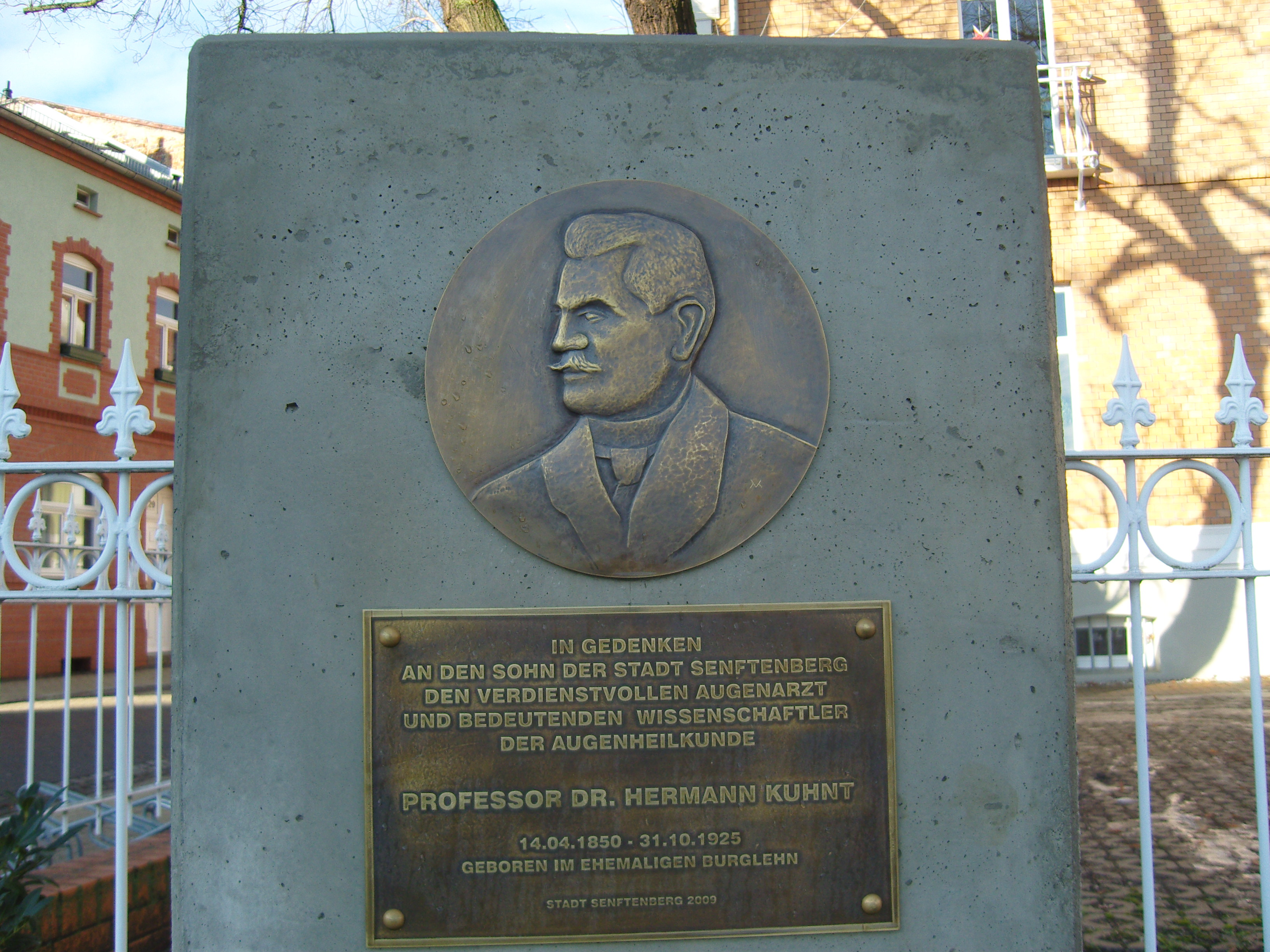
Memorial in Senftenberg

In 1899 with Julius von Michel (1843–1911), he founded the ophthalmic journal Zeitschrift für Augenheilkunde. The following two eponyms are named after him:

- Kuhnt-Junius degeneration: Also known as disciform macular degeneration; named with Paul Junius (1871–1948).
- Kuhnt's spaces: Shallow diverticula or recesses between the ciliary body and the Zonule of Zinn which open into the eye's posterior chamber.

== Selected publications ==
- Beitrage zur Operativen Augenheilkunde, (1883)
- Über die Therapie der Conjunctivitis granulosa, (1897)
- Über die Verwerthbarkeit der Bindehaut in der praktischen und in der operativen Augenheilkunde, (1898)
- Die scheibenförmige Entartung der Netzhautmitte (Degeneratio maculae luteae disciformis), (1926); with Paul Junius
