= Robert Bonnet (physician) =

German anatomist

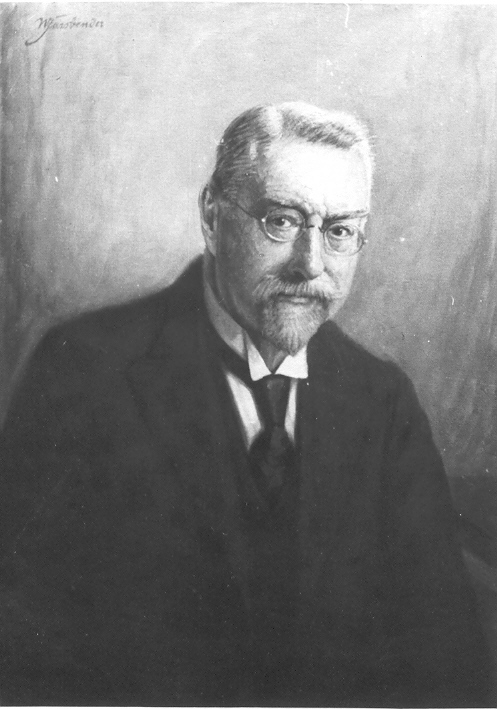
Robert Bonnet

Robert Bonnet (17 February 1851 – 13 October 1921) was a German anatomist who was born in Augsburg.

In 1876 he received his doctorate at Munich, where in 1880 he began work as an assistant at the anatomical institute. The following year, he was appointed professor at the Königliche Centraltierarzneischule in Munich. In 1889 he became an associate professor at the University of Würzburg, and two years later was appointed full professor of anatomy and director of the anatomical institute at Giessen. Later in his career, he served as a professor at the Universities of Greifswald (from 1895) and Bonn (from 1907).

Bonnet was the author of many scientific works, including numerous studies dealing with the anatomy and embryology of domesticated animals. He was co-editor of Ergebnisse der Anatomie und Entwicklungsgeschichte ("Results on anatomy and historical development"), and collaborated with Friedrich Sigmund Merkel (1845-1919) on Anatomische Hefte ("Anatomical books").
