= Robert von Welz =

German physician and ophthalmologist

- Born: 15 December 1814; Kelheim, Kingdom of Prussia
- Died: 12 November 1878 (aged 63); Würzburg, Kingdom of Bavaria, German Empire
- Education: University of Würzburg
- Medical career
- Profession: University of Würzburg
- Field: Physician
- Sub-specialties: Ophthalmology

Robert von Welz (15 December 1814 in Kelheim – 12 November 1878 in Würzburg) was a German medical doctor and ophthalmologist.

From 1832 he studied sciences and medicine at the University of Würzburg, receiving his medical doctorate in 1838. For several years he worked as an assistant physician at the Juliusspital in Würzburg, then in 1849 traveled to Paris, where he conducted research of syphilis. In Paris he became engaged in a dispute with Philippe Ricord in regard to the transferability of syphilis. His interests later turned to ophthalmology, and in 1854/55 he studied the subject with Albrecht von Graefe in Berlin. In 1857 he opened an eye clinic in Würzburg, and in 1866 he was named a professor of ophthalmology at the university. At the time of his death, the eye clinic was acquired by the University of Würzburg.

He was known for his development of various medical devices, such as an apparatus for the inhalation of ether and an instrument used for enucleation.

== Selected works ==
- Asklepiadus hygieina parangelmata des Asklepiades von Bithynien Gesundheitsvorschriften, 1841.
- Die einathmung der aether-dämpfe in ihrer verschiedenen wirkungsweise, 1847 – The inhalation of ether fumes, etc.
- Deux résponses à deux lettres de M. le docteur Ricord sur la syphilis, 1850 – Two responses to two letters of Dr. Ricord in regards to syphilis.
- De l'Inoculation de la syphilis aux animaux, 1850 – Inoculation of syphilis involving animals.
- Die Einimpfung der Syphilis auf Thiere, 1851 – Inoculation of syphilis involving animals.
- Die Iridectomie der peripherischen Linearextraction vorausgeschickt, 1873 – The iridectomy of peripheral linear extraction premised.
