= Diocese of Voronezh =

Diocese of the Russian Orthodox Church

Coordinates: 51.6600°N 39.1972°E

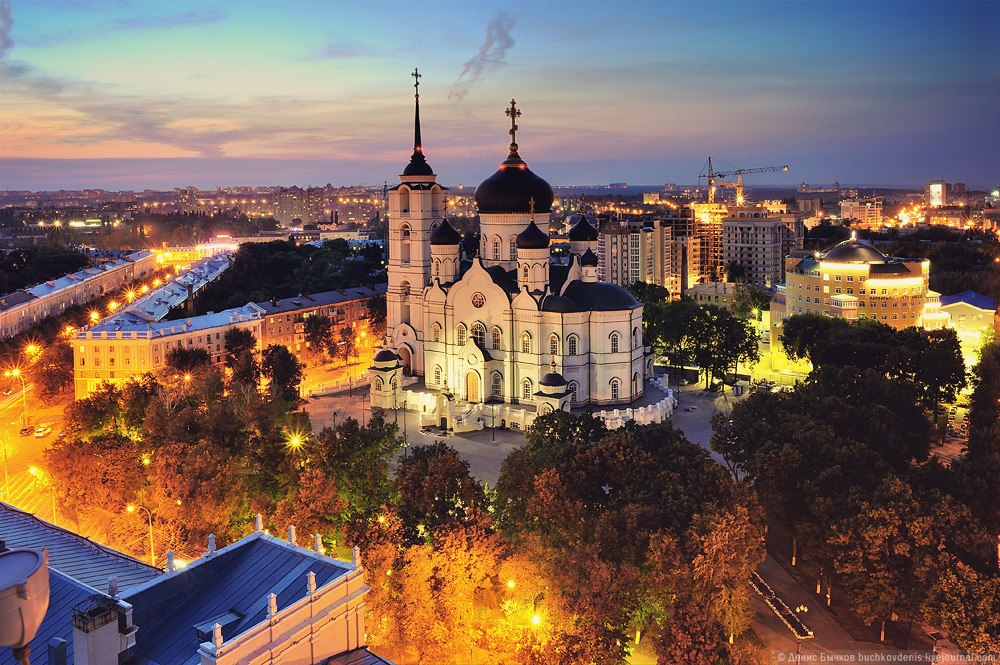
- Annunciation Cathedral

Location
- Headquarters: Voronezh

Information
- Denomination: Eastern Orthodox
- Sui iuris church: Russian Orthodox Church
- Established: 1682
- Language: Old Church Slavonic
- Governance: Eparchy

Website
- vob-eparhia.ru

The Diocese of Voronezh (Russian: Воронежская епархия) is an eparchy of the Russian Orthodox Church with its center in the city of Voronezh. It Combines parishes and monasteries in the Voronezh Oblast. The official holiday is on August 28.

== History ==
Until the establishment of the Diocese of Voronezh area occupied by the Voronezh Governorate, in church affairs was subject to a part of the Ryazan and Krutitsy dioceses.

Great Moscow Synod of 1666-1667 made the decision on the elevation of the Archdiocese of Ryazan into metropolia status and establishing within it two dioceses - Tambov and Voronezh. The need to open the Voronezh diocese confirmed Moscow Council of 1681–1682. The see was established on November 27, 1681. On April 2, 1682 saint Metrophanes was ordained for it.

Initially, the diocese included the city of Voronezh, Yelets, Olrlov, Kostyonsk from Ryazan diocese; Uryv, Korotoyak, Zemlyansk from Belgorod diocese. In 1692 the construction of Annunciation Cathedral was ended in Voronezh. Many churches were built during ruling of st Mitrophanes, monastic life and charity were organized.

After the conquest of Azov in 1696 the diocese border moved to the Sea of Azov, on its territory were newly built city of Taganrog and Paul Fortress (now Pavlovsk). As a result of a territorial dispute with the bishop of Ryazan, which was approved by Tsar Peter I of Russia in 1699 in favor of the Diocese of Voronezh, the latter were given towns: Usman, Demshinsk, Belokolodsk and village Morky Buyerak. In the same year Ostrogozhsk was attached to the diocese from Diocese of Belgorod.

In the years 1700-1704 from the Diocese of Voronezh was a short-term Azov to the newly allocated to the southern lands.

In 1712-1714, the locum tenens of the patriarchal throne Metropolitan Stephan (Yavorsky) of Ryazan, unsuccessfully tried to abolish the Voronezh diocese and return the territory to the Ryazan see. Contrary to this, the area of the Voronezh diocese was expanded even more — in 1718-1720, lands along the Don and Khopyor rivers were transferred to it from the Patriarchal Oblast, and in 1720 parts of the Ryazan department were annexed. Metropolitan Pachomius (Shpakovsky) launched large construction works, the construction of the new cathedral continued until 1735. Bishop Joachim (Strukov) paid much attention to spiritual education — he organized schools for the children of clergymen in Voronezh at the bishop's house and in Ostrogozhsk. Under subsequent bishops, the Slavonic-Latin school at the Divnogorsk Assumption Monastery was opened in 1742, and on May 31, 1745, the Voronezh Theological Seminary was opened. In 1749, part of the lands of the Tambov diocese was transferred to the Voronezh see, but in 1758 these lands were again transferred to the renewed Tambov see. In 1765, the Voronezh diocese increased due to part of the Krutitsky, Kolomna and Ryazan dioceses. Saint Tikhon of Zadonsk who ruled the diocese during 1763-1767 strengthened the spiritual and moral foundations of the life of the diocese, primarily in monasteries.

In 1775, part of the Moscow diocese transferred to the Voronezh diocese, and the Azov lands were transferred to the newly formed Slavic diocese. In 1788, a significant part of the northern and northwestern lands of the diocese (430 churches and 6 monasteries) were transferred to neighboring dioceses. Until the end of the 18th century, Yelets was transferred to the Oryol diocese. In 1797, six counties of the Voronezh province were transferred to the Sloboda Ukraine Governorate. At the end of the 18th century, the Voronezh bishops ruled the Don Host Oblast (143 churches), part of the Slobozhanshchina (99 churches), as well as 154 churches in the Tambov, Ryazan and Saratov Governorates.

In 1799, the borders of the dioceses were brought into line with the borders of the governorates, all lands outside the Voronezh Governorate were transferred to other sees.

In 1829, the Diocese of Voronezh was allocated Novocherkassk.

In 1926, the territory of the Voronezh diocese joined with the city of Tambov diocese of Sts. In 1934, part of the Voronezh diocese, including the newly formed region of Belgorod, Kursk walked to the lectern. In 1954, the Voronezh diocese included the territory of the newly Lipetsk region, Saratov and Rostov dioceses were transferred to the newly formed land Balashovskaya Kamensky and regions. In 1957, the last two regions were disbanded, its territories back to the Voronezh diocese.

On May 7, 2003, the Lipetsk Diocese was separated from the Voronezh Diocese within the Lipetsk Oblast; the Voronezh Diocese was limited to the Voronezh Oblast.
