= Austrebertha =

Roman Catholic saint from France (630–704)

Saint Austrebertha
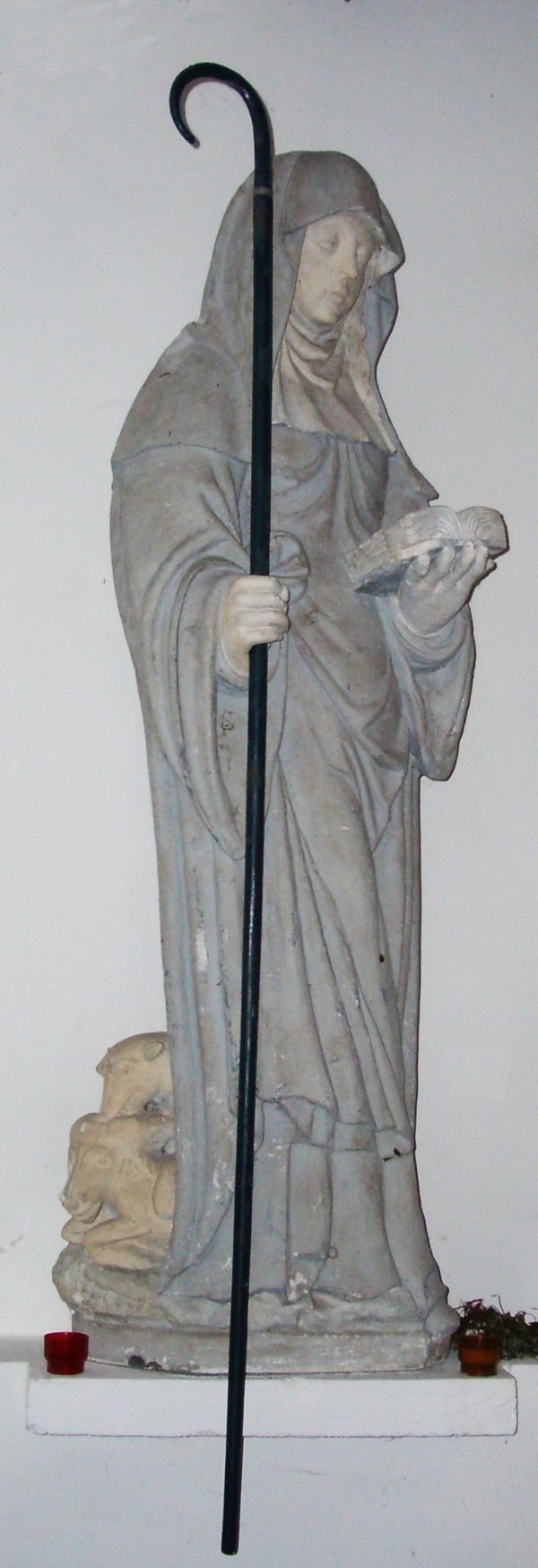
- Statue of Austrebertha
- Born: 630; Therouanne, Artois
- Died: 704; Pavilly, Normandy
- Venerated in: Catholic Church; Eastern Orthodox Church
- Canonized: Pre-Congregation
- Feast: 10 February
- Attributes: wolf; depicted as a nun

Austrebertha (Austreberta, Eustreberta, Austreberta of Pavilly; French: Austreberthe) (630–February 10, 704) was a French nun of the Middle Ages, who took the veil very young, and became a nun at the Port Monastery in the Ponthieu. She became abbess to the foundation of Pavilly, where she died at the beginning of the eighth century, at 74. She is venerated as a saint in the Catholic and Eastern Orthodox Churches. Her feast day is February 10.

== Life ==
The daughter of Saint Framechildis and the Count Palatine Badefrid, she was born about 630 in Thérouanne, Pas-de-Calais. She refused to be part of an arranged marriage and in around 656 entered the Port-le-Grand Monastery in Ponthieu. She received the veil from Saint Omer before founding another monastery in Marconne in Artois in the house of her parents. She later established a monastery at Pavilly.

Although not well known outside of Upper Normandy, Austreberthe was said to have performed miracles during her lifetime. It was said that the water of a spring appeared in a chapel and gave rise to a river that had healing properties for the disabled and lame.

There is a chapel in an open field, in Saint-Denis-le-Ferment, in the Eure where a pilgrimage takes place on Whit Monday. Some of her relics are said to have been brought to Canterbury by the Normans.

There are two towns in France named Sainte-Austreberthe for her: one in Pas-de-Calais département and another in Seine-Maritime département.

== Austrebertha and the wolf ==
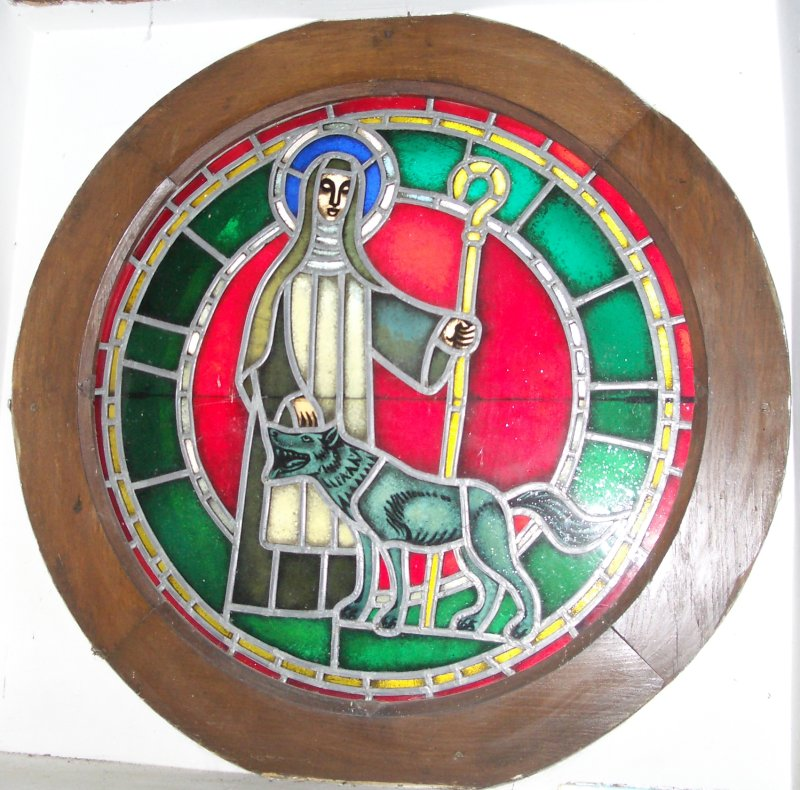
Stained glass window depicting Austrebertha and the wolf

A popular legend told of Austrebertha states that Austreberthe and her nuns used to wash the sacristy cloths of the abbey of Jumieges a few leagues distant from Pavilly. A donkey used to carry the linen from one monastery to another. One day, while looking for the donkey, she came across a wolf. The wolf admitted to killing the donkey and begged for forgiveness. Austrebertha reprimanded the wolf, but forgave him and commanded that he carry the laundry himself, a task that the wolf performed for the rest of its life.

At the place of the death of the donkey a chapel was erected in the seventh century; then, when it fell into ruin, a simple stone cross replaced it. It, in turn, was later replaced by an oak, in which was placed a statue of the Virgin.

This tale is depicted in the stained glass window of the chapel in the village of Sainte-Austreberthe.
