= Canton of Clères =

Coordinates: 49°34′48″N 1°08′48″E

Clères
- Former canton
- Interactive map of Clères
- Country: France
- Region: Normandy
- Department: Seine-Maritime
- No. of communes: {{{nbcomm}}}
- Disbanded: 2015
- Area: 192.57 km^{2} (74.35 sq mi)
- Population (2012): 22,992
  - Density: 119.40/km^{2} (309.23/sq mi)

The Canton of Clères is a former canton situated in the Seine-Maritime département and in the Haute-Normandie region of northern France. It was disbanded following the French canton reorganisation which came into effect in March 2015. It had a total of 22,992 inhabitants (2012).

== Geography ==
An area of farmland and forests in the arrondissement of Rouen, centred on the town of Clères. The altitude varies from 42m (Montville) to 186 m (Le Bocasse) with an average altitude of 147m.

The canton comprised 22 communes:

- Anceaumeville
- Authieux-Ratiéville
- Le Bocasse
- Bosc-Guérard-Saint-Adrien
- Cailly
- Claville-Motteville
- Clères
- Eslettes
- Esteville
- Fontaine-le-Bourg
- Frichemesnil
- Grugny
- La Houssaye-Béranger
- Mont-Cauvaire
- Montville
- Quincampoix
- La Rue-Saint-Pierre
- Saint-André-sur-Cailly
- Saint-Georges-sur-Fontaine
- Saint-Germain-sous-Cailly
- Sierville
- Yquebeuf

== Population ==
Historical population Canton of Clères
Year	1962	1968	1975	1982	1990	1999
Pop.	13,236	14,237	15,224	17,757	19,244	21,068
±%	—	+7.6%	+6.9%	+16.6%	+8.4%	+9.5%
From the year 1962 on: No double counting – residents of multiple communes (e.g. students and military personnel) are counted only once. Source: INSEE

== See also ==
- Arrondissements of the Seine-Maritime department
- Cantons of the Seine-Maritime department
- Communes of the Seine-Maritime department
