= 1845 Montville tornado =

1845 tornado in Normandy

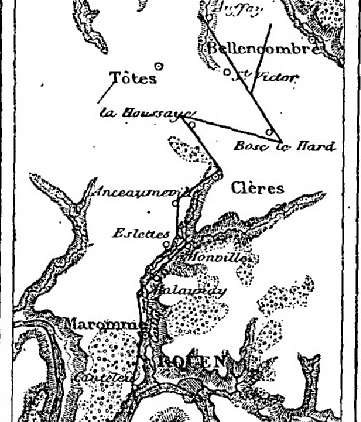
- The zigzag path of the tornado as illustrated by Frédéric Zurcher and Élie Philippe Margollé (Trombes et cyclones, 1876).
- Location: Areas surrounding Montville in Seine-Maritime, France

Meteorological history
- Date: August 19, 1845

IF5 tornado
- on the International Fujita scale

T10 tornado
- on the TORRO scale
- Path length: 9.3 miles (15 km)
- Highest winds: 270 mph (430 km/h)

Overall effects
- Fatalities: 75

The Montville tornado, also called the Montville waterspout at the time, was a tornado that struck Normandy in France in 1845. It is the deadliest tornado ever recorded in France with 75 deaths. Forming on 19 August, 1845, it caused significant damage in the industrial valley of Malaunay and Montville, in the Department of Seine-Maritime. The worst of the damage from the tornado was rated EF5 by the Tornadoes and Severe Storms French Observatory (KERAUNOS), with the European Severe Storms Laboratory acknowledging the EF5 rating as its "maximum intensity", though ESSL also rated the tornado F5. TORRO rated the tornado T10, later changed to IF5. This was the first of two tornados in French history to receive a rating of F5, EF5, or IF5, the other being a tornado that occurred in Pas-de-Calais in 1967.

== Meteorological synopsis ==
Around midday, a storm broke out in the Rouen region, causing heavy rain. The tornado formed around 1 PM near the commune of Le Houlme and moved through the Cailly valley towards Malaunay, quickly acquiring gigantic force. On its path, it destroyed homes and uprooted hundreds of trees, some of which were swept away whole in the tornado. In the industrial valley, three large mills, at least one of which was newly built, were leveled and partly swept clean. One of the mills was a four-story structure that likely collapsed. Large debris was carried 30 km (19 mi) and mature trees were thrown "very far." In Malaunay, the Neveu spinning mill, a solid four-story building, was destroyed, followed by the Mare Frères workshops in the same commune and the Picquot-Deschamps spinning mill in Montville.

According to analyses at the time, the tornado continued its path through the forests of Clères until it had travelled around 15 kilometres (9.3 mi) in total, before dissipating near the commune of Grugny.

== See also ==
- List of European tornadoes and tornado outbreaks
- List of disasters in France by death toll
