= Delamare-Deboutteville =

French car designed in 1884

Delamare-Deboutteville was among the earliest designs of car, driven by an internal combustion engine. It was developed in France by Édouard Delamare-Deboutteville and patented in 1884, but did not achieve commercial success.

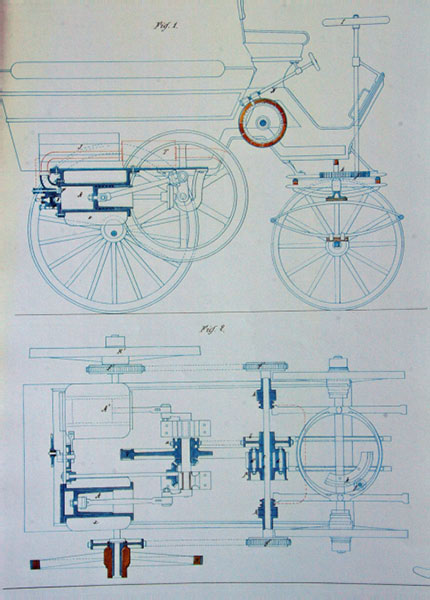
Diagrams from patent of the Delamare-Deboutteville design

== Development ==
Édouard Delamare-Deboutteville described how, with his assistant Leon Malandin, he had built and driven his car in early 1884. The car had a front bench seat and a rear platform, four wheels, a transmission to the rear wheels by chain, shaft transmission and a differential. In 1883 Edouard Delamare-Deboutteville made a trial run of a car whose engine was powered by gas; but the gas supply hose broke during this first trial, so he replaced the gas with fuel oil. In order to use this product, he invented a wick carburetor. This vehicle travelled for the first time on the little road from Fontaine-le-Bourg to Cailly in Normandy in early February 1884. On 12 February 1884, he registered his design under patent number 160267.

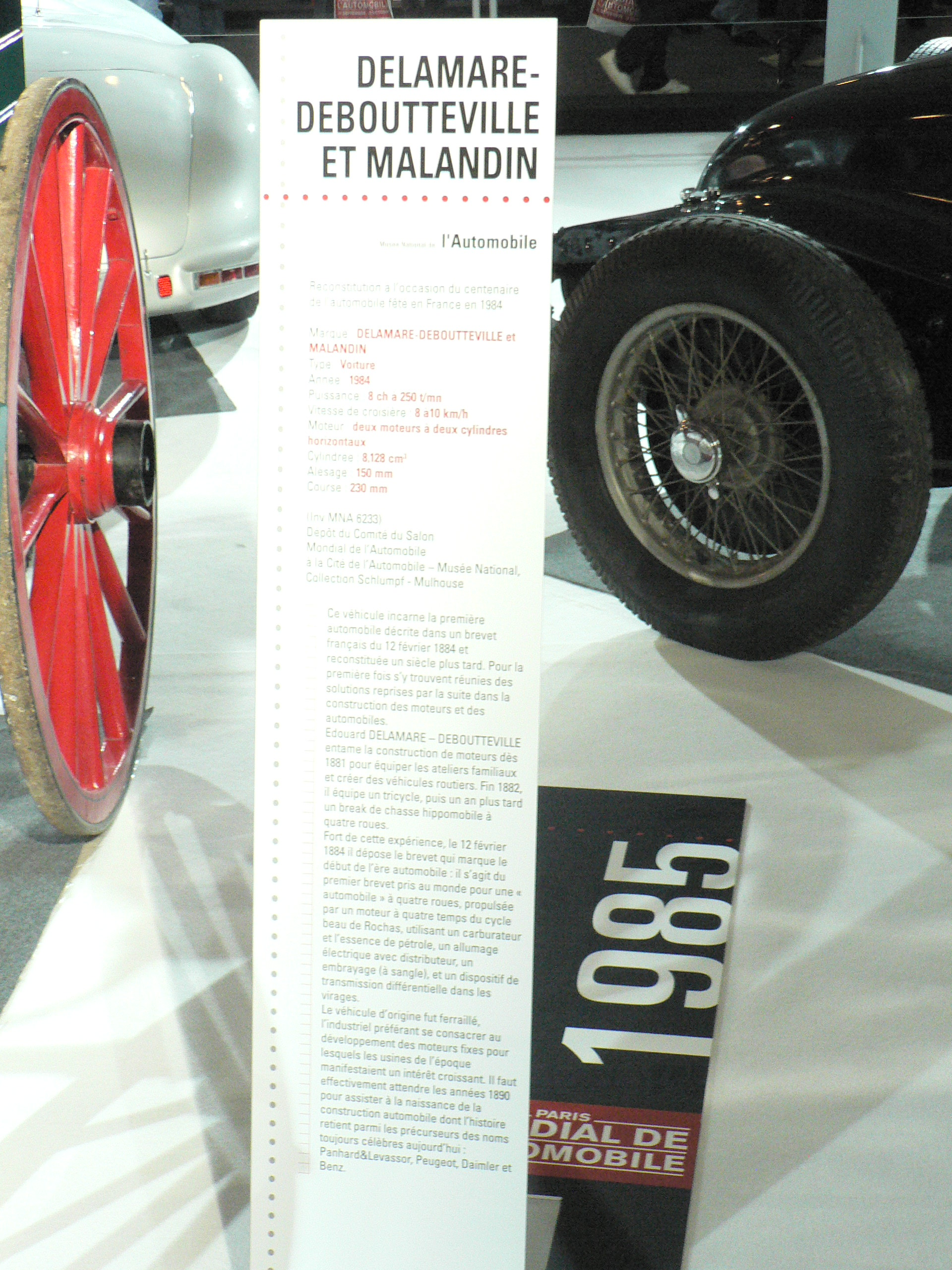
Reconstruction from Mondial de l'automobile exhibition in Paris

Several replicas were made of the Delamare-Deboutteville design and have been entered in all kinds of different events.

== Claim of precedence ==
It seems incontestable that Delamare-Deboutteville did build the first four-wheeled vehicle powered by an internal combustion (IC) four-stroke engine running on gas oil, preceding the model developed by Karl Benz. However, vehicles developed by Delamare-Deboutteville were far from functioning properly, some exploding during their brief use, and they never went into production. Although these pre-dated Benz and Daimler's first vehicles, for these reasons some think it cannot be considered the first car. In addition, earlier experiments were made with IC-engined vehicles in Switzerland (de Rivaz), France (Lenoir), and Austria (Marcus).

The French have also claimed that Panhard & Levassor and Peugeot had laid the foundation for the automobile and not Daimler and Benz. Benz was probably the first to go into car production in 1888, after producing experimental cars from 1885-1887. Daimler, who also built early experimental cars from 1886–1889, began to slowly turn out some production cars starting around 1890. Also, both Peugeot and Panhard began car production by using Daimler engines, and were inspired to produce cars due to Daimler's exhibition of his 1889 steel-wheeled car in Paris. Benz's car was built by Émile Roger in Paris, garnering more sales than Benz himself, and Benz's designs were copied by many French makers for their first cars.

== Édouard Delamare-Deboutteville ==
From this experience, Delamare-Deboutteville developed large engines up to 7,000 hp (5,200 kW), which he presented at the Universal Exhibition in Paris in 1889 where he won the first prize. He was, however, much more focused on mechanical methods to modernize the family's cotton factory.

The life of Édouard Delamare-Deboutteville was filled with research and travel. Born in about 1856, he wrote a few treatises on mussel culture and three volumes of Sanskrit grammar. He created in Carantec in the Bay of Morlaix and in the Aber Benoît (Finistère) an oyster farm which still exists, and left a collection of birds and some philosophical studies. He died of typhoid fever in February 1901 at the age of 45. His home town of Fontaine-le-Bourg contains a memorial plaque celebrating the first journey using an internal combustion engine, and a street in the city of Rouen is named for him.
