= Canton of Bois-Guillaume =

Coordinates: 49°28′19″N 1°07′22″E

Bois-Guillaume
- Canton for the Departmental Council of Seine-Maritime
- Situation of the canton of Bois-Guillaume in the department
- Department: Seine-Maritime
- Population: 45,998 (2022)
- Electorate: 34,925 (2024)
- Major settlements: Bois-Guillaume

Current Canton
- Created: 2015
- Members: Nathalie Lecordier (DVD); Pascal Martin (MR)
- Seats: Two

The canton of Bois-Guillaume is an electoral district of the Seine-Maritime department, in northern France. It elects two departmental councillors sitting in the Departmental Council of Seine-Maritime. It covers northern suburbs of Rouen, including the town of Bois-Guillaume, and the rural area north of Rouen.

== Composition ==
At the French canton reorganisation which came into effect in March 2015, the canton was expanded from 3 to 19 communes:

- Anceaumeville
- Authieux-Ratiéville
- Bihorel
- Le Bocasse
- Bois-Guillaume
- Bosc-Guérard-Saint-Adrien
- Claville-Motteville
- Clères
- Esteville
- Fontaine-le-Bourg
- Frichemesnil
- Grugny
- La Houssaye-Béranger
- Isneauville
- Mont-Cauvaire
- Montville
- Quincampoix
- Saint-Georges-sur-Fontaine
- Sierville

== Population ==
Historical population
Year	Pop.	±% p.a.
2013	42,630	—
2018	44,952	+1.07%
2022	45,998	+0.58%
Source: INSEE

== Councillors ==
Election	Member	Party	Elected offices
2015	Nathalie Lecordier	DVD	Deputy mayor of Bihorel
2015	Pascal Martin	UDI	Incumbent councillor of the canton of Clères since 2011; President of the Departmental Council of Seine-Maritime until 2019; Former mayor of Monville; Senator for Seine-Maritime since 2019
2021	Nathalie Lecordier	DVD	Incumbent departmental councillor
2021	Pascal Martin	MR	Incumbent departmental councillor Senator for Seine-Maritime

== Election results ==
=== 2021 ===
Pairs	Party	Nuance	First round		Second round	
Pairs	Party	Nuance	Votes	%	Votes	%
Nathalie Lecordier	DVD	UCD	6,896	56.32	8,181	68.44
Pascal Martin	MR	UCD	6,896	56.32	8,181	68.44
Philippe Sauvajon	ECO	UGE	3,488	28.49	3,773	31.56
Mélanie Vauchel	DVG	UGE	3,488	28.49	3,773	31.56
Solange Coicault	RN	RN	1,861	15.20		
Frédéric Mazier	RN	RN	1,861	15.20		
Votes			12,245	100.00	11,954	100.00
Valid votes			12,245	96.42	11,954	95.02
Blank votes			331	2.61	470	3.74
Null votes			123	0.97	156	1.24
Turnout			12,699	37.48	12,580	37.13
Abstentions			21,179	62.52	21,301	62.87
Registered voters			33,878		33,881	
Result			DVD HOLD			
Result			MR HOLD			

=== 2015 ===
Pairs	Party	Nuance	First round	
Pairs	Party	Nuance	Votes	%
Nathalie Lecordier	DVD	UD	8,811	50.21
Pascal Martin	UDI	UD	8,811	50.21
Marie-Hélène Buchon	PS	UG	3,495	19.92
Thomas Cellier	PS	UG	3,495	19.92
Christelle Choux	FN	FN	3,490	19.89
Thierry Le Gueut	FN	FN	3,490	19.89
Annick Bonneau	EELV	VEC	1,752	9.98
Philippe Sauvajon	FG	VEC	1,752	9.98
Votes			17,548	100.00
Valid votes			17,548	96.68
Blank votes			451	2.48
Null votes			152	0.84
Turnout			18,151	53.16
Abstentions			15,991	46.84
Registered voters			34,142	
Result			DVD WIN (new seat)	
Result			UDI WIN (new seat)	

== See also ==
- Arrondissements of the Seine-Maritime department
- Cantons of the Seine-Maritime department
- Communes of the Seine-Maritime department
