= Mont-Cauvaire =

- Commune
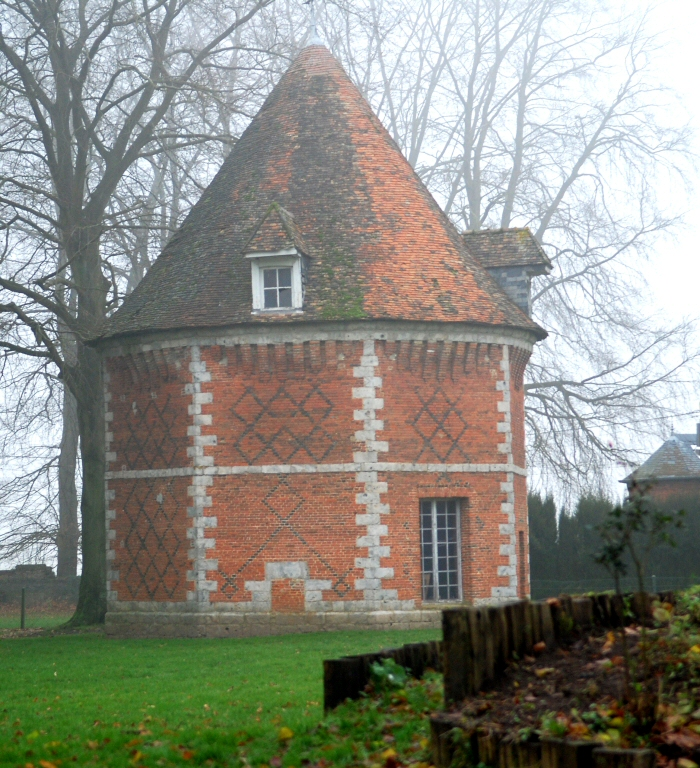
- The dovecote of the Domaine du Fossé

- Coat of arms
- Location of Mont-Cauvaire
- Location within France Location within Normandy
- Coordinates: 49°34′18″N 1°06′38″E
- Country: France
- Region: Normandy
- Department: Seine-Maritime
- Arrondissement: Rouen
- Canton: Bois-Guillaume

Government
  - Mayor (2026–32): Stéphanie Lambard
- Area^{1}: 9.02 km^{2} (3.48 sq mi)
- Elevation: 175 m (574 ft)
- Highest elevation: 176 m (577 ft)
- Lowest elevation: 65 m (213 ft)
- Population (2023): 898
  - Density: 99.6/km^{2} (258/sq mi)
- Time zone: UTC+01:00 (CET)
  - Summer (DST): UTC+02:00 (CEST)
- INSEE/Postal code: 76443 /76690
- ^{1} French Land Register data, which excludes lakes, ponds, glaciers > 1 km^{2} (0.386 sq mi or 247 acres) and river estuaries.

Mont-Cauvaire (French pronunciation: [mɔ̃ kovɛʁ]) is a commune in the Seine-Maritime department in the Normandy region in northern France.

== Geography ==
A farming village, situated along the banks of the river Cailly in the Pays de Caux, some 10 miles (16 km) north of Rouen on the D3 road.

== Heraldry ==
Arms of Mont-Cauvaire	The arms of Mont-Cauvaire are blazoned : Gules, 2 fesses wavy abased, with a triple-peaked mount argent over them, in chief a leopard Or armed sable, langued gules, holding a latin cross bendwise sable.

== Population ==
Historical population
Year	Pop.	±% p.a.
1968	451	—
1975	471	+0.62%
1982	557	+2.42%
1990	603	+1.00%
1999	566	−0.70%
2007	611	+0.96%
2012	627	+0.52%
2017	741	+3.40%
2023	898	+3.25%
Source: INSEE

== Places of interest ==
- The church of St.Martin, dating from the nineteenth century.
- A sixteenth century sandstone cross.
- The seventeenth century Château du Rombosc, with its chapel, and parkland.
- The Château du Fossé, dating from the seventeenth century.
- The eighteenth century Pavillon de La Tourelle and its parkland.
- Two dovecotes and a communal oven.

== See also ==
- Communes of the Seine-Maritime department
