= Grégory Tafforeau =

French footballer (born 1976)

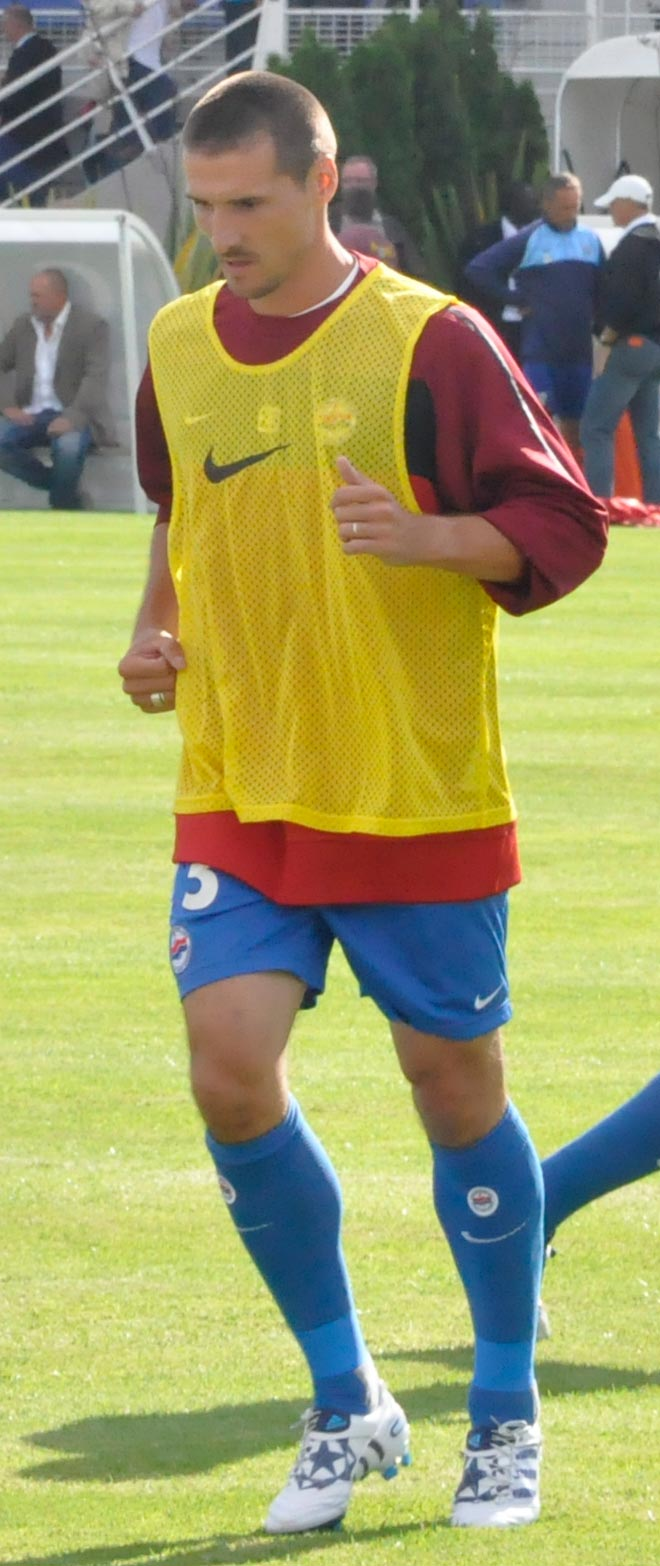
- Tafforeau in 2010

Personal information
- Date of birth: 29 September 1976 (age 50)
- Place of birth: Bois-Guillaume, France
- Height: 1.75 m (5 ft 9 in)
- Position: Defender

Youth career
- 1994–1995: Rouen
- 1995–1998: Caen

Senior career*
Years	Team	Apps	(Gls)
1998–2001	Caen	88	(1)
2001–2009	Lille	227	(1)
2009–2011	Caen	41	(0)
Total		356	(2)
- * Club domestic league appearances and goals

Grégory Tafforeau (born 29 September 1976) is a French former professional footballer who played as a defender.

== Career ==
After eight years at Lille OSC, Tafforeau, along with club officials, chose to prematurely terminate his contract. On 4 July 2009, the left-back signed for Stade Malherbe Caen on a free transfer having previously played for Caen from 1998 to 2001.

== Honours ==
Lille

- UEFA Intertoto Cup: 2004
