= Hôtel de Ville, Bois-Guillaume =

Town hall in Bois-Guillaume, France

Hôtel de Ville
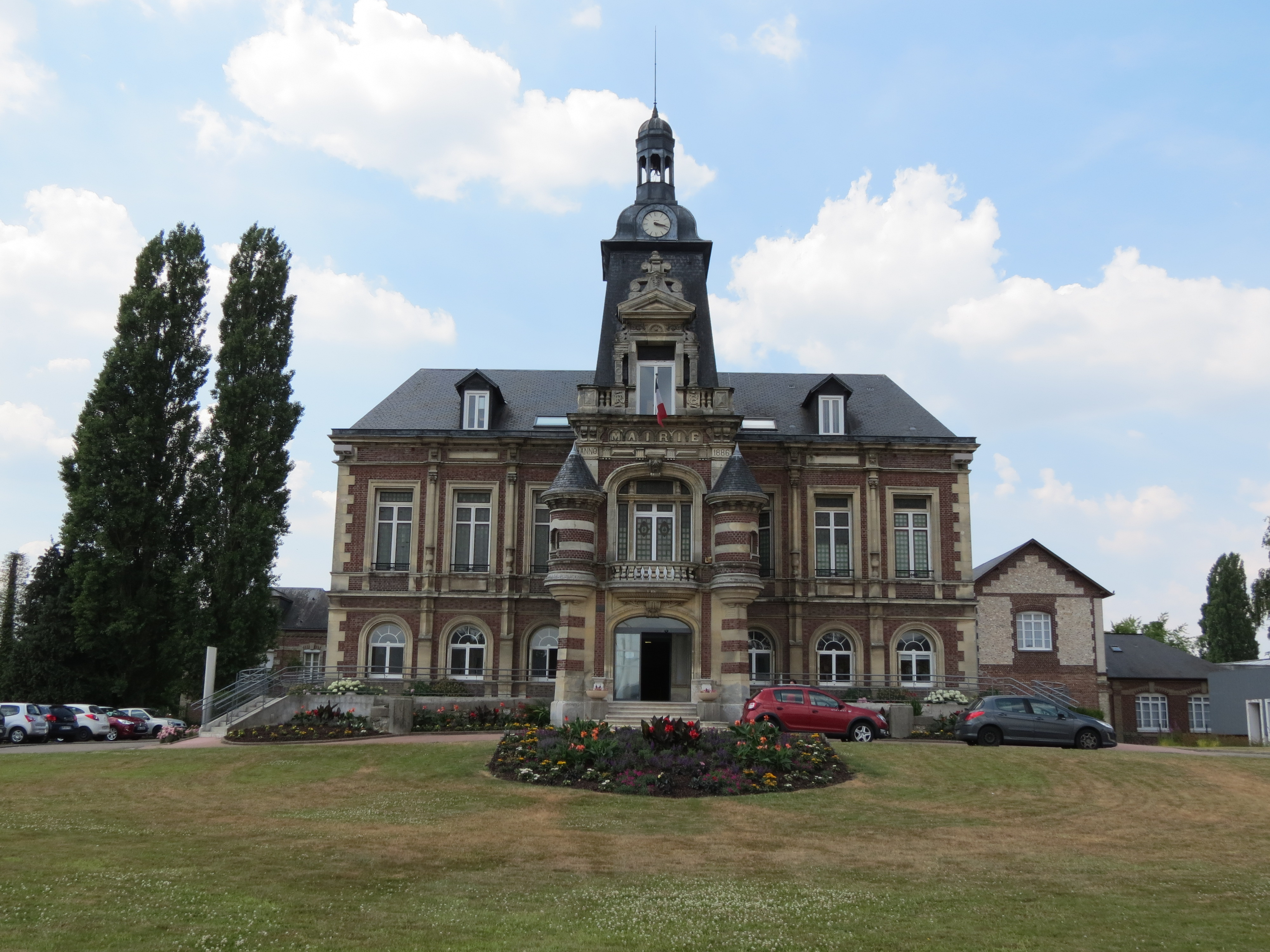
- The main frontage of the Hôtel de Ville in July 2018

General information
- Type: City hall
- Architectural style: Eclectic style
- Location: Bois-Guillaume, France
- Coordinates: 49.4703°N 1.1195°E
- Completed: 1887

Design and construction
- Architect: Louis Loisel

The Hôtel de Ville (French pronunciation: [otɛl də vil], City Hall) is a municipal building in Bois-Guillaume, Seine-Maritime, in northern France, standing on Place de la Libération.

== History ==
Following the French Revolution, the town council initially met in home of the mayor at the time. This arrangement continued until the mid-19th century, when the council decided to establish a Maison Communal (communal house) on the west side of Route de Neufchâtel. In the early 1880s, the council led by the mayor, Alexandre Girot, decided to commission a more substantial building. The site they selected was some 350 metres (1,150 ft) southwest along the Route de Neufchâtel from the Maison Communal. The new building was designed by Louis Loisel in the eclectic style, built in red brick with stone finishings and was officially opened on 16 October 1887.

The design involved a symmetrical main frontage of seven bays facing towards Route de Neufchâtel. The central bay, which was projected forward, featured a segmental-headed doorway with a moulded surround and a keystone on the ground floor, a segmental-headed window with a moulded surround, a keystone and a curved balcony on the first floor, and an ornate window in the form of an aedicula at attic level. Behind the attic window, there was a steep roof with a clock surmounted by an octagonal lantern. The central bay was flanked by bartizans at first floor level. The outer bays were fenestrated by round-headed windows on the ground floor and by square-headed windows with moulded surrounds on the first floor. Internally, the principal room was the Salle du Conseil (council chamber).

As the town was being liberated by troops of the 9th Canadian Infantry Brigade on 30 August 1944, part of the Second World War, two members of the French Resistance, Lucien Delarue André and Pierre Henri Leroy, were shot in front of the town hall by retreating German troops. On the following day, collaborators were arrested, paraded in front of the town hall and punished.

The building briefly served as the town hall of the combined commune of Bois-Guillaume-Bihorel from its formation in January 2012 until the two communes separated again in January 2014. In July 2021, urgent remedial work was carried out after the two bartizans were found to be in danger of collapse.
