= Claville-Motteville =

- Commune
- Coat of arms
- Location of Claville-Motteville
- Location within France Location within Normandy
- Coordinates: 49°36′01″N 1°11′27″E
- Country: France
- Region: Normandy
- Department: Seine-Maritime
- Arrondissement: Rouen
- Canton: Bois-Guillaume

Government
  - Mayor (2026–32): François-Régis du Mesnil
- Area^{1}: 9.26 km^{2} (3.58 sq mi)
- Elevation: 150 m (490 ft)
- Highest elevation: 174 m (571 ft)
- Lowest elevation: 97 m (318 ft)
- Population (2023): 260
  - Density: 28/km^{2} (73/sq mi)
- Time zone: UTC+01:00 (CET)
  - Summer (DST): UTC+02:00 (CEST)
- INSEE/Postal code: 76177 /76690
- ^{1} French Land Register data, which excludes lakes, ponds, glaciers > 1 km^{2} (0.386 sq mi or 247 acres) and river estuaries.

Claville-Motteville (French pronunciation: [klavil mɔtvil]) is a commune in the Seine-Maritime department in the Normandy region in northern France.

== Geography ==
A farming village situated by the banks of the Cailly, in the Pays de Caux, some 16 miles (26 km) northeast of Rouen, at the junction of the D151 and the D6 roads.

== Population ==
Historical population
Year	Pop.	±% p.a.
1968	251	—
1975	207	−2.72%
1982	268	+3.76%
1990	243	−1.22%
1999	233	−0.47%
2007	249	+0.83%
2012	285	+2.74%
2017	279	−0.42%
2023	260	−1.17%
Source: INSEE

== Places of interest ==
- The church of Sts. Martin &Marguerite, dating from the sixteenth century.
- A thirteenth century baptistery.
- A sixteenth century sandstone cross.

== See also ==
- Communes of the Seine-Maritime department
