= Isneauville =

- Commune
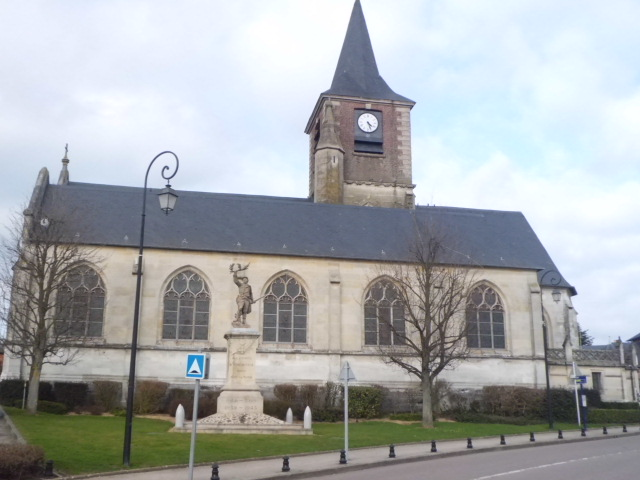
- The church in Isneauville
- Location of Isneauville
- Location within France Location within Normandy
- Coordinates: 49°29′58″N 1°08′36″E
- Country: France
- Region: Normandy
- Department: Seine-Maritime
- Arrondissement: Rouen
- Canton: Bois-Guillaume
- Intercommunality: Métropole Rouen Normandie

Government
  - Mayor (2022–2026): Sylvie Laroche
- Area^{1}: 8.2 km^{2} (3.2 sq mi)
- Elevation: 100 m (330 ft)
- Highest elevation: 172 m (564 ft)
- Lowest elevation: 100 m (330 ft)
- Population (2023): 3,716
  - Density: 450/km^{2} (1,200/sq mi)
- Time zone: UTC+01:00 (CET)
  - Summer (DST): UTC+02:00 (CEST)
- INSEE/Postal code: 76377 /76230
- ^{1} French Land Register data, which excludes lakes, ponds, glaciers > 1 km^{2} (0.386 sq mi or 247 acres) and river estuaries.

Isneauville (French pronunciation: [isnovil]) is a commune in the Seine-Maritime department in the Normandy region in northern France.

== Geography ==
A small light industrial and farming town, situated some 8 miles (13 km) northeast of Rouen, at the junction of the D928, D47, D61 and the D151 roads. The A28 autoroute forms the south-eastern border of the commune.

== Population ==
Historical population
Year	Pop.	±% p.a.
1968	843	—
1975	1,214	+5.35%
1982	1,403	+2.09%
1990	2,210	+5.84%
1999	2,324	+0.56%
2007	2,439	+0.61%
2012	2,574	+1.08%
2017	3,158	+4.17%
2023	3,716	+2.75%
Source: INSEE

== Places of interest ==
- The church of St. Germain, dating from the thirteenth century.
- An ancient dovecote.
- The sixteenth century Château des Cinq Bonnets.

== See also ==
- Communes of the Seine-Maritime department
