= Saint-Georges-sur-Fontaine =

- Commune
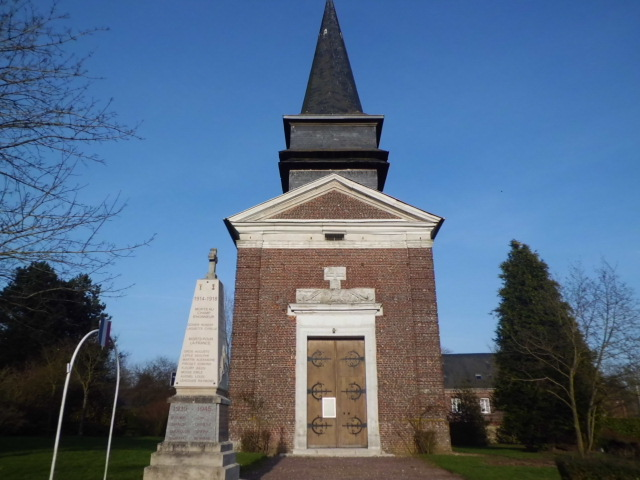
- The church in Saint-Georges-sur-Fontaine
- Location of Saint-Georges-sur-Fontaine
- Location within France Location within Normandy
- Coordinates: 49°32′39″N 1°10′50″E
- Country: France
- Region: Normandy
- Department: Seine-Maritime
- Arrondissement: Rouen
- Canton: Bois-Guillaume

Government
  - Mayor (2026–32): Gaël Fouldrin
- Area^{1}: 9.09 km^{2} (3.51 sq mi)
- Elevation: 160 m (520 ft)
- Highest elevation: 174 m (571 ft)
- Lowest elevation: 95 m (312 ft)
- Population (2023): 950
  - Density: 100/km^{2} (270/sq mi)
- Time zone: UTC+01:00 (CET)
  - Summer (DST): UTC+02:00 (CEST)
- INSEE/Postal code: 76580 /76690
- ^{1} French Land Register data, which excludes lakes, ponds, glaciers > 1 km^{2} (0.386 sq mi or 247 acres) and river estuaries.

Saint-Georges-sur-Fontaine (French pronunciation: [sɛ̃ ʒɔʁʒ syʁ fɔ̃tɛn], literally Saint-Georges on Fontaine) is a commune in the Seine-Maritime department in the Normandy region in northern France.

== Geography ==
A village of farming and forestry situated in the Pays de Caux, some 9 miles (14 km) northeast of Rouen at the junction of the D53 and the D87 roads.

== Population ==
Historical population
Year	Pop.	±% p.a.
1968	492	—
1975	590	+2.63%
1982	596	+0.14%
1990	675	+1.57%
1999	761	+1.34%
2007	840	+1.24%
2012	905	+1.50%
2017	911	+0.13%
2023	950	+0.70%
Source: INSEE

== Places of interest ==
- The church of St. Georges, with vaulted ceilings dating from the sixteenth century.
- Two manorhouses, at the hamlets of Le Varat and Coquereaumont.
- A seventeenth century chapel.

== See also ==
- Communes of the Seine-Maritime department
