= Departmental Council of Seine-Maritime =

Departmental legislature in France

Type
- Type: Departmental council

Leadership
- President: Bertrand Bellanger, RE since 16 October 2019

Structure
- Seats: 70
- Political groups: Government (34): DVD (15) (Note: DVD (12); Horizons (3)); LR (10); UDI (5) (Note: UDI (4); LC (1)); DVG (2); MR (1); RE (1); Opposition (34): PS (21); PCF (8); DVG (3); LÉ (2); Other (2): DVG (2)

Elections
- Voting system: Two-round party block voting system
- Last election: 20 and 27 June 2021
- Next election: 2028 French departmental elections

Meeting place
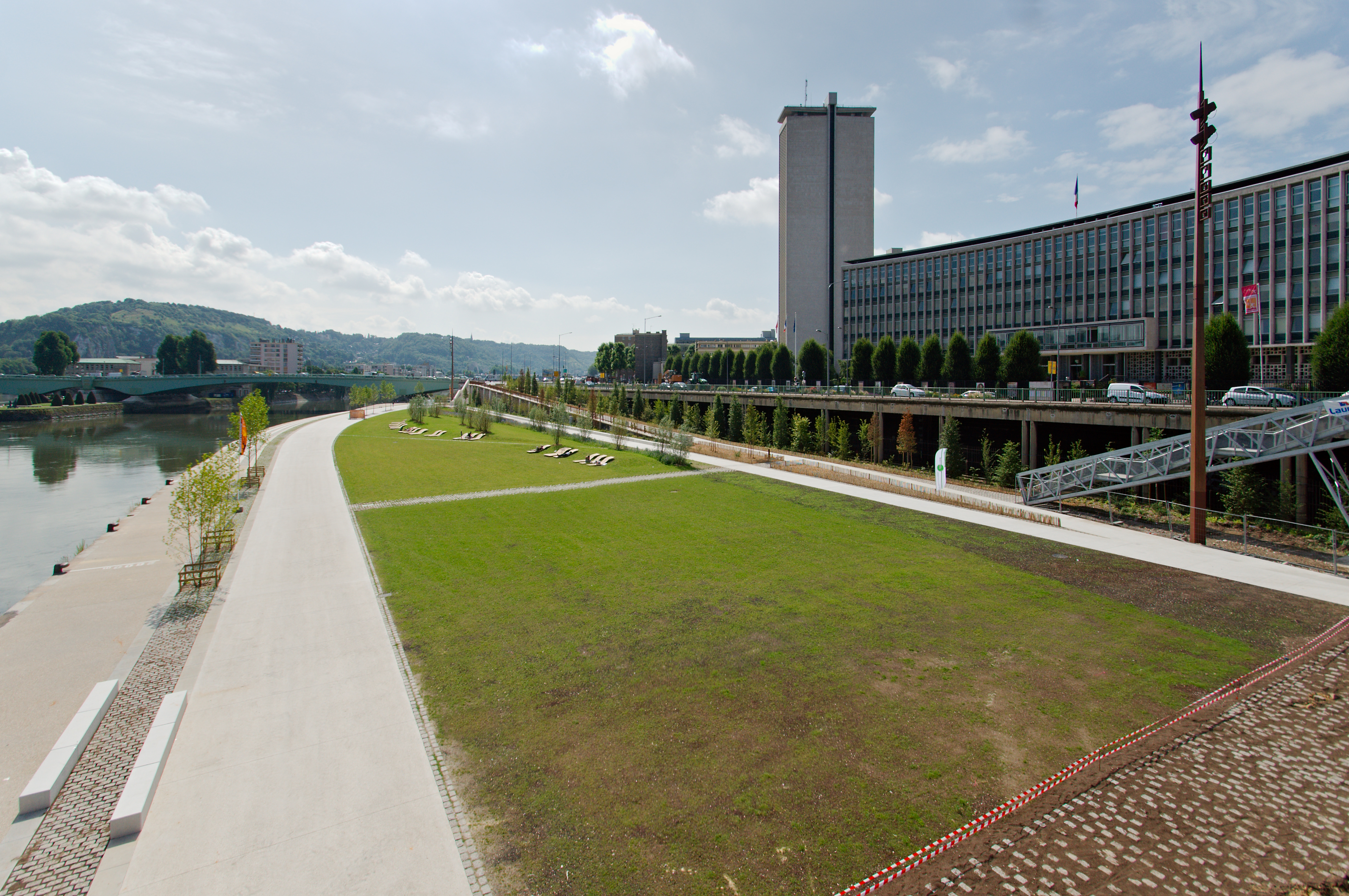
- Departement Hotel, Rouen

The Departmental Council of Seine-Maritime (French: Conseil départemental de la Seine-Maritime) is the deliberative assembly of the Seine-Maritime department in the region of Normandy. It consists of 70 members (departmental councilors) from 35 cantons and its headquarters are in Rouen.

The President of the Departmental Council is Bertrand Bellanger.

== Vice-Presidents ==
The President of the Departmental Council is assisted by 15 vice-presidents chosen from among the departmental advisers. Each of them has a delegation of authority.

List of vice-presidents of the Seine-Maritime Departmental Council (as of 2021)
| Order | Name | Party | Canton (constituency) | In charge of |
|---|---|---|---|---|
| 1st | Florence Thibaudeau-Rainot | DVD | Le Havre-1 | Human solidarity |
| 2nd | André Gautier | UD | Dieppe-1 | Habitation, housing and city policy |
| 3rd | Nathalie Lecordier | UCD | Bois-Guillaume | Children, families, health and equal rights. |
| 4th | Alain Bazille | DVD | Fécamp | Infrastructures, ports and coastline |
| 5th | Virginie Lucot Avril | UCD | Gournay-en-Bray | Digital development of territories |
| 6th | Nicolas Bertrand | DVD | Neufchâtel-en-Bray | Arrondissement of Dieppe |
| 7th | Cécile Sineau-Patry | UCD | Saint-Valery-en-Caux | Ecological transition, rurality, agriculture and food |
| 8th | Laurent Grelaud | DVG | Darnétal | Finance, human resources and public policy evaluation |
| 9th | Chantal Cottereau | UCD | Luneray | Colleges and educational success |
| 10th | Julien Demazure | UD | Le Mesnil-Esnard | Arrondissement of Rouen |
| 11th | Claire Guéroult | DVC | Saint-Romain-de Colbosc | Regional development, tourism and attractiveness |
| 12th | Patrick Teissère | UCD | Le Havre-5 | Culture, public reading, heritage and decentralized cooperation |
| 13th | Florence Durande | DVD | Octeville-sur-Mer | Public procurement |
| 14th | Florent Saint-Martin | DVD | Le Havre-6 | Arrondissement of Le Havre |
| 15th | Séverine Gest | DVD | Yvetot | Youth and sports |
