= Bihorel =

- Commune
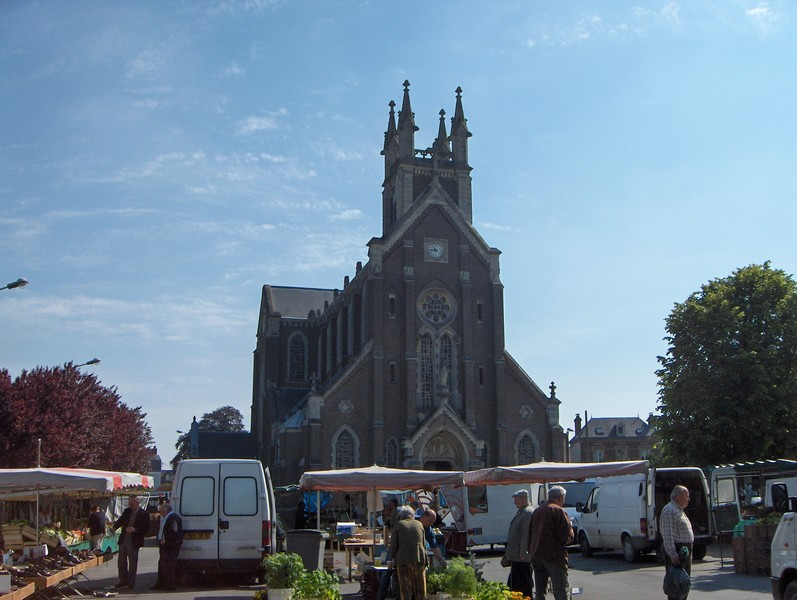
- Notre Dame des Anges Church and market in Bihorel

- Coat of arms
- Location of Bihorel
- Location within France Location within Normandy
- Coordinates: 49°27′19″N 1°07′01″E
- Country: France
- Region: Normandy
- Department: Seine-Maritime
- Arrondissement: Rouen
- Canton: Bois-Guillaume
- Intercommunality: Métropole Rouen Normandie

Government
  - Mayor (2020–2026): Pascal Houbron
- Area^{1}: 2.51 km^{2} (0.97 sq mi)
- Elevation: 157 m (515 ft)
- Highest elevation: 167 m (548 ft)
- Lowest elevation: 80 m (260 ft)
- Population (2023): 8,316
  - Density: 3,310/km^{2} (8,580/sq mi)
- Time zone: UTC+01:00 (CET)
  - Summer (DST): UTC+02:00 (CEST)
- INSEE/Postal code: 76095 /76420
- ^{1} French Land Register data, which excludes lakes, ponds, glaciers > 1 km^{2} (0.386 sq mi or 247 acres) and river estuaries.

Bihorel (French pronunciation: [biɔʁɛl]) is a commune of the Seine-Maritime department in the Normandy region in northern France. It is a northeastern suburb of Rouen.

== Geography ==
=== Situation ===
Bihorel is a suburban and light industrial town forming part of the agglomeration of Rouen. Located on the northern plateau of Rouen, Bihorel is a town with three districts:

- Vieux Bihorel: attached to Rouen, halfway up the slope;
- plateau des Provinces : the neighborhood of collective buildings behind old Bihorel;
- le Chapitre: the residential neighborhood further north.

=== Roads and transportation ===
Bihorel is situated at the junction of the D243 and the D443 roads. The T2 line (TEOR) permits to reach the city center of Rouen in 30 minutes from the south of Bihorel. The F2, 40 and 20 lines make possible to go to the city center of Rouen in 10 minutes.

== Heraldry ==
Arms of Bihorel	The arms of Bihorel are blazoned : Gules, a bend sinister between in chief a beehive and in base 2 leopards Or, and on a chief azure a knight contourny between an archer contourny and 2 soccer players contourny the sinister one with a ball at his foot, Or.

== History ==
The town was created on April 13, 1892. Previously, Bihorel was a district of Bois-Guillaume.

On 4 July 2011, the merger of Bihorel and Bois-Guillaume was voted in the municipal councils, a merger that was effective from January 1, 2012, under the regime of the new communes, despite the consultation organized by the mayors of these two cities. There was a very large opposition from the population (66.43% opposed).

From January 1, 2012 to December 31, 2013, the commune was merged with its neighbor, Bois-Guillaume, as the commune nouvelle Bois-Guillaume-Bihorel. The creation of this commune was invalidated by the administrative court of Rouen, a decision neither the prefecture or the commune appealed. The two communes were recreated on 1 January 2014.

== Population ==
Historical population
Year	Pop.	±% p.a.
1968	7,009	—
1975	9,382	+4.25%
1982	10,121	+1.09%
1990	9,358	−0.97%
1999	9,057	−0.36%
2007	8,461	−0.85%
2012	8,268	−0.46%
2017	8,398	+0.31%
2023	8,316	−0.16%
Source: INSEE

== Places of interest ==
- The church of Notre-Dame, dating from the nineteenth century.
- A seventeenth century manor house.

== Notable people ==
- Jules Michelet (1798–1874) historian, stayed here many times.
- Charles Nicolle (1866–1936) scientist, had a house here.

== Twin towns ==
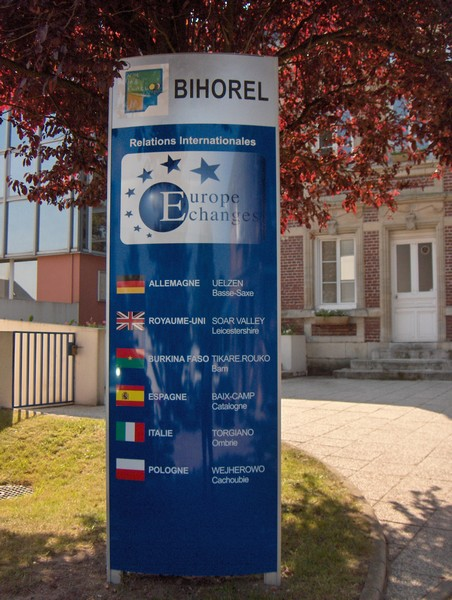

- Uelzen, Germany
- Soar Valley, England
- Baix Camp, Spain
- Torgiano, Italy
- Wejherowo, Poland

== See also ==
- Communes of the Seine-Maritime department
