= Clérette =

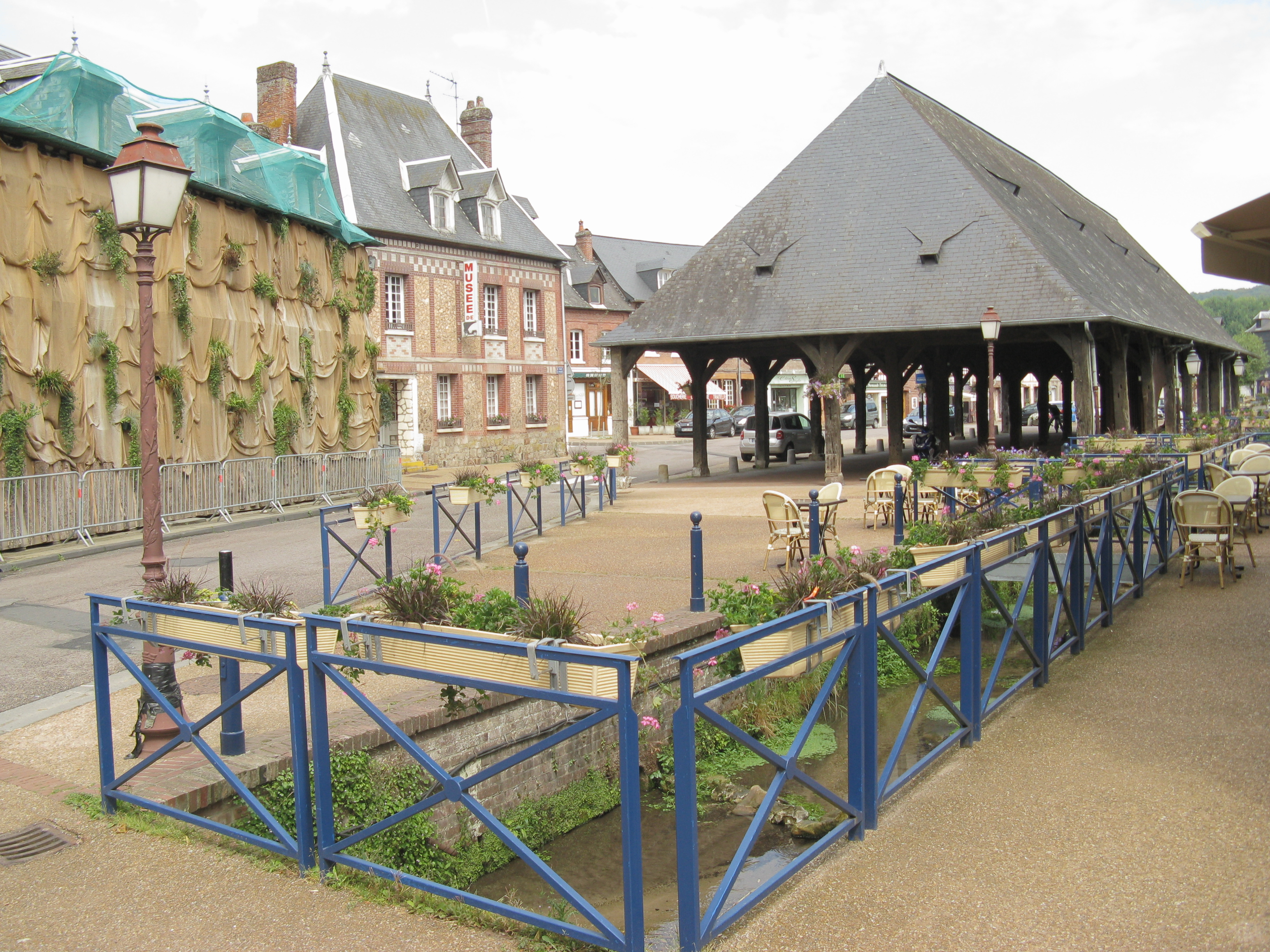
- The Clérette at Clères

- Location within France Location within Normandy

Location
- Country: France

Physical characteristics
- Source
  - location: Clères
  - elevation: 178 m (584 ft)
- Mouth
  - location: The Cailly at Montville
  - coordinates: 49°54′N 1°07′E
- Length: 10 km (6.2 mi)
- Basin size: 67 km^{2} (26 sq mi)
- Discharge
  - average: 0.63 m^{3}/s (22 cu ft/s)

Basin features
- Progression: Cailly→ Seine→ English Channel

The Clérette is a river of Normandy, France, 10 kilometres (6.2 mi) in length, flowing through the department of Seine-Maritime. It is a right tributary of the Cailly.

== Geography ==
The Clérette has its source in the northern part of the territory of the commune of Clères. Taking a southern route, it passes the hamlet of Le Tot then flows through the commune of Anceaumeville, meeting the Cailly at Montville.

== See also ==
- French water management scheme

== Bibliography ==
- Albert Hennetier, Aux sources normandes: Promenade au fil des rivières en Seine-Maritime, Ed. Bertout, Luneray, 2006 ISBN 2867436230
