= Notre-Dame-de-Bondeville =

- Commune
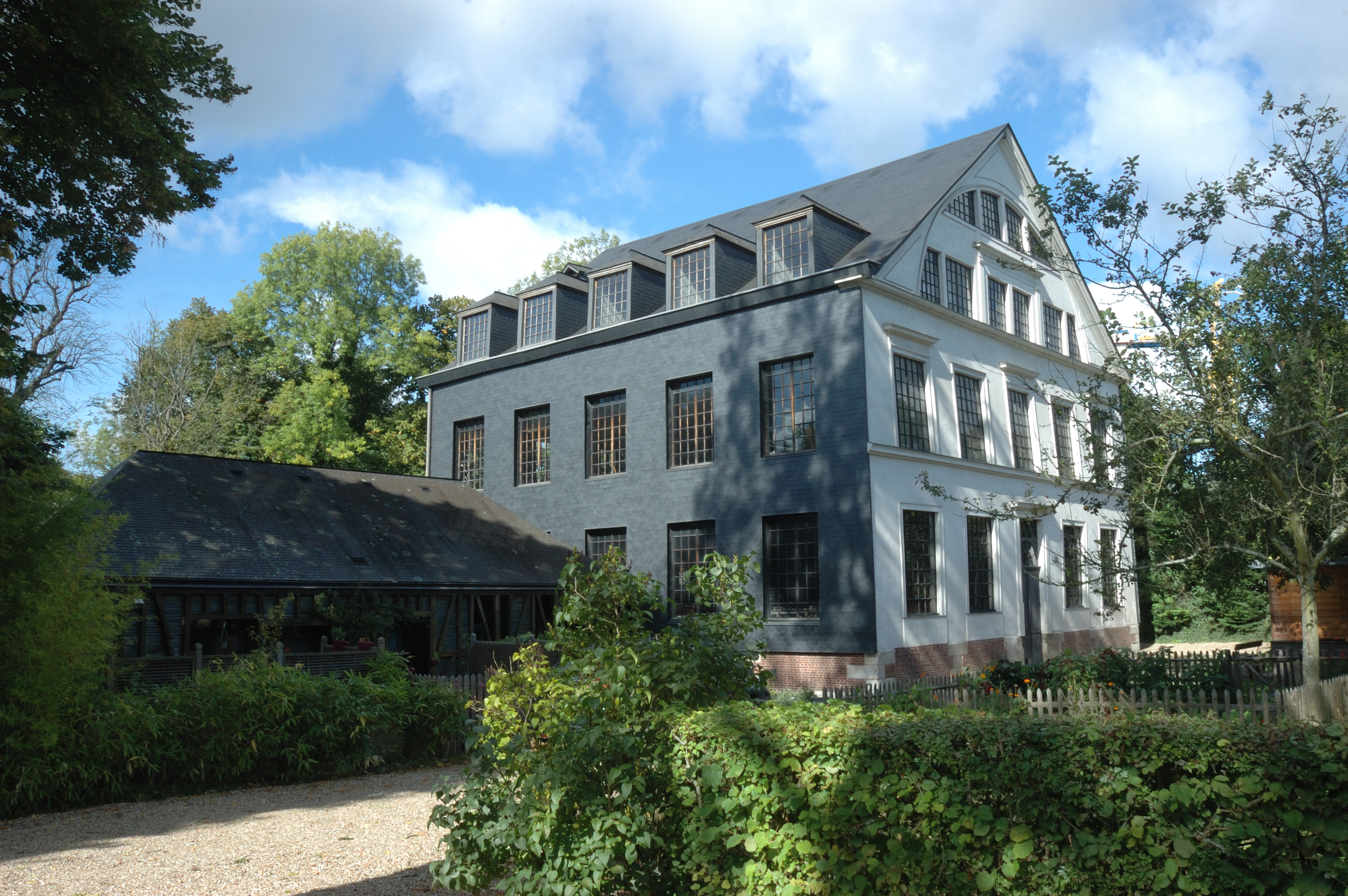
- The old cotton mill in Notre-Dame-de-Bondeville

- Coat of arms
- Location of Notre-Dame-de-Bondeville
- Location within France Location within Normandy
- Coordinates: 49°29′21″N 1°02′57″E
- Country: France
- Region: Normandy
- Department: Seine-Maritime
- Arrondissement: Rouen
- Canton: Notre-Dame-de-Bondeville
- Intercommunality: Métropole Rouen Normandie

Government
  - Mayor (2026–32): Alain Quibel
- Area^{1}: 6.28 km^{2} (2.42 sq mi)
- Elevation: 28 m (92 ft)
- Highest elevation: 157 m (515 ft)
- Lowest elevation: 19 m (62 ft)
- Population (2023): 7,071
  - Density: 1,130/km^{2} (2,920/sq mi)
- Time zone: UTC+01:00 (CET)
  - Summer (DST): UTC+02:00 (CEST)
- INSEE/Postal code: 76474 /76960
- ^{1} French Land Register data, which excludes lakes, ponds, glaciers > 1 km^{2} (0.386 sq mi or 247 acres) and river estuaries.

Notre-Dame-de-Bondeville (French pronunciation: [nɔtʁ dam də bɔ̃dvil]) is a commune in the Seine-Maritime department in the Normandy region in northern France.

== Geography ==
A suburban and light industrial town situated by the banks of the river Cailly, just 5 miles (8.0 km) northwest of Rouen at the junction of the D6015 and the D43 roads.

== Heraldry ==
| Arms of Notre-Dame-de-Bondeville | The arms of Notre-Dame-de-Bondeville are blazoned : Sable, on a bend chequy argent and gules of 3 traits, a plate [argent] (the width of the bend) charged with a crowned lion vert. |

== Population ==
Historical population
| Year | Pop. | ±% p.a. |
|---|---|---|
| 1968 | 5,796 | — |
| 1975 | 6,336 | +1.28% |
| 1982 | 6,727 | +0.86% |
| 1990 | 7,584 | +1.51% |
| 1999 | 7,652 | +0.10% |
| 2007 | 7,186 | −0.78% |
| 2012 | 6,983 | −0.57% |
| 2017 | 7,015 | +0.09% |
| 2023 | 7,071 | +0.13% |
Source: INSEE

== Places of interest ==
- The church of Notre-Dame, dating from the nineteenth century.
- The nineteenth century ropemaking factory, now a museum.
- Some thirteenth century ecclesiastical buildings.

== See also ==
- Communes of the Seine-Maritime department
