= Cleres Zoological Park =

- Interactive map of Cleres Zoological Park
- 49°35′49″N 1°6′28″E
- Location: Clères, France
- Land area: 13 ha (32 acres)
- No. of animals: 1,700
- Memberships: EAZA
- Website: www.parcdecleres.net

Cleres Zoological Park (Parc Zoologique De Clères) is located in Clères, 22 kilometres (14 mi) north of Rouen, France. This zoological park is on the grounds of a 14th-century château and includes 200 mammals and 1,500 birds in a wooded area of 13 hectares (32 acres). The park is only open to visitors between February and October.
