= Bois-Guillaume =

- Commune
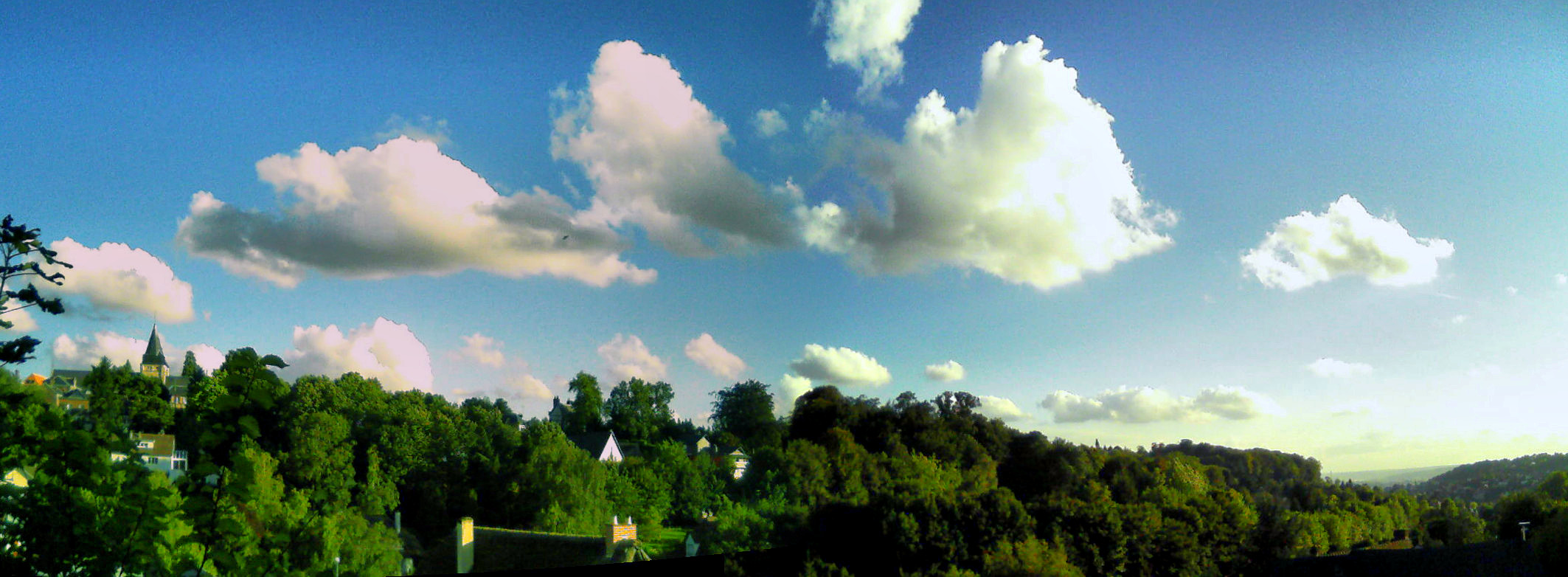
- A general view of Bois-Guillaume

- Coat of arms
- Location of Bois-Guillaume
- Location within France Location within Normandy
- Coordinates: 49°27′41″N 1°06′33″E
- Country: France
- Region: Normandy
- Department: Seine-Maritime
- Arrondissement: Rouen
- Canton: Bois-Guillaume
- Intercommunality: Métropole Rouen Normandie

Government
  - Mayor (2026–32): Théo Pérez
- Area^{1}: 8.85 km^{2} (3.42 sq mi)
- Elevation: 167 m (548 ft)
- Highest elevation: 171 m (561 ft)
- Lowest elevation: 52 m (171 ft)
- Population (2023): 14,539
  - Density: 1,640/km^{2} (4,250/sq mi)
- Time zone: UTC+01:00 (CET)
  - Summer (DST): UTC+02:00 (CEST)
- INSEE/Postal code: 76108 /76230
- ^{1} French Land Register data, which excludes lakes, ponds, glaciers > 1 km^{2} (0.386 sq mi or 247 acres) and river estuaries.

Bois-Guillaume (French pronunciation: [bwa ɡijom]) is a commune in the Seine-Maritime department in the Normandy region in northern France.

== Geography ==
The town is a wealthy, residential hilltop suburb of Rouen, semi-rural, semi-suburban with a little farming and some light industry. It is considered part of Greater Rouen, being just five kilometres (3 mi) to the northeast, at the junction of the D43 and the D928 roads.

== History ==
Bois-Guillaume was originally a Gallo-Roman settlement of which few traces remain. Local legend claims that in 1040 William the Conqueror's mother built a country house on the hill and the area thus came to be known variously as Boscum Guillelmi or Bosco Willelmi, later becoming Bois-Guillaume. There is, however, no serious evidence of any link to William the Conqueror; this derivation of the town's name is therefore in all likelihood a folk etymology.

By the late 19th century, nearby Rouen had expanded to such an extent that parts of Bois-Guillaume had become urbanized. This led to tensions between the urban neighborhoods closest to Rouen (such as Bihorel) and the rest of the commune, which had remained more rural. The situation came to a head in 1892, when Bihorel split from Bois-Guillaume and became a commune in its own right. As a result of the split, the commune of Bois-Guillaume saw its territory reduced by 22% and its population reduced by 38%.

In 2010, the municipal councils of Bois-Guillaume and Bihorel began to cooperate more closely, with a view to merging in order to become a single commune once again. In July 2011, despite opposition among residents of both communes, the merger was approved by the two municipal councils and ratified by prefectoral order on 29 August 2011. The new commune of Bois-Guillaume-Bihorel came into being on 1 January 2012. Following an appeal, however, the prefectoral order was repealed on 18 June 2013, and the new commune was disbanded on 31 December 2013; on 1 January 2014, the two former communes of Bois-Guillaume and Bihorel were reinstated.

== Activities ==
Bois-Guillaume is well known for its tranquility. No bars are open at night-time; people tend to go out in Rouen (city center). Bois-Guillaume's leisure amenities include several parks (Parc Anderson, Parc des Cosmonautes, and a dedicated play area called La Plaine de Jeux des Portes de la Forêt), a forest area (La Forêt Verte), and two cycle routes that pass through the town (Cailly–Robec and Plaine de la Ronce). There are also a number of soccer pitches (in particular in the Parc des Cosmonautes), which are available for use by local schools and sports clubs.

== Heraldry ==
Arms of Bois-Guillaume	The arms of Bois-Guillaume are blazoned: Per pale azure and gules, a garb, and in pale 2 lions Or. The line of division is fimbriated Or.

== Population ==
Historical population
Year	Pop.	±% p.a.
1968	8,782	—
1975	9,590	+1.27%
1982	9,323	−0.40%
1990	10,159	+1.08%
1999	11,968	+1.84%
2007	13,070	+1.11%
2012	12,847	−0.34%
2017	13,796	+1.44%
2023	14,539	+0.88%
Source: INSEE

== Places of interest ==
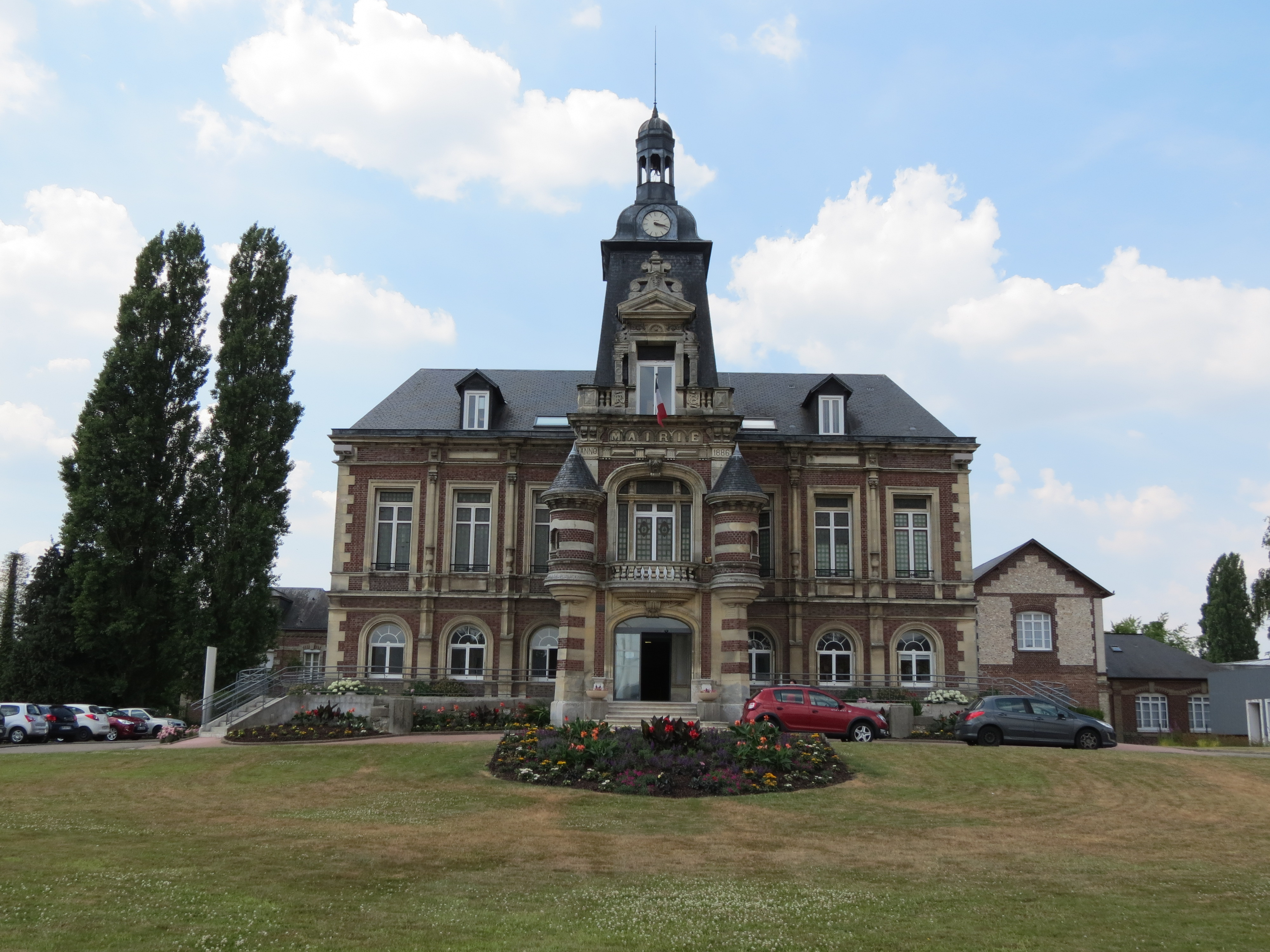
The Hôtel de Ville

- The church of the Trinity, dating from the fifteenth century.
- The church of Notre-Dame, dating from the nineteenth century.
- The Château des Cinq-Bonnets.
- A Carmelite monastery.
- The Hôtel de Ville, completed in 1887

== Health ==
There are different hospitals and clinics in Bois-Guillaume.

The Bois-Guillaume hospital is one of the facilities of the Rouen University Hospital Center.

There are also the Cedar Clinic, St. Anthony Clinic and the French Red Cross, with Bois-Guillaume Hospital and Training Institute.

== Sports ==
The commune has a football club FUSC Bois-Guillaume, who are based at the Parc des Cosmonautes.

In addition Bois-Guillaume has several other sporting clubs such as several riding clubs, a tennis club, volleyball, table tennis, judo, aikibudo and a golf training course.

== Notable people ==
- François Hollande, politician, former French President, born 1954
- Grégory Tafforeau, footballer, born 1976

== Twin towns ==
- Uelzen, Germany
- Torgiano, Italy
- Kegworth, England
- (Spain) Baix Camp, Espagne
- Rouko, Burkina Faso
- Tikare, Burkina Faso

== See also ==
- Communes of the Seine-Maritime department
