= Quincampoix =

- Commune
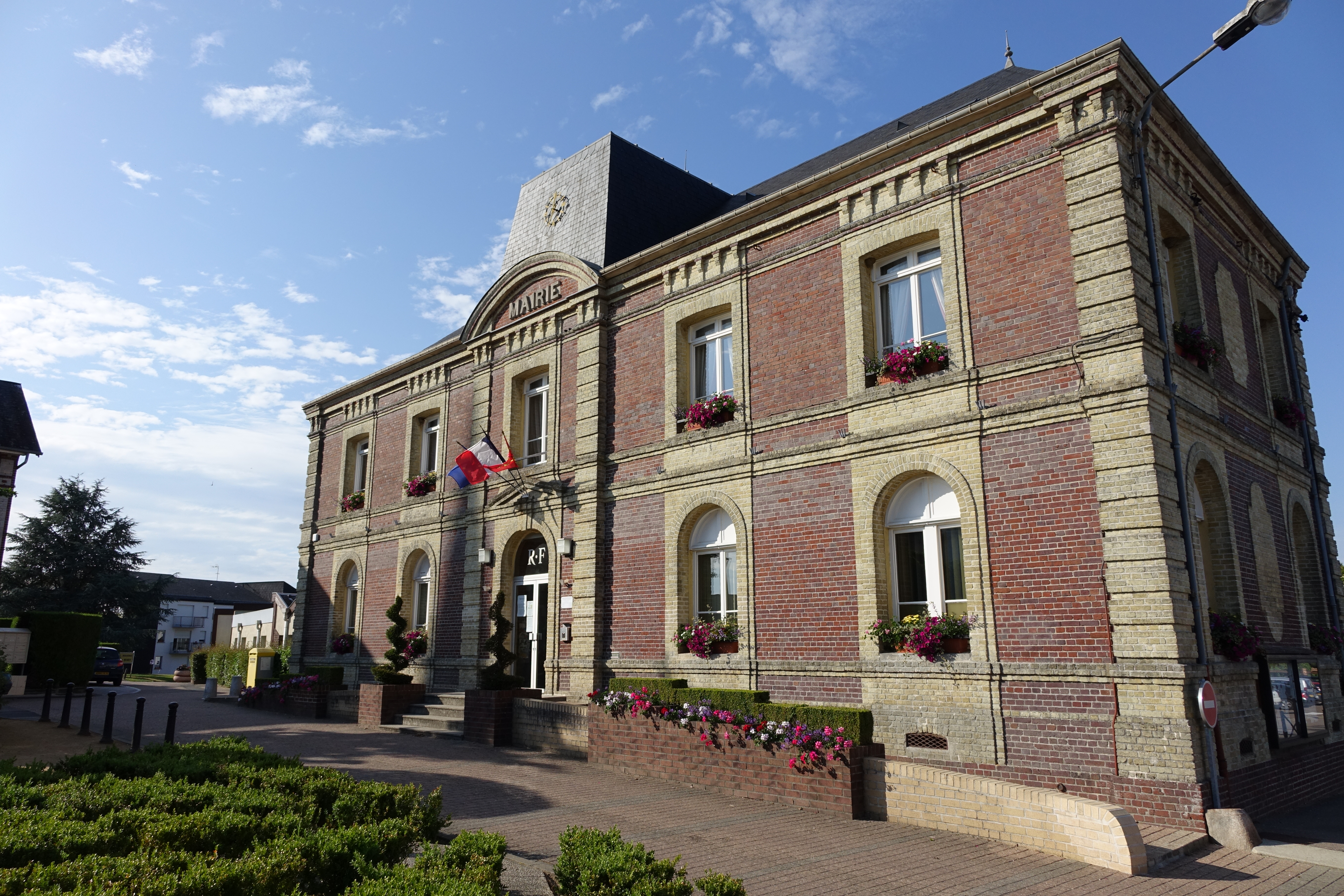
- The town hall in Quincampoix

- Coat of arms
- Location of Quincampoix
- Location within France Location within Normandy
- Coordinates: 49°31′31″N 1°11′07″E
- Country: France
- Region: Normandy
- Department: Seine-Maritime
- Arrondissement: Rouen
- Canton: Bois-Guillaume
- Intercommunality: Inter-Caux-Vexin

Government
  - Mayor (2026–32): Éric Herbet
- Area^{1}: 20.34 km^{2} (7.85 sq mi)
- Elevation: 166 m (545 ft)
- Highest elevation: 180 m (590 ft)
- Lowest elevation: 80 m (260 ft)
- Population (2023): 3,103
  - Density: 152.6/km^{2} (395.1/sq mi)
- Time zone: UTC+01:00 (CET)
  - Summer (DST): UTC+02:00 (CEST)
- INSEE/Postal code: 76517 /76230
- ^{1} French Land Register data, which excludes lakes, ponds, glaciers > 1 km^{2} (0.386 sq mi or 247 acres) and river estuaries.

Quincampoix (French pronunciation: [kɛ̃kɑ̃pwa]) is a commune in the Seine-Maritime department in the Normandy region in north-western France.

== Geography ==
A farming village situated some 6 miles (9.7 km) northeast of Rouen at the junction of the D 90, D 928 and the D 51 roads.

== Heraldry ==
Arms of Quincampoix	The arms of Quincampoix are blazoned : Per fess 1: Or, a chestnut tree vert issuant from the line of division and 2: Azure, a chevron between a mullet and a toothed wheel and, in saltire, a pitchfork and an ax Or. (created 1977)

== Population ==
Historical population

Year	Pop.	±% p.a.
1793	846	—
1800	890	+0.73%
1806	865	−0.47%
1821	924	+0.44%
1831	1,053	+1.32%
1836	1,020	−0.63%
1841	1,033	+0.25%
1846	1,070	+0.71%
1851	980	−1.74%
1856	978	−0.04%
1861	962	−0.33%
1866	1,135	+3.36%
1872	944	−3.02%
1876	926	−0.48%
1881	849	−1.72%
1886	886	+0.86%
1891	848	−0.87%
1896	810	−0.91%
1901	849	+0.94%

Year	Pop.	±% p.a.
1906	751	−2.42%
1911	802	+1.32%
1921	778	−0.30%
1926	821	+1.08%
1931	858	+0.89%
1936	855	−0.07%
1946	899	+0.50%
1954	948	+0.67%
1962	969	+0.27%
1968	1,022	+0.89%
1975	1,242	+2.82%
1982	1,676	+4.37%
1990	2,107	+2.90%
1999	2,690	+2.75%
2007	3,146	+1.98%
2012	2,994	−0.99%
2017	2,994	+0.00%
2023	3,103	+0.60%

Source: EHESS and INSEE (1968-2023)

== Places of interest ==
- The church of St. Marguerite, dating from the nineteenth century.
- A sixteenth-century stone cross in the cemetery.

== People ==
- It is the burial place of Jacques Anquetil (1934–1987) a road racing cyclist.

== See also ==
- Communes of the Seine-Maritime department
