= La Houssaye-Béranger =

- Commune
- Coat of arms
- Location of La Houssaye-Béranger
- Location within France Location within Normandy
- Coordinates: 49°37′54″N 1°05′11″E
- Country: France
- Region: Normandy
- Department: Seine-Maritime
- Arrondissement: Rouen
- Canton: Bois-Guillaume

Government
  - Mayor (2026–32): Jean-Marie Edde
- Area^{1}: 8.06 km^{2} (3.11 sq mi)
- Elevation: 169 m (554 ft)
- Highest elevation: 179 m (587 ft)
- Lowest elevation: 116 m (381 ft)
- Population (2023): 545
  - Density: 67.6/km^{2} (175/sq mi)
- Time zone: UTC+01:00 (CET)
  - Summer (DST): UTC+02:00 (CEST)
- INSEE/Postal code: 76369 /76690
- ^{1} French Land Register data, which excludes lakes, ponds, glaciers > 1 km^{2} (0.386 sq mi or 247 acres) and river estuaries.

La Houssaye-Béranger is a commune in the Seine-Maritime department in the Normandy region in northern France.

== Geography ==
A forestry and farming village situated in the Pays de Caux, some 16 miles (26 km) north of Rouen, at the junction of the D2, D90 and the D97 roads.

== Heraldry ==
Arms of La Houssaye-Béranger	The arms of La Houssaye-Béranger are blazoned : Azure, a chevron argent between 2 anchors and a cow passant Or, a chief per pale 1 Gules, a mitre Or, and 2 paly Or and gules.

== Population ==
Historical population
Year	Pop.	±% p.a.
1968	264	—
1975	260	−0.22%
1982	360	+4.76%
1990	427	+2.16%
1999	498	+1.72%
2007	533	+0.85%
2012	527	−0.23%
2017	534	+0.26%
2023	545	+0.34%
Source: INSEE

== Places of interest ==
- The church of St. Pierre, dating from the twelfth century.

== See also ==
- Communes of the Seine-Maritime department
