= Malaunay =

- Commune
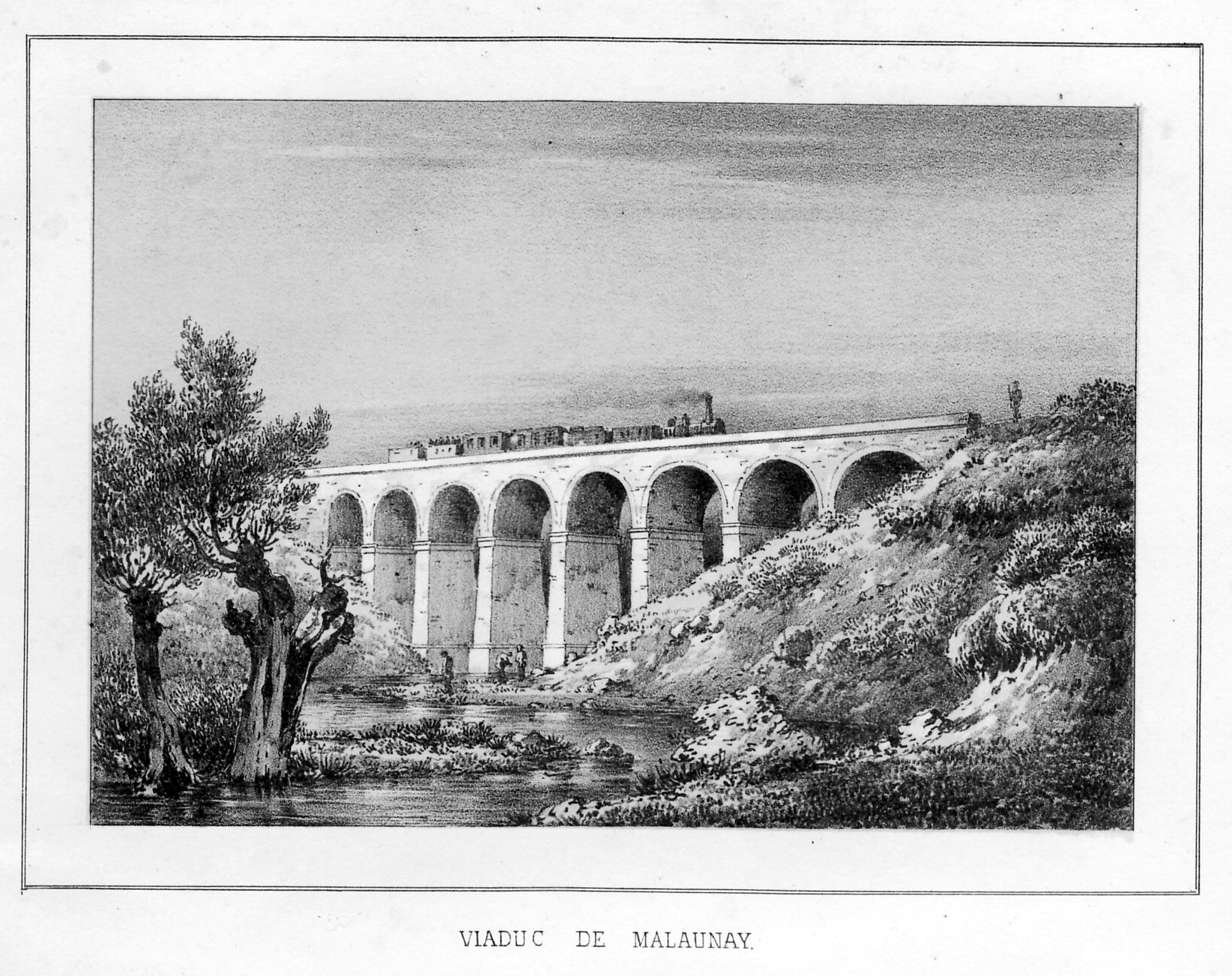
- The Malaunay viaduct
- Location of Malaunay
- Location within France Location within Normandy
- Coordinates: 49°31′37″N 1°02′28″E
- Country: France
- Region: Normandy
- Department: Seine-Maritime
- Arrondissement: Rouen
- Canton: Notre-Dame-de-Bondeville
- Intercommunality: Rouen Metropolis

Government
  - Mayor (2026–32): Guillaume Coutey
- Area^{1}: 9.25 km^{2} (3.57 sq mi)
- Elevation: 67 m (220 ft)
- Highest elevation: 169 m (554 ft)
- Lowest elevation: 34 m (112 ft)
- Population (2023): 6,221
  - Density: 673/km^{2} (1,740/sq mi)
- Time zone: UTC+01:00 (CET)
  - Summer (DST): UTC+02:00 (CEST)
- INSEE/Postal code: 76402 /76770
- ^{1} French Land Register data, which excludes lakes, ponds, glaciers > 1 km^{2} (0.386 sq mi or 247 acres) and river estuaries.

Malaunay (French pronunciation: [malonɛ]) is a commune of the Rouen Metropolis in the Seine-Maritime department in Normandy, Northwestern France.

== Geography ==
Malaunay is a town lying along the banks of the River Cailly, some 9 miles (14 km) north of Rouen, at the junction of the D51, D155 and the D927 roads. Agriculture, farming and light industry are the mainstay of the local economy.

== Population ==
Historical population
Year	Pop.	±% p.a.
1968	4,230	—
1975	4,875	+2.05%
1982	5,065	+0.55%
1990	5,784	+1.67%
1999	6,022	+0.45%
2007	5,906	−0.24%
2012	5,940	+0.11%
2017	6,110	+0.57%
2023	6,221	+0.30%
Source: INSEE

== Places of interest ==
- The church of St.Nicolas, dating from the nineteenth century.
- An old manorhouse.

== Twin towns ==
- Sandy, United Kingdom
- Amer, Spain

== See also ==
- Communes of the Seine-Maritime department
