= Édouard Delamare-Deboutteville =

French inventor, engineer and industrialist

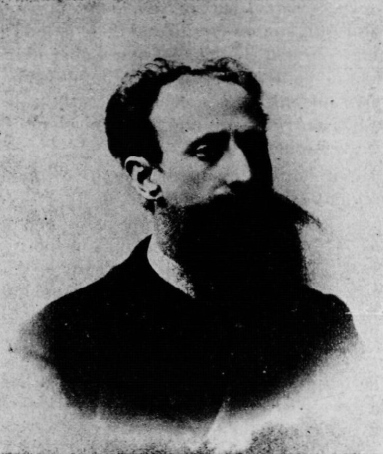
- Born: 8 February 1856; Rouen, France
- Died: 17 February 1901; Fontaine-le-Bourg, France
- Occupations: Inventor, engineer, industrialist
- Known for: Early internal combustion automobile

Édouard Napoléon François Delamare-Deboutteville (8 February 1856 – 17 February 1901) was a French inventor, engineer, and industrialist. He is known for designing and operating one of the earliest automobiles powered by a petrol-fuelled four-stroke internal combustion engine, predating the Benz Patent-Motorwagen by nearly two years.

== Early life ==
Delamare-Deboutteville was born in Rouen, France, into a wealthy textile industrialist family. He studied at the École Supérieure de Commerce de Rouen and later managed the family spinning mill at Mont-Grimont in Fontaine-le-Bourg.

== Automotive innovation ==
In 1883, he and mechanic Léon Malandin developed an early petrol-fuelled internal combustion engine, first mounted on a tricycle then evolved into a four-wheeled vehicle. On 12 February 1884, they successfully ran a car between Fontaine-le-Bourg and Cailly.

On that day, Delamare-Deboutteville filed French patent no. 160267 (associated with Malandin), which described their four-cylinder petrol vehicle with electrical ignition, chain transmission, shaft and differential. This patent is widely recognized as the first ever granted for a four-wheeled automobile using liquid fuel.

The vehicle specifications as described by historical sources include:

- Twin-cylinder horizontal engine (~8 hp at 250 rpm, ≈ 8129 cm³ displacement)
- Petrol mixed with ~3% oil
- Carburetor, chain drive, and differential

Though fragile and never commercialized, the prototype is considered a technical milestone in automotive history.

== Other work ==
He continued developing gas engines under the brand Simplex. He received a gold medal at the 1889 Exposition Universelle in Paris for a 100 hp gas engine. The Belgian firm John Cockerill acquired manufacturing rights in July 1889 and later produced engines up to 700 hp by 1899.

Delamare-Deboutteville also published works on oyster farming, Sanskrit grammar, and maintained an ornithological collection. He held over 70 patents and was made Officer of the Legion of Honour in 1896.

== Death ==
He died of typhoid fever on 17 February 1901 at Mont-Grimont near Fontaine-le-Bourg and was buried in the family chapel.

== Legacy ==
While Karl Benz is often credited as the "inventor of the automobile," some historians acknowledge Delamare-Deboutteville as a pioneering precursor in the development of motor vehicles. His contribution is often overshadowed by commercial successes of others.

== See also ==
- History of the automobile
- Karl Benz
- Étienne Lenoir
- Gottlieb Daimler
