= Sierville =

- Commune
- Location of Sierville
- Location within France Location within Normandy
- Coordinates: 49°35′26″N 1°02′14″E
- Country: France
- Region: Normandy
- Department: Seine-Maritime
- Arrondissement: Rouen
- Canton: Bois-Guillaume

Government
  - Mayor (2026–32): Yves Loisel
- Area^{1}: 15.91 km^{2} (6.14 sq mi)
- Elevation: 150 m (490 ft)
- Highest elevation: 181 m (594 ft)
- Lowest elevation: 120 m (390 ft)
- Population (2023): 1,102
  - Density: 69.26/km^{2} (179.4/sq mi)
- Time zone: UTC+01:00 (CET)
  - Summer (DST): UTC+02:00 (CEST)
- INSEE/Postal code: 76675 /76690
- ^{1} French Land Register data, which excludes lakes, ponds, glaciers > 1 km^{2} (0.386 sq mi or 247 acres) and river estuaries.

Sierville is a commune in the Seine-Maritime department in the Normandy region in northern France.

== Geography ==
A farming village situated in the Pays de Caux, some 11 miles (18 km) north of Rouen at the junction of the D927 with the D6, D504 and the D251 roads. The A151 autoroute runs through the middle of the commune's territory.

== Population ==
Historical population
Year	Pop.	±% p.a.
1968	442	—
1975	485	+1.34%
1982	687	+5.10%
1990	817	+2.19%
1999	859	+0.56%
2007	914	+0.78%
2012	989	+1.59%
2017	1,039	+0.99%
2023	1,102	+0.99%
Source: INSEE

== Places of interest ==
- The church of St. Philibert, dating from the eleventh century.
- A thirteenth-century building in a courtyard near the presbytery.
- The eighteenth-century chateau of Bosc-Laurent.

== See also ==
- Communes of the Seine-Maritime department
