= Anceaumeville =

- Commune
- Location of Anceaumeville
- Location within France Location within Normandy
- Coordinates: 49°34′33″N 1°03′50″E
- Country: France
- Region: Normandy
- Department: Seine-Maritime
- Arrondissement: Rouen
- Canton: Bois-Guillaume
- Intercommunality: Inter-Caux-Vexin

Government
  - Mayor (2023–2026): Yves Foucault
- Area^{1}: 4.68 km^{2} (1.81 sq mi)
- Elevation: 160 m (520 ft)
- Highest elevation: 181 m (594 ft)
- Lowest elevation: 55 m (180 ft)
- Population (2023): 708
  - Density: 151/km^{2} (392/sq mi)
- Time zone: UTC+01:00 (CET)
  - Summer (DST): UTC+02:00 (CEST)
- INSEE/Postal code: 76007 /76710
- ^{1} French Land Register data, which excludes lakes, ponds, glaciers > 1 km^{2} (0.386 sq mi or 247 acres) and river estuaries.

Anceaumeville (French pronunciation: [ɑ̃somvil]) is a commune in the Seine-Maritime department in the Normandy region in northern France.

== Geography ==
A farming village situated by the banks of the river Clérette some 10 miles (16 km) north of Rouen at the junction of the D251 and the D115 roads.

== Population ==
Historical population
Year	Pop.	±% p.a.
1968	350	—
1975	367	+0.68%
1982	521	+5.13%
1990	566	+1.04%
1999	714	+2.61%
2007	670	−0.79%
2012	697	+0.79%
2017	647	−1.48%
2023	708	+1.51%
Source: INSEE

== Places of interest ==
- The church of St.Martin, dating from the sixteenth century.

== See also ==
- Communes of the Seine-Maritime department
