= Frichemesnil =

- Commune
- Coat of arms
- Location of Frichemesnil
- Location within France Location within Normandy
- Coordinates: 49°37′22″N 1°08′25″E
- Country: France
- Region: Normandy
- Department: Seine-Maritime
- Arrondissement: Rouen
- Canton: Bois-Guillaume

Government
  - Mayor (2020–2026): Philippe Blot
- Area^{1}: 8.1 km^{2} (3.1 sq mi)
- Elevation: 165 m (541 ft)
- Highest elevation: 172 m (564 ft)
- Lowest elevation: 115 m (377 ft)
- Population (2023): 411
  - Density: 51/km^{2} (130/sq mi)
- Time zone: UTC+01:00 (CET)
  - Summer (DST): UTC+02:00 (CEST)
- INSEE/Postal code: 76290 /76690
- ^{1} French Land Register data, which excludes lakes, ponds, glaciers > 1 km^{2} (0.386 sq mi or 247 acres) and river estuaries.

Frichemesnil (French pronunciation: [fʁiʃmenil]) is a commune in the Seine-Maritime department in the Normandy region in northern France.

== Geography ==
Frichemesnil is a farming village situated in the Pays de Caux, 15 miles (24 km) north of Rouen, at the junction of the D100 and the D97 roads. The A29 autoroute passes through the commune's northern section.

== Population ==
Historical population
Year	Pop.	±% p.a.
1968	240	—
1975	248	+0.47%
1982	316	+3.52%
1990	406	+3.18%
1999	402	−0.11%
2007	398	−0.12%
2012	433	+1.70%
2017	412	−0.99%
2023	411	−0.04%
Source: INSEE

== Places of interest ==
- The church of Notre-Dame, dating from the thirteenth century.

== See also ==
- Communes of the Seine-Maritime department
