= Clères =

- Commune
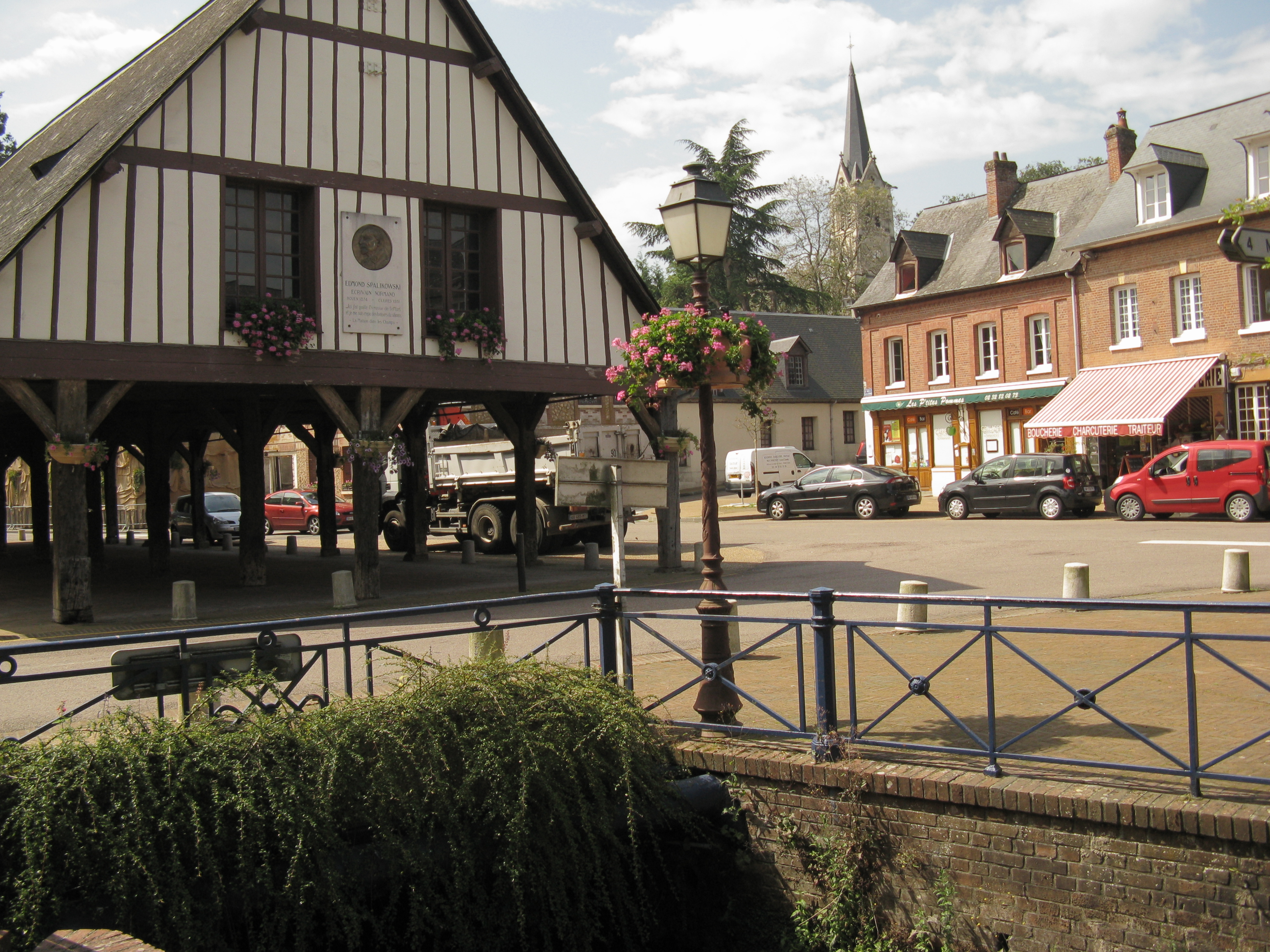
- The covered marketplace in Clères

- Coat of arms
- Location of Clères
- Location within France Location within Normandy
- Coordinates: 49°36′01″N 1°06′40″E
- Country: France
- Region: Normandy
- Department: Seine-Maritime
- Arrondissement: Rouen
- Canton: Bois-Guillaume
- Intercommunality: Inter-Caux-Vexin

Government
  - Mayor (2020–2026): Nathalie Thierry
- Area^{1}: 11.36 km^{2} (4.39 sq mi)
- Elevation: 113 m (371 ft)
- Highest elevation: 181 m (594 ft)
- Lowest elevation: 63 m (207 ft)
- Population (2023): 1,381
  - Density: 121.6/km^{2} (314.9/sq mi)
- Time zone: UTC+01:00 (CET)
  - Summer (DST): UTC+02:00 (CEST)
- INSEE/Postal code: 76179 /76690
- ^{1} French Land Register data, which excludes lakes, ponds, glaciers > 1 km^{2} (0.386 sq mi or 247 acres) and river estuaries.

Clères (French pronunciation: [klɛʁ]) is a commune in the Seine-Maritime department in the Normandy region in north-western France.

== Geography ==
A farming and forestry market town situated by the banks of the Clérette river, in the Pays de Caux, some 17 miles (27 km) northeast of Rouen, at the junction of the D 2, D 6, D 53 and the D 100 roads. SNCF has a TER railway station in the town.

== Heraldry ==
Arms of Clères	The arms of Clères are blazoned : Argent, a bend azure diapered Or, charged with a flamingo Or.

== Population ==
Historical population
Year	Pop.	±% p.a.
1968	1,055	—
1975	1,091	+0.48%
1982	1,302	+2.56%
1990	1,254	−0.47%
1999	1,266	+0.11%
2007	1,308	+0.41%
2012	1,374	+0.99%
2017	1,369	−0.07%
2023	1,381	+0.15%
Source: INSEE

== Places of interest ==
- The church of Sts. Waast-&-Nicolas, dating from the sixteenth century.
- The church of St. Sauveur at Cordelleville, dating from the twelfth century.
- The church of Notre-Dame at Le Tôt, dating from the twelfth century.
- A château and its park, home of the zoo.
- A seventeenth century sandstone cross.
- Ruins of a medieval castle.
- Several ancient wood-framed houses.
- The eighteenth century market hall ‘Les Halles’.
- Cleres Zoological Park

== People with links to the commune ==
- Jean Delacour, ornithologist, lived here.

== Twin towns ==
- Goldenstedt, Germany, since 1989
- Leverkusen, Germany, since 2000

== See also ==
- Communes of the Seine-Maritime department

== Bibliography ==
- Hippolyte Lemarchand, Histoire du canton de Clères, 1891; Le Pucheux, Fontaine-le-Bourg, 2002 ISBN 2-9517552-2-8
