= Montville, Seine-Maritime =

Montville
- Commune
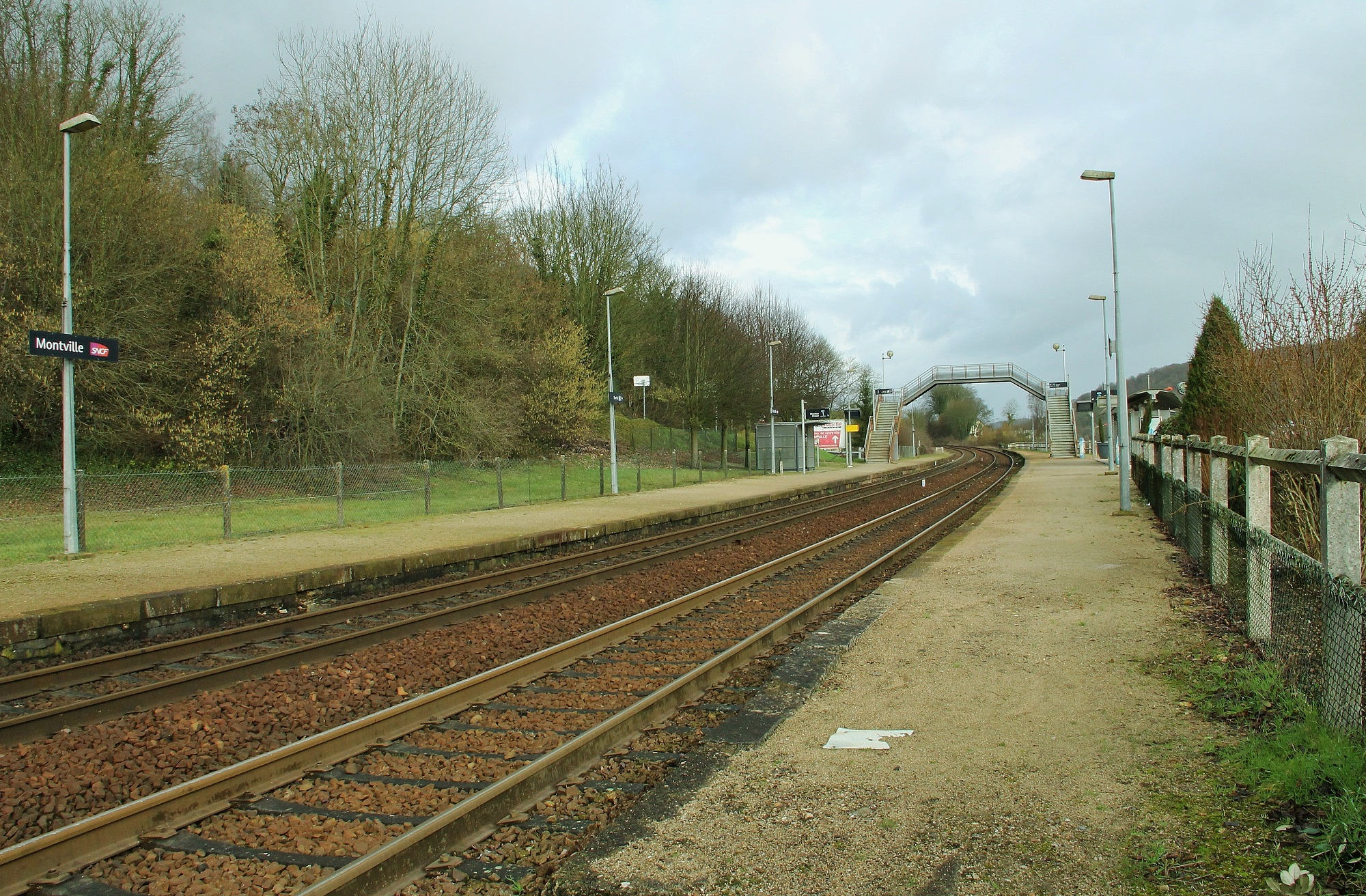
- Montville railway station

- Coat of arms
- Location of Montville
- Location within France Location within Normandy
- Coordinates: 49°32′50″N 1°04′35″E
- Country: France
- Region: Normandy
- Department: Seine-Maritime
- Arrondissement: Rouen
- Canton: Bois-Guillaume
- Intercommunality: Inter-Caux-Vexin

Government
  - Mayor (2026–32): Anne-Sophie Clabaut
- Area^{1}: 10.85 km^{2} (4.19 sq mi)
- Elevation: 51 m (167 ft)
- Highest elevation: 178 m (584 ft)
- Lowest elevation: 42 m (138 ft)
- Population (2023): 4,625
  - Density: 426.3/km^{2} (1,104/sq mi)
- Time zone: UTC+01:00 (CET)
  - Summer (DST): UTC+02:00 (CEST)
- INSEE/Postal code: 76452 /76710
- ^{1} French Land Register data, which excludes lakes, ponds, glaciers > 1 km^{2} (0.386 sq mi or 247 acres) and river estuaries.

Montville (French pronunciation: [mɔ̃vil]) is a commune in the Seine-Maritime department in the Normandy region in north-western France.

== Geography ==
A small town of forestry farming and light industry situated some 9 miles (14 km) north of Rouen at the junction of the D44, D51 and the D155 roads. SNCF operates a TER train service here. Two small rivers meet here, the Clérette and the Cailly.

== 1845 tornado ==
On August 19, 1845, a violent F5/T10 tornado hit Montville, killing 75 and injuring another 130. Many trees were debarked and uprooted. Many buildings were completely leveled, including three well-built mills. The tornado travelled 15 km (9.3 mi) and had an average width of about 300 metres (980 ft).

== Heraldry ==
Arms of Montville	The arms of Montville are blazoned : Per fess wavy azure and gules, a barrulet wavy between (in chief) in fess, a toothed wheel between 2 weavers shuttles palewise, and (in base) a plough argent.

== Population ==
Historical population
Year	Pop.	±% p.a.
1968	4,139	—
1975	4,111	−0.10%
1982	4,365	+0.86%
1990	4,252	−0.33%
1999	4,644	+0.98%
2007	4,564	−0.22%
2012	4,795	+0.99%
2017	4,760	−0.15%
2023	4,625	−0.48%
Source: INSEE

== Places of interest ==
- The church of Notre-Dame de l'Assomption, dating from the eleventh century.
- A 17th century chapel.
- The château, dating from the 19th century.
- The National Firefighters Museum.
- Several interesting old buildings dating from the seventeenth century.
- The mairie, housing a tricolor dating from 1789.

== Twin towns ==
- Haiger (Hesse, Germany)
- Santa Eulàlia de Ronçana (Catalonia, Spain)

== See also ==
- Communes of the Seine-Maritime department
