= Authieux-Ratiéville =

- Commune
- Coat of arms
- Location of Authieux-Ratiéville
- Location within France Location within Normandy
- Coordinates: 49°36′25″N 1°09′07″E
- Country: France
- Region: Normandy
- Department: Seine-Maritime
- Arrondissement: Rouen
- Canton: Bois-Guillaume
- Intercommunality: CC Inter-Caux-Vexin

Government
  - Mayor (2020–2026): Serge Vallée
- Area^{1}: 5.16 km^{2} (1.99 sq mi)
- Elevation: 137 m (449 ft)
- Highest elevation: 166 m (545 ft)
- Lowest elevation: 107 m (351 ft)
- Population (2023): 401
  - Density: 77.7/km^{2} (201/sq mi)
- Time zone: UTC+01:00 (CET)
  - Summer (DST): UTC+02:00 (CEST)
- INSEE/Postal code: 76038 /76690
- ^{1} French Land Register data, which excludes lakes, ponds, glaciers > 1 km^{2} (0.386 sq mi or 247 acres) and river estuaries.

Authieux-Ratiéville (French pronunciation: [otjø ʁatjevil]) is a commune in the Seine-Maritime department in the Normandy region in northern France.

== Geography ==
A farming village situated in the Rouënnais, some 24 miles (39 km) northwest of Rouen just off the D6 road.

== Population ==
Historical population
| Year | Pop. | ±% p.a. |
|---|---|---|
| 1968 | 178 | — |
| 1975 | 136 | −3.77% |
| 1982 | 183 | +4.33% |
| 1990 | 262 | +4.59% |
| 1999 | 342 | +3.01% |
| 2007 | 400 | +1.98% |
| 2012 | 400 | +0.00% |
| 2017 | 405 | +0.25% |
| 2023 | 401 | −0.17% |
Source: INSEE

== Places of interest ==
- The church of Notre-Dame, dating from the sixteenth century.

== See also ==
- Communes of the Seine-Maritime department
