= Le Bocasse =

- Commune
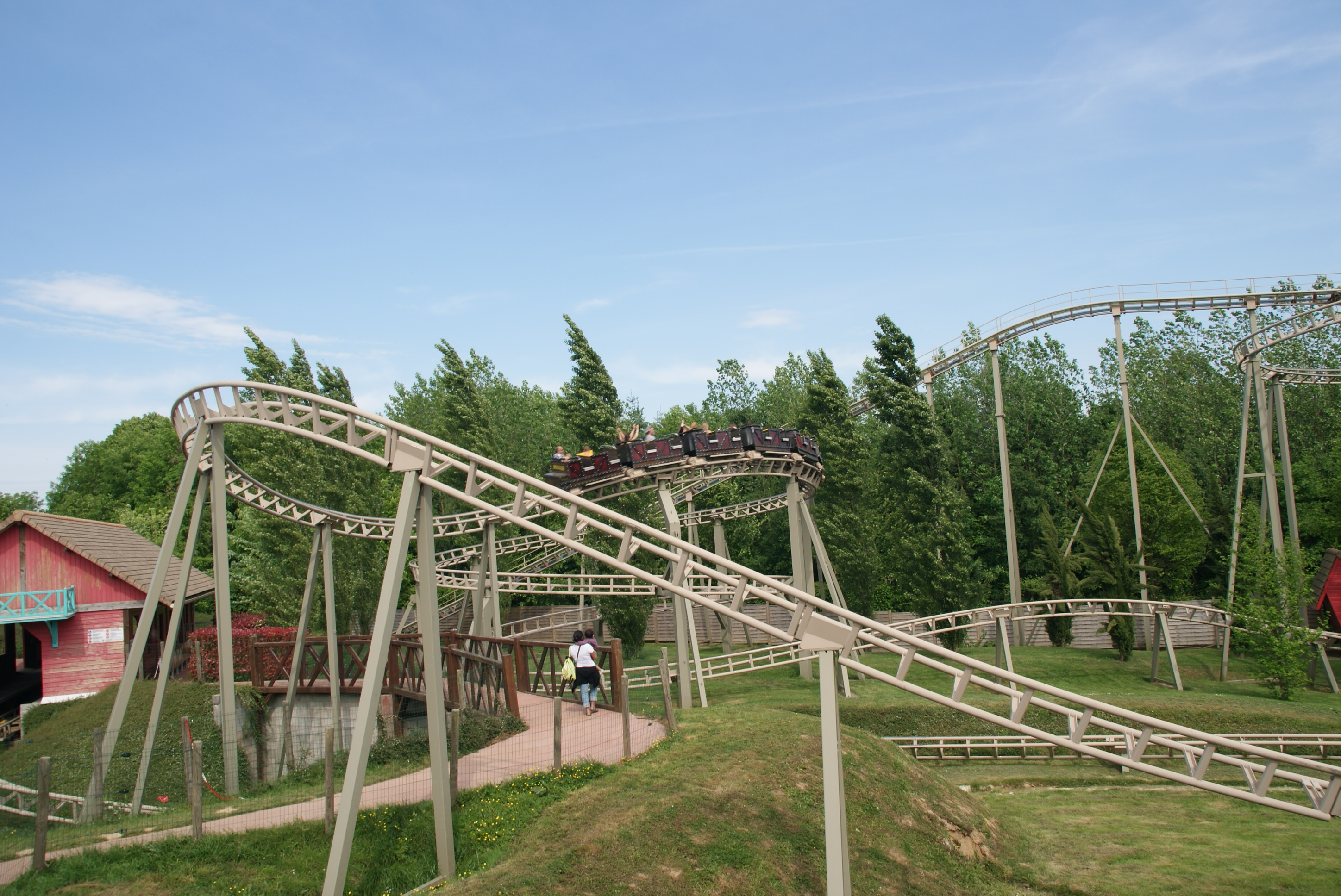
- The Bocasse Park

- Coat of arms
- Location of Le Bocasse
- Location within France Location within Normandy
- Coordinates: 49°36′23″N 1°04′59″E
- Country: France
- Region: Normandy
- Department: Seine-Maritime
- Arrondissement: Rouen
- Canton: Bois-Guillaume

Government
  - Mayor (2026–32): Xavier Bertram
- Area^{1}: 8.62 km^{2} (3.33 sq mi)
- Elevation: 180 m (590 ft)
- Highest elevation: 186 m (610 ft)
- Lowest elevation: 112 m (367 ft)
- Population (2023): 654
  - Density: 75.9/km^{2} (197/sq mi)
- Time zone: UTC+01:00 (CET)
  - Summer (DST): UTC+02:00 (CEST)
- INSEE/Postal code: 76105 /76690
- ^{1} French Land Register data, which excludes lakes, ponds, glaciers > 1 km^{2} (0.386 sq mi or 247 acres) and river estuaries.

Le Bocasse (French pronunciation: [lə bɔkas], before 1962: Bocasse) is a commune in the Seine-Maritime department in the Normandy region in northern France.

== Geography ==
A farming village with associated light industry situated some 12 miles (19 km) north of Rouen, at the junction of the D53 and the D6 roads and also the D927 and D99.

== Population ==
Historical population
Year	Pop.	±% p.a.
1968	378	—
1975	446	+2.39%
1982	572	+3.62%
1990	660	+1.80%
1999	725	+1.05%
2007	742	+0.29%
2012	707	−0.96%
2017	666	−1.19%
2023	654	−0.30%
Source: INSEE

== Places of interest ==
- The church of Notre-Dame, dating from the sixteenth century.
- The château de Cleres, dating from the seventeenth century.
- The sixteenth century manor house at Valmartin.
- The church of St. Georges, Valmartin, dating from the twelfth century.
- A museum of agricultural machinery.
- Cleres zoo park.
- Parc du Bocasse, an Amusement park

== See also ==
- Communes of the Seine-Maritime department
