= Le Houlme =

- Commune
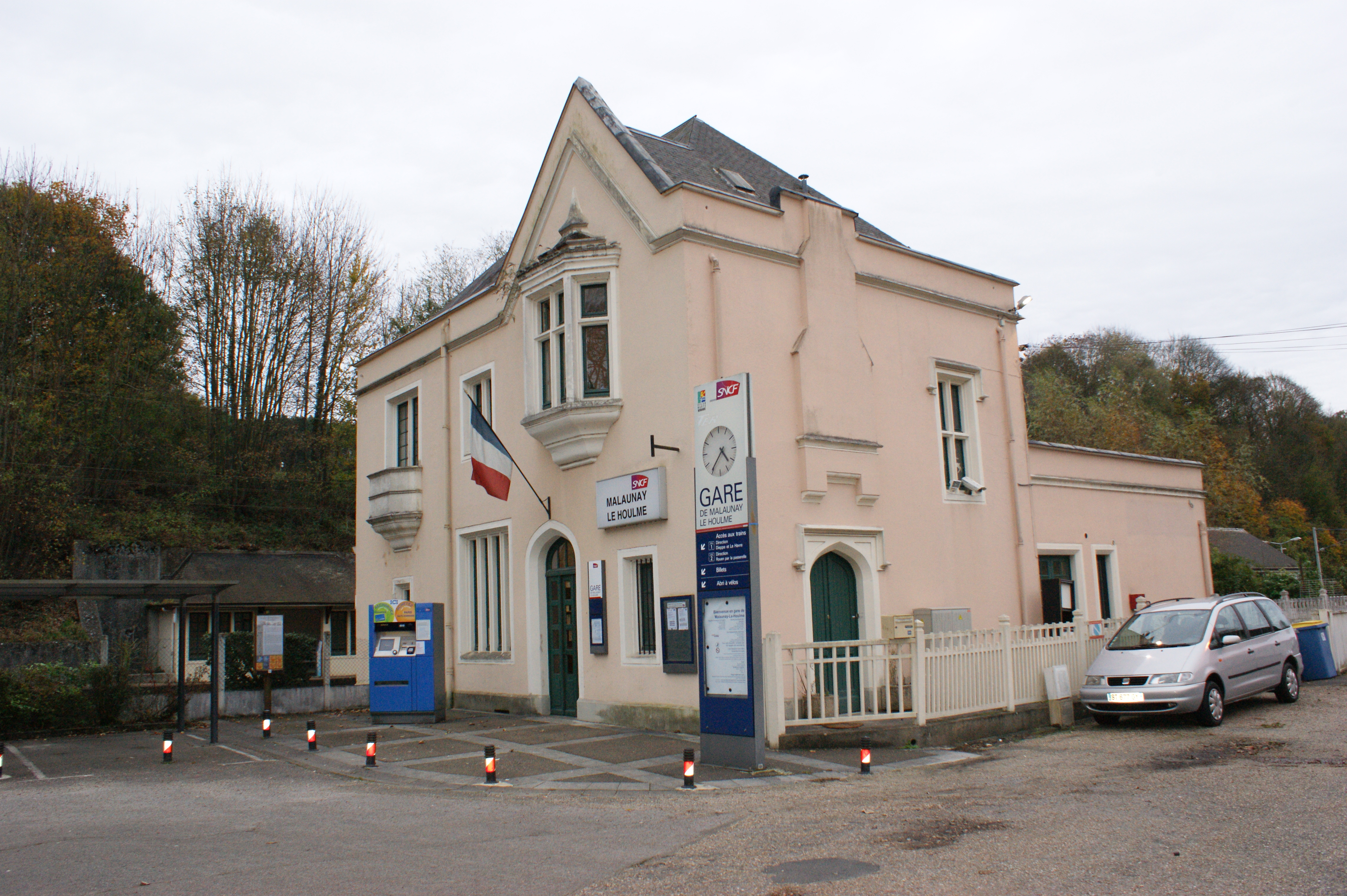
- The Malaunay-Le Houlme railway station
- Location of Le Houlme
- Location within France Location within Normandy
- Coordinates: 49°30′29″N 1°02′10″E
- Country: France
- Region: Normandy
- Department: Seine-Maritime
- Arrondissement: Rouen
- Canton: Notre-Dame-de-Bondeville
- Intercommunality: Métropole Rouen Normandie

Government
  - Mayor (2026–32): Auban Al Jiboury
- Area^{1}: 2.97 km^{2} (1.15 sq mi)
- Elevation: 47 m (154 ft)
- Highest elevation: 128 m (420 ft)
- Lowest elevation: 22 m (72 ft)
- Population (2023): 4,130
  - Density: 1,390/km^{2} (3,600/sq mi)
- Time zone: UTC+01:00 (CET)
  - Summer (DST): UTC+02:00 (CEST)
- INSEE/Postal code: 76366 /76770
- ^{1} French Land Register data, which excludes lakes, ponds, glaciers > 1 km^{2} (0.386 sq mi or 247 acres) and river estuaries.

Le Houlme (French pronunciation: [lə ulm]) is a commune in the Seine-Maritime department in the Normandy region in northern France.

== Geography ==
A small light industrial and farming town situated by the banks of the river Cailly, some 7 miles (11 km) northwest of the centre of Rouen at the junction of the D51, D90 and the D927 roads. SNCF operates a TER service here. The town is located in a place where the Cailly's valley is beginning to narrow. Thus, the town extends from the Cailly's valley to the beginning of the plateau of Normandy, with some housings located on the cliffs leading to the plateau itself.

== Population ==
Historical population
| Year | Pop. | ±% p.a. |
|---|---|---|
| 1968 | 3,935 | — |
| 1975 | 4,324 | +1.36% |
| 1982 | 4,351 | +0.09% |
| 1990 | 4,349 | −0.01% |
| 1999 | 4,397 | +0.12% |
| 2007 | 4,110 | −0.84% |
| 2012 | 4,002 | −0.53% |
| 2017 | 4,050 | +0.24% |
| 2023 | 4,130 | +0.33% |
Source: INSEE

== Places of interest ==
- The church of St.Martin, dating from the nineteenth century, an interesting example of neo-gothic architectural style.
- The war memorial, on the central square of the town ("Place des Canadiens", referring to the Canadian soldiers who were the first of the Allies to step in the town at the end of World War II).
- In the streets closer to the Cailly River, it is possible to see several typical factory worker houses from the 19th century, reminding the industrial past of the town and of the Cailly River's valley.

== See also ==
- Communes of the Seine-Maritime department
