= Grugny =

- Commune
- Location of Grugny
- Location within France Location within Normandy
- Coordinates: 49°37′20″N 1°06′40″E
- Country: France
- Region: Normandy
- Department: Seine-Maritime
- Arrondissement: Rouen
- Canton: Bois-Guillaume

Government
  - Mayor (2026–32): Fabienne Lécaudé
- Area^{1}: 3.18 km^{2} (1.23 sq mi)
- Elevation: 170 m (560 ft)
- Highest elevation: 170 m (560 ft)
- Lowest elevation: 108 m (354 ft)
- Population (2023): 1,004
  - Density: 316/km^{2} (818/sq mi)
- Time zone: UTC+01:00 (CET)
  - Summer (DST): UTC+02:00 (CEST)
- INSEE/Postal code: 76331 /76690
- ^{1} French Land Register data, which excludes lakes, ponds, glaciers > 1 km^{2} (0.386 sq mi or 247 acres) and river estuaries.

Grugny (French pronunciation: [ɡʁyɲi]) is a commune in the Seine-Maritime department in the Normandy region in northern France.

== Geography ==
A farming village situated some 15 miles (24 km) north of Rouen, at the junction of the D3, D3a and the D97 roads. The A29 autoroute passes through the northern section of the commune's territory.

== Population ==
Historical population
Year	Pop.	±% p.a.
1968	1,526	—
1975	1,500	−0.25%
1982	1,412	−0.86%
1990	1,181	−2.21%
1999	972	−2.14%
2007	916	−0.74%
2012	915	−0.02%
2017	1,011	+2.02%
2023	1,004	−0.12%
Source: INSEE

== Places of interest ==
- The church of St.Avoye, dating from the thirteenth century.
- The manor house at Bosc-Folenfant.

== See also ==
- Communes of the Seine-Maritime department
