= Fontaine-le-Bourg =

- Commune
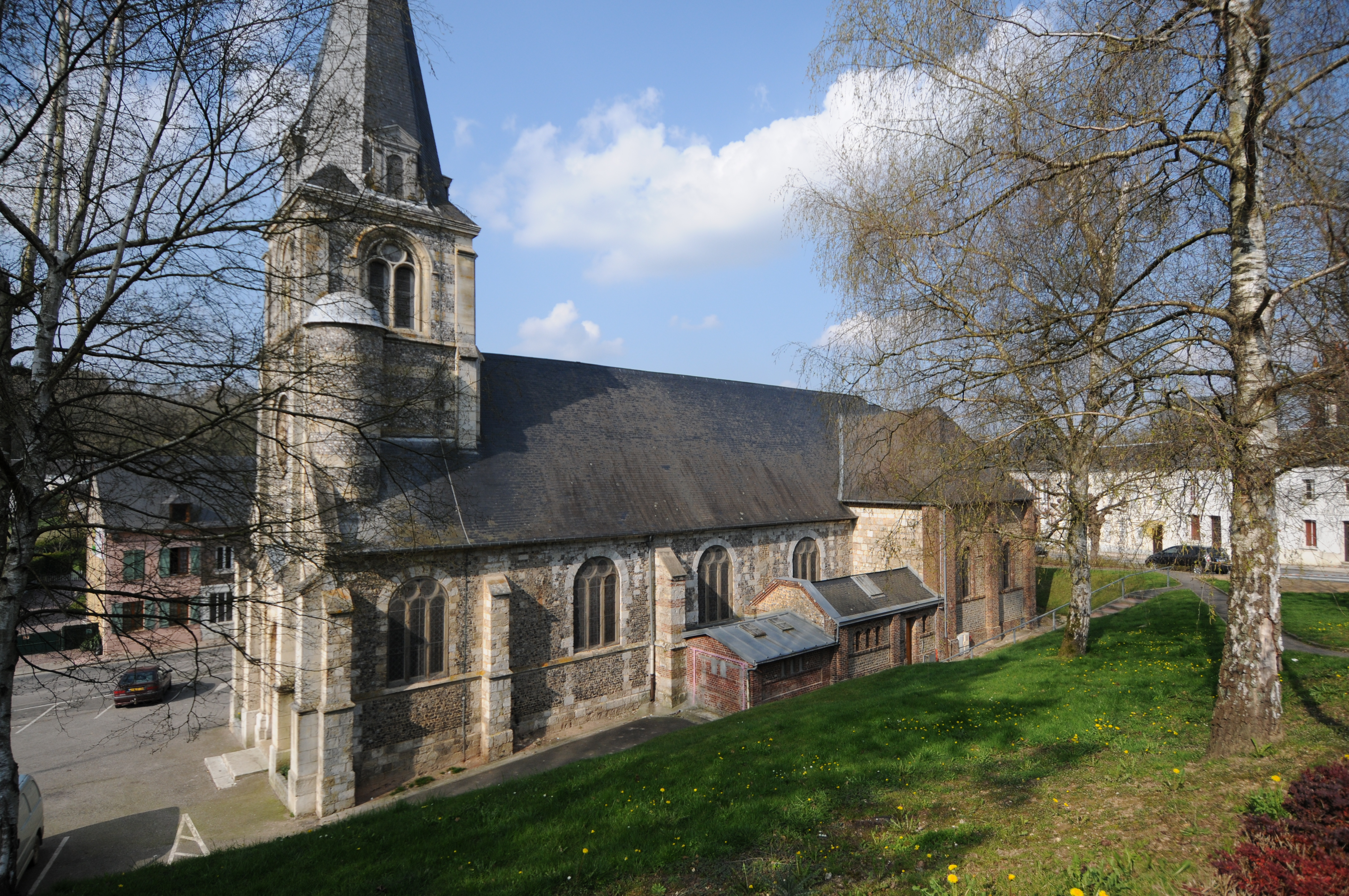
- The church in Fontaine-le-Bourg

- Coat of arms
- Location of Fontaine-le-Bourg
- Location within France Location within Normandy
- Coordinates: 49°33′48″N 1°09′50″E
- Country: France
- Region: Normandy
- Department: Seine-Maritime
- Arrondissement: Rouen
- Canton: Bois-Guillaume
- Intercommunality: Inter-Caux-Vexin

Government
  - Mayor (2026–32): Dany Lemetais
- Area^{1}: 12.2 km^{2} (4.7 sq mi)
- Elevation: 91 m (299 ft)
- Highest elevation: 168 m (551 ft)
- Lowest elevation: 62 m (203 ft)
- Population (2023): 1,881
  - Density: 154/km^{2} (399/sq mi)
- Time zone: UTC+01:00 (CET)
  - Summer (DST): UTC+02:00 (CEST)
- INSEE/Postal code: 76271 /76690
- ^{1} French Land Register data, which excludes lakes, ponds, glaciers > 1 km^{2} (0.386 sq mi or 247 acres) and river estuaries.

Fontaine-le-Bourg (French pronunciation: [fɔ̃tɛn lə buʁ]) is a commune in the Seine-Maritime department in the Normandy region in northern France.

== Geography ==
A village of farming and a little light industry, situated by the banks of the Cailly in the Pays de Caux, some 10 miles (16 km) north of Rouen, at the junction of the D53, D44 and the D151 roads.

== Heraldry ==
Arms of Fontaine-le-Bourg	The arms of Fontaine-le-Bourg are blazoned : Quarterly 1: Gules, a mitre Or; 2: Or a Delmarre-Deboutteville car vert; 3: Or, a weaver's shuttle bendwise vert; 4: gules, a lion Or; all within a bordure compony argent and sable.

== Population ==
Historical population
Year	Pop.	±% p.a.
1968	1,164	—
1975	1,170	+0.07%
1982	1,301	+1.53%
1990	1,420	+1.10%
1999	1,481	+0.47%
2007	1,453	−0.24%
2012	1,533	+1.08%
2017	1,759	+2.79%
2023	1,881	+1.12%
Source: INSEE

== Places of interest ==
- The church of Notre-Dame, dating from the eleventh century.
- Ruins of a 16th-century château.
- A sixteenth century manor house.
- A memorial, erected in 1958 to commemorate an early motor car journey.
- A sixteenth century fountain.
- Old watermills and cotton mills alongside the river.
- A sandstone cross from the seventeenth century.

== Notable people ==
Motor engineer Édouard Delamare-Deboutteville (1856–1901), who, in February 1884, together with Léon Malandin, built and drove a motor car fitted with a 4 stroke internal combustion engine from here to Cailly.

== See also ==
- Communes of the Seine-Maritime department
