= Cailly (river) =

River in France

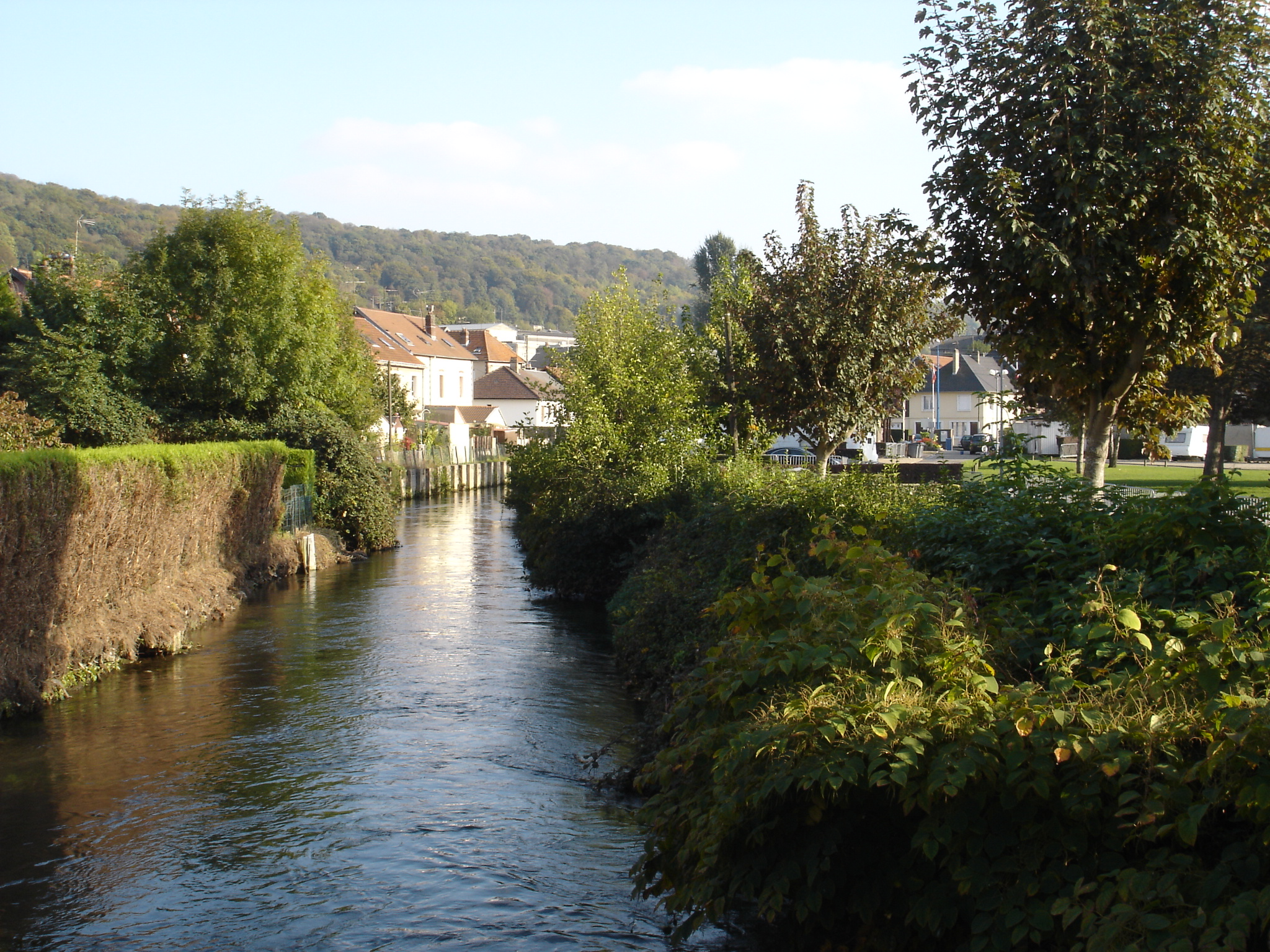
- The Cailly at Déville-lès-Rouen

- Location within France Location within Normandy

Location
- Country: France

Physical characteristics
- Source
  - location: Cailly
  - elevation: 125 m (410 ft)
- Mouth
  - location: The Seine at Rouen
  - coordinates: 49°26′09″N 1°02′43″E
  - elevation: 4 m (13 ft)
- Length: 29.3 km (18.2 mi)
- Basin size: 246 km^{2} (95 sq mi)
- Discharge
  - average: 2.61 m^{3}/s (92 cu ft/s)

Basin features
- Progression: Seine→ English Channel

The Cailly (French pronunciation: [kaji]) is a river in Normandy, France, 29 kilometres (18 mi) in length, flowing through the department of Seine-Maritime. It is a right tributary of the Seine.

== Geography ==
The Cailly has its source in the territory of the commune of Cailly. Taking a southward journey, it flows through Fontaine-le-Bourg, meeting its principal tributary, the Clérette at Montville. It then flows through Malaunay, Houlme, Notre-Dame-de-Bondeville, Maromme, Déville-lès-Rouen and finally Rouen where it joins the Seine on its right bank.

The average flow of the Cailly at Notre-Dame-de-Bondeville is 2.6 m^{3} / second.

== History ==
In the 18th and 19th centuries, the valley was filled with textile mills, which earned it the nickname la petite Manchester, (Little Manchester).

== Bibliography ==
- Albert Hennetier, Aux sources normandes: Promenade au fil des rivières en Seine-Maritime, Ed. Bertout, Luneray, 2006 ISBN 2867436230

== See also ==
- French water management scheme
