= Cailly =

- Commune
- Coat of arms
- Location of Cailly
- Location within France Location within Normandy
- Coordinates: 49°34′49″N 1°13′56″E
- Country: France
- Region: Normandy
- Department: Seine-Maritime
- Arrondissement: Rouen
- Canton: Le Mesnil-Esnard

Government
  - Mayor (2026–32): Julien Cordier
- Area^{1}: 5.44 km^{2} (2.10 sq mi)
- Elevation: 114 m (374 ft)
- Highest elevation: 176 m (577 ft)
- Lowest elevation: 111 m (364 ft)
- Population (2023): 731
  - Density: 134/km^{2} (348/sq mi)
- Time zone: UTC+01:00 (CET)
  - Summer (DST): UTC+02:00 (CEST)
- INSEE/Postal code: 76152 /76690
- ^{1} French Land Register data, which excludes lakes, ponds, glaciers > 1 km^{2} (0.386 sq mi or 247 acres) and river estuaries.

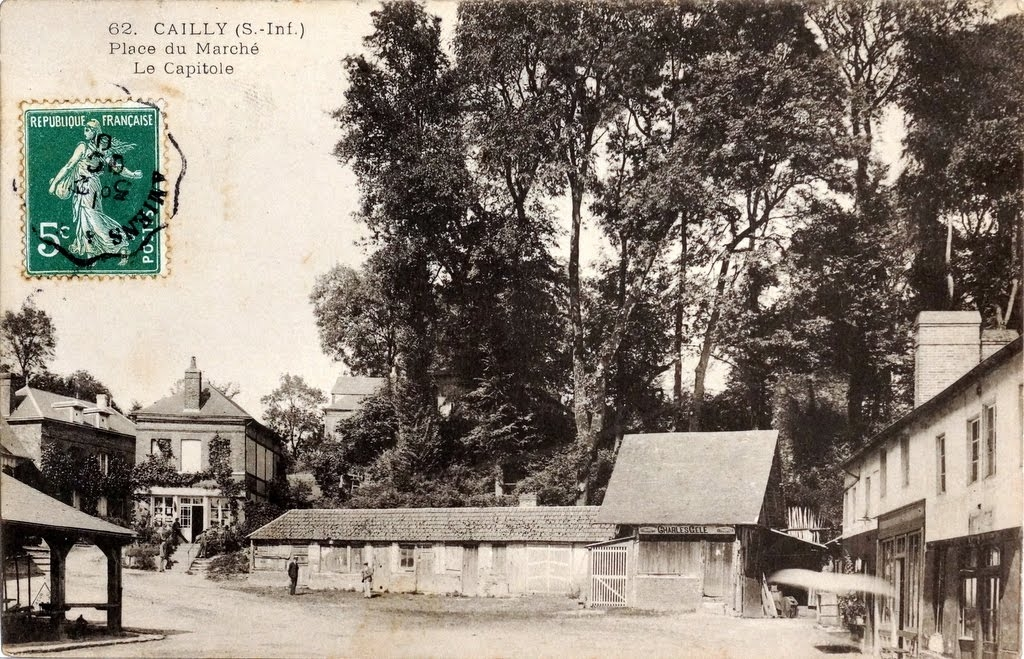
Cailly

Cailly (French pronunciation: [kaji]) is a commune in the Seine-Maritime department in the Normandy region in northern France.

== Geography ==
A farming village situated in the Rouennais, some 18 miles (29 km) northeast of Rouen, at the junction of the D6, D12 and the D44 roads. The commune is the source of the small river of the same name, the Cailly.

== Population ==
Historical population
Year	Pop.	±% p.a.
1968	333	—
1975	500	+5.98%
1982	640	+3.59%
1990	685	+0.85%
1999	739	+0.85%
2007	733	−0.10%
2012	714	−0.52%
2017	790	+2.04%
2023	731	−1.29%
Source: INSEE

== Places of interest ==
- The church of St.Martin, dating from the twelfth century.
- Vestiges of a 12th-century castle.

== See also ==
- Communes of the Seine-Maritime department
