= Canton of Pavilly =

Coordinates: 49°35′51″N 0°54′15″E

Pavilly
- Former canton
- Interactive map of Pavilly
- Country: France
- Region: Normandy
- Department: Seine-Maritime
- No. of communes: {{{nbcomm}}}
- Disbanded: 2015
- Area: 175.18 km^{2} (67.64 sq mi)
- Population (2012): 31,229
  - Density: 178.27/km^{2} (461.71/sq mi)

The Canton of Pavilly is a former canton situated in the Seine-Maritime département and in the Haute-Normandie region of northern France. It was disbanded following the French canton reorganisation which came into effect in March 2015. It had a total of 31,229 inhabitants (2012).

== Geography ==
An area of farming with some light industry, situated 13 miles (21 km) to the northwest of Rouen in the arrondissement of Rouen. The altitude varies from 17m (Betteville) to 182m (Butot) with an average altitude of 124m.

The canton comprised 22 communes:

- Barentin
- Beautot
- Betteville
- Blacqueville
- Bouville
- Butot
- Carville-la-Folletière
- Croix-Mare
- Écalles-Alix
- Émanville
- La Folletière
- Fresquiennes
- Fréville
- Goupillières
- Gueutteville
- Limésy
- Mesnil-Panneville
- Mont-de-l'If
- Pavilly
- Sainte-Austreberthe
- Saint-Ouen-du-Breuil
- Villers-Écalles

== Population ==
Historical population Canton of Pavilly
Year	1962	1968	1975	1982	1990	1999
Pop.	18,985	22,238	24,042	27,488	29,291	30,428
±%	—	+17.1%	+8.1%	+14.3%	+6.6%	+3.9%
From the year 1962 on: No double counting – residents of multiple communes (e.g. students and military personnel) are counted only once. Source: INSEE

== See also ==
- Arrondissements of the Seine-Maritime department
- Cantons of the Seine-Maritime department
- Communes of the Seine-Maritime department
