= A150 autoroute =

Road in France

A150 autoroute

Route information
- Length: 32.4 km (20.1 mi)
- Existed: 1973 (Rouen to Barentin) under the numbering A15; 2015 (Barentin to Yvetot)–present

Major junctions
- South-East end: N 1338 in Rouen

- A 151 in Roumare

- North-West end: E44 / A 29 in Les Hauts-de-Caux

Location
- Country: France
- Major cities: Rouen

Highway system
- Roads in France; Autoroutes; Routes nationales

The A150 autoroute is a short motorway northwest of Rouen, France. It connects Rouen to Yvetot in the Seine-Maritime department.

This motorway was originally numbered A15.

== Route ==
=== Free section (Rouen-Barentin) ===
Opened in 1973, the motorway started in Rouen at the entrance to Déville-lès-Rouen where it has been connected to the Gustave-Flaubert bridge since 2008 (allows the A150 to be connected to the A13 via the so-called Sud III collector and the A139). It heads northwest, with the A151 branching off towards Dieppe, it continued to Barentin (where it served the Mesnil-Roux shopping centre).

=== Toll section (Barentin - Yvetot/A29) ===
Since March 2015, the A150 has been bypassing Barentin and reaches the A29 at Veauville-lès-Baons. At Barentin, the 478-metre-long Austreberthe viaduct passes over the Austreberthe valley.

The section was inaugurated on 29 January 2015, 4 weeks ahead of schedule but its opening, originally scheduled for Monday 2 February, was postponed to 9 February in order to finalize some security elements. Financing at around 240 million euros, its design, construction and operation have been granted to the Albea consortium (Autoroute Liaison Barentin Écalles-Alix) for a period of 55 years, with NGE having been the lead manager and includes Fayat, OFI Infravia and Société Financière A150.

== List of junctions ==
Region	Department	Junction	Destinations	Notes
Normandy	Seine-Maritime	1 : Maromme	Maromme, Canteleu	Entry and exit from Rouen
Normandy	Seine-Maritime	2 : La Vaupaliere	Maromme, Canteleu, Saint-Jean-du-Cardonnay, La Vaupalière, Duclair	
Normandy	Seine-Maritime	A151 - A150	Calais, Amiens (A29), Dieppe, Malaunay	Entry and exit from Rouen
Normandy	Seine-Maritime	3 : Barentin	Barentin, Pavilly, Fécamp, Le Havre	
Normandy	Seine-Maritime	Aire de La Vaupalière (Westbound)		
Normandy	Seine-Maritime	4 : Yvetot	Yvetot, Sainte-Marie-des-Champs, Saint-Valery-en-Caux, Cany-Barville, Pavilly	
Normandy	Seine-Maritime	A29 - A150	Le Havre, Fécamp	Entry and exit from Le Havre
1.000 mi = 1.609 km; 1.000 km = 0.621 mi
