= A150 =

A150 may refer to:

- A150 road (Great Britain), a designation previously allocated to a road between Wisbech and Long Sutton, England
- A150 motorway (France), a motorway north west of Rouen
- Design A-150 battleship, also known as the Super Yamato class, formerly a Japanese plan for a class of battleships
