= Mont-de-l'If =

- Part of Saint Martin de l'If
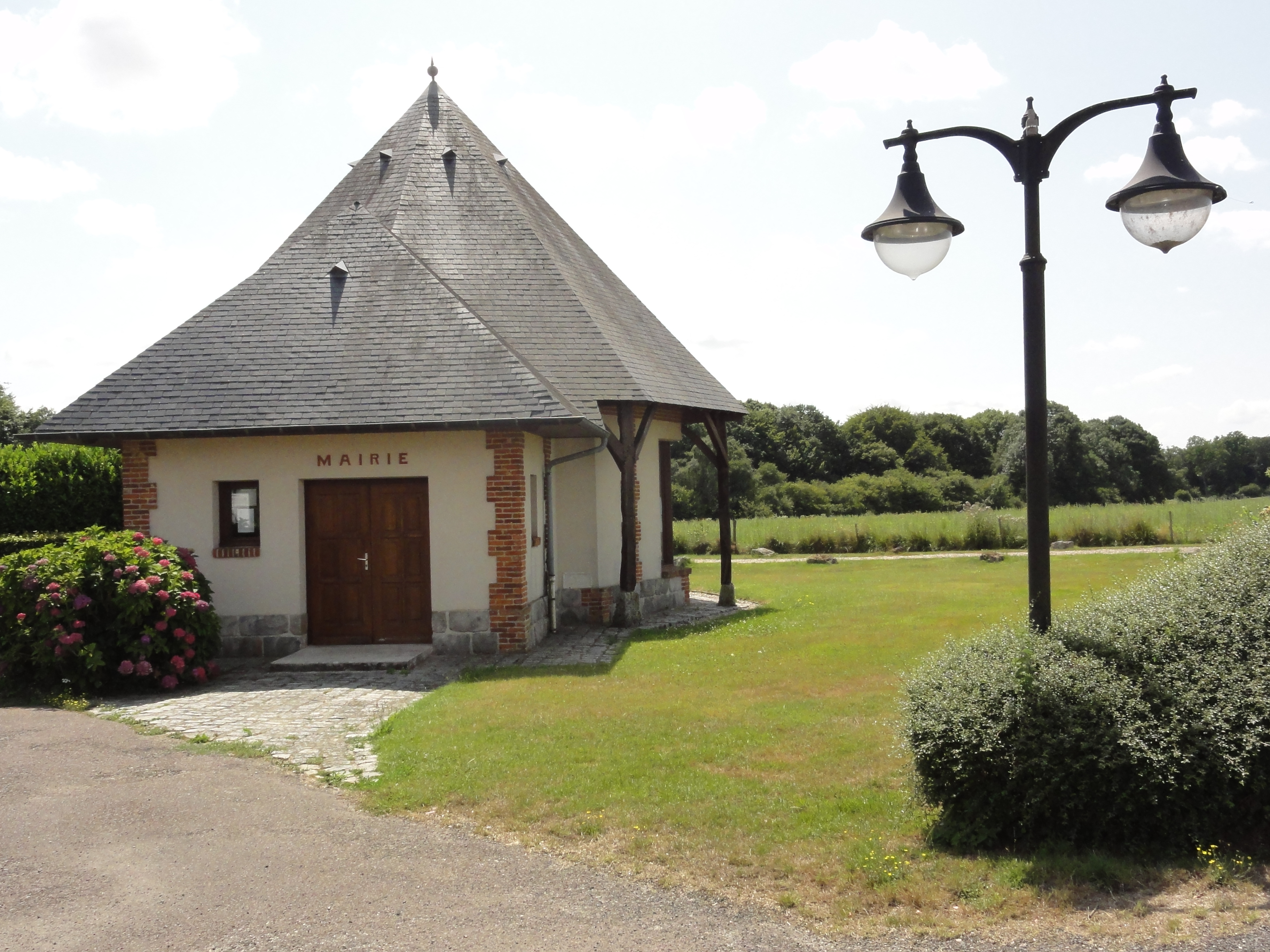
- Mont-de-l'If (Seine-Maritime) Town hall
- Location of Mont-de-l'If
- Location within France Location within Normandy
- Coordinates: 49°35′22″N 0°49′34″E
- Country: France
- Region: Normandy
- Department: Seine-Maritime
- Arrondissement: Rouen
- Canton: Notre-Dame-de-Bondeville
- Commune: Saint Martin de l'If
- Area^{1}: 3.5 km^{2} (1.4 sq mi)
- Elevation: 130 m (430 ft)
- Highest elevation: 140 m (460 ft)
- Lowest elevation: 50 m (160 ft)
- Population (2018): 116
  - Density: 33/km^{2} (86/sq mi)
- Time zone: UTC+01:00 (CET)
  - Summer (DST): UTC+02:00 (CEST)
- Postal code: 76190
- ^{1} French Land Register data, which excludes lakes, ponds, glaciers > 1 km^{2} (0.386 sq mi or 247 acres) and river estuaries.

Mont-de-l'If (French pronunciation: [mɔ̃ də lif]) is a former commune in the Seine-Maritime department in the Normandy region in northern France. On 1 January 2016, it was merged into the new commune of Saint Martin de l'If.

== Geography ==
A very small farming village, situated along the banks of the Cesne in the Pays de Caux, some 22 miles (35 km) northwest of Rouen at the junction of the D304, D89 and the D5 roads.

== Population ==
Historical population
Year	Pop.	±% p.a.
1962	91	—
1968	66	−5.21%
1975	53	−3.09%
1982	52	−0.27%
1990	83	+6.02%
1999	96	+1.63%
Source: EHESS

== Places of interest ==
- The church of the Trinity, dating from the eleventh century.

== See also ==
- Communes of the Seine-Maritime department
