= La Vaupalière =

- Commune
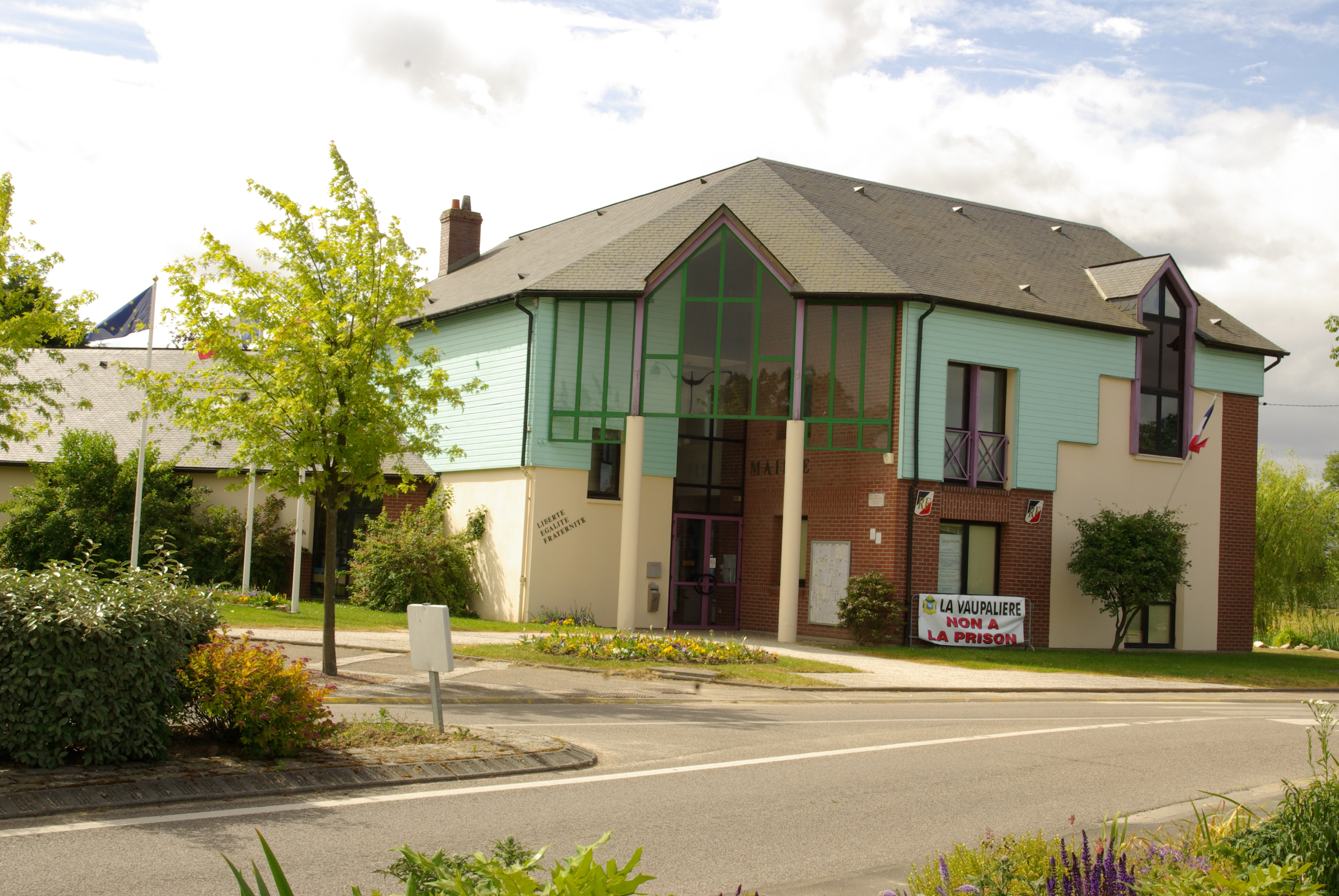
- The town hall in La Vaupalière

- Coat of arms
- Location of La Vaupalière
- Location within France Location within Normandy
- Coordinates: 49°29′19″N 0°59′45″E
- Country: France
- Region: Normandy
- Department: Seine-Maritime
- Arrondissement: Rouen
- Canton: Notre-Dame-de-Bondeville

Government
  - Mayor (2026–32): Baptiste Dias Ferreira
- Area^{1}: 8.0 km^{2} (3.1 sq mi)
- Elevation: 120 m (390 ft)
- Highest elevation: 138 m (453 ft)
- Lowest elevation: 50 m (160 ft)
- Population (2023): 1,245
  - Density: 160/km^{2} (400/sq mi)
- Time zone: UTC+01:00 (CET)
  - Summer (DST): UTC+02:00 (CEST)
- INSEE/Postal code: 76728 /76150
- ^{1} French Land Register data, which excludes lakes, ponds, glaciers > 1 km^{2} (0.386 sq mi or 247 acres) and river estuaries.

La Vaupalière (French pronunciation: [la vopaljɛʁ]) is a commune in the Seine-Maritime department in the Normandy region in northern France.

== Geography ==
A village of forestry, farming and a little light industry, situated some 6 miles (9.7 km) northwest of Rouen, at the junction of the D267, D43 and the D94 roads. The A151 autoroute passes through the commune's south-eastern section.

== Population ==
Historical population
Year	Pop.	±% p.a.
1968	555	—
1975	668	+2.68%
1982	845	+3.41%
1990	902	+0.82%
1999	1,026	+1.44%
2007	992	−0.42%
2012	960	−0.65%
2017	1,057	+1.94%
2023	1,245	+2.77%
Source: INSEE

== Places of interest ==
- The church of St. Léonard, dating from the sixteenth century.

== See also ==
- Communes of the Seine-Maritime department
