= Houppeville =

- Commune
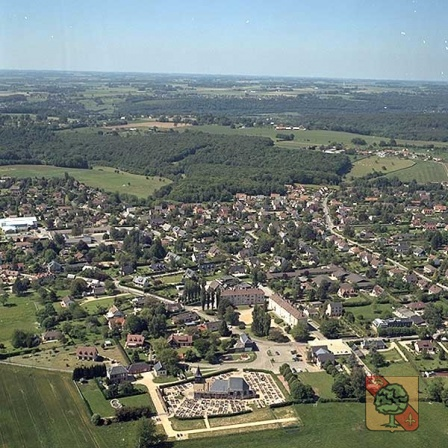
- An aerial view of Houppeville

- Coat of arms
- Location of Houppeville
- Location within France Location within Normandy
- Coordinates: 49°30′48″N 1°04′49″E
- Country: France
- Region: Normandy
- Department: Seine-Maritime
- Arrondissement: Rouen
- Canton: Notre-Dame-de-Bondeville
- Intercommunality: Métropole Rouen Normandie

Government
  - Mayor (2026–32): Monique Bourget
- Area^{1}: 20.8 km^{2} (8.0 sq mi)
- Elevation: 154 m (505 ft)
- Highest elevation: 169 m (554 ft)
- Lowest elevation: 39 m (128 ft)
- Population (2023): 2,814
  - Density: 135/km^{2} (350/sq mi)
- Time zone: UTC+01:00 (CET)
  - Summer (DST): UTC+02:00 (CEST)
- INSEE/Postal code: 76367 /76770
- ^{1} French Land Register data, which excludes lakes, ponds, glaciers > 1 km^{2} (0.386 sq mi or 247 acres) and river estuaries.

Houppeville (French pronunciation: [upvil]) is a commune in the Seine-Maritime department in the Normandy region in northern France.

== Geography ==
A large village of forestry and farming, surrounded by woodland and situated just 4 miles (6.4 km) north of the centre of Rouen, at the junction of the D90, D121 and the D321 roads.

== Heraldry ==
Arms of Houppeville	The arms of Houppeville are blazoned : Or, on a bend gules a leopard and a fleur-de-lys of the field, overall a tree eradicated vert.

== Population ==
Historical population
Year	Pop.	±% p.a.
1968	1,112	—
1975	1,346	+2.77%
1982	1,901	+5.06%
1990	2,378	+2.84%
1999	2,405	+0.13%
2007	2,396	−0.05%
2012	2,567	+1.39%
2017	2,784	+1.64%
2023	2,814	+0.18%
Source: INSEE

== Places of interest ==
- The church of Notre-Dame, dating from the eleventh century.
- The Arboretum de Forêt Verte

== See also ==
- Communes of the Seine-Maritime department
