= Fréville, Seine-Maritime =

Fréville
- Part of Saint Martin de l'If
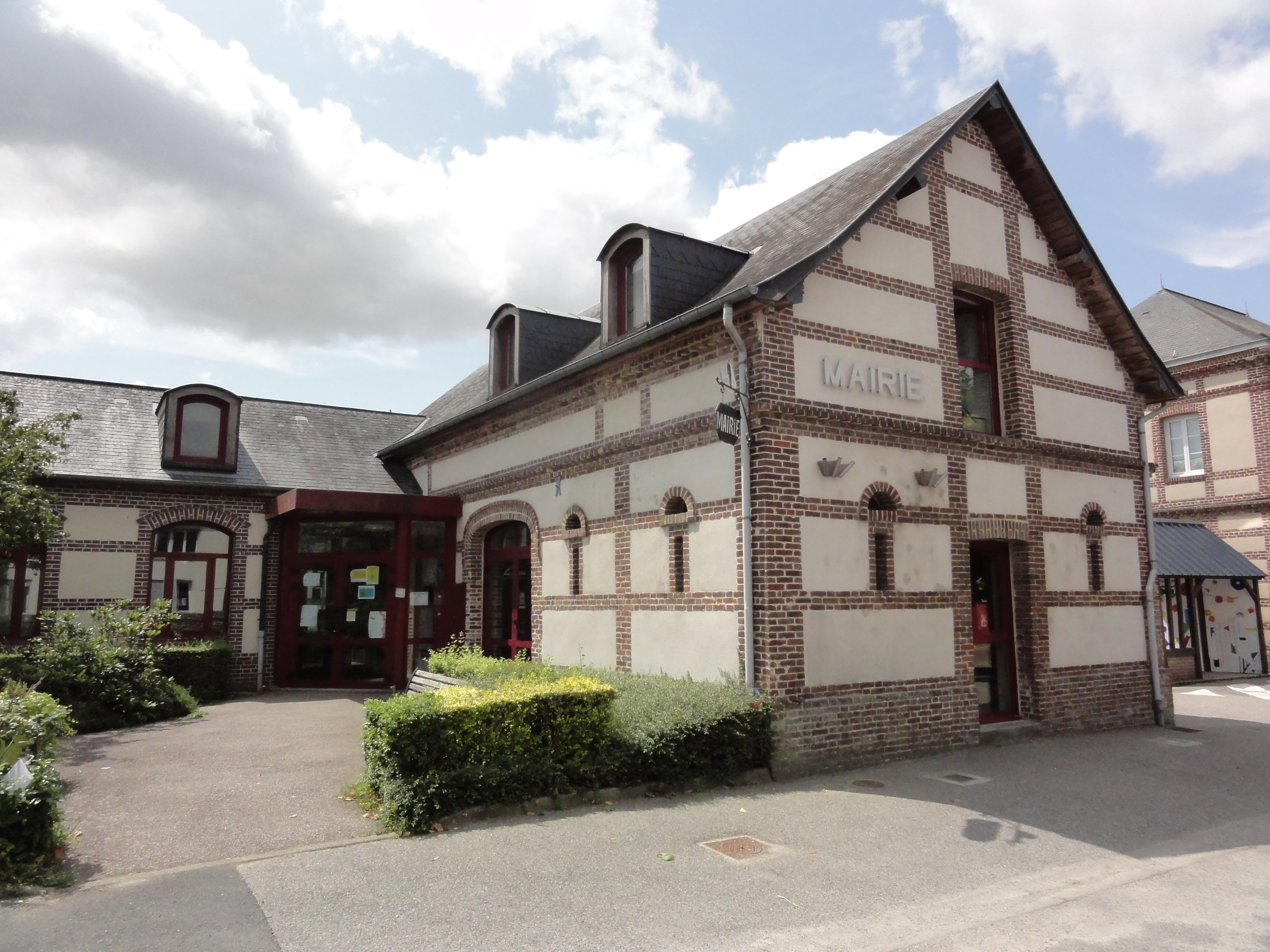
- Fréville Town hall
- Location of Fréville
- Location within France Location within Normandy
- Coordinates: 49°34′04″N 0°49′54″E
- Country: France
- Region: Normandy
- Department: Seine-Maritime
- Arrondissement: Rouen
- Canton: Notre-Dame-de-Bondeville
- Commune: Saint Martin de l'If
- Area^{1}: 5.8 km^{2} (2.2 sq mi)
- Elevation: 135 m (443 ft)
- Highest elevation: 142 m (466 ft)
- Lowest elevation: 77 m (253 ft)
- Population (2018): 951
  - Density: 160/km^{2} (420/sq mi)
- Time zone: UTC+01:00 (CET)
  - Summer (DST): UTC+02:00 (CEST)
- Postal code: 76190
- ^{1} French Land Register data, which excludes lakes, ponds, glaciers > 1 km^{2} (0.386 sq mi or 247 acres) and river estuaries.

Fréville (French pronunciation: [fʁevil]) is a former commune in the Seine-Maritime department in the Normandy region in northern France. On 1 January 2016, it was merged into the new commune of Saint Martin de l'If.

== Geography ==
A farming village situated in the Pays de Caux, some 16 miles (26 km) northwest of Rouen, at the junction of the D5, D22 and the D20 roads.

== Population ==
Historical population
Year	Pop.	±% p.a.
1962	453	—
1968	483	+1.07%
1975	506	+0.67%
1982	705	+4.85%
1990	704	−0.02%
1999	797	+1.39%
2018	951	+0.93%
Source: EHESS and INSEE

== Places of interest ==
- The church of St.Martin, dating from the twelfth century.
- A sixteenth century manor house.

== See also ==
- Communes of the Seine-Maritime department
