= Montigny, Seine-Maritime =

Montigny
- Commune
- Location of Montigny
- Location within France Location within Normandy
- Coordinates: 49°27′37″N 1°00′07″E
- Country: France
- Region: Normandy
- Department: Seine-Maritime
- Arrondissement: Rouen
- Canton: Notre-Dame-de-Bondeville

Government
  - Mayor (2026–32): Philippe Fremont
- Area^{1}: 7.83 km^{2} (3.02 sq mi)
- Elevation: 131 m (430 ft)
- Highest elevation: 136 m (446 ft)
- Lowest elevation: 34 m (112 ft)
- Population (2023): 1,278
  - Density: 163/km^{2} (423/sq mi)
- Time zone: UTC+01:00 (CET)
  - Summer (DST): UTC+02:00 (CEST)
- INSEE/Postal code: 76446 /76380
- ^{1} French Land Register data, which excludes lakes, ponds, glaciers > 1 km^{2} (0.386 sq mi or 247 acres) and river estuaries.

Montigny (French pronunciation: [mɔ̃tiɲi]) is a commune in the Seine-Maritime department in the Normandy region in northern France.

== Geography ==
A farming village completely surrounded by woodland and situated in the Roumois, just 5 miles (8.0 km) northwest of the centre of Rouen at the junction of the D94, D267 and the D86 roads.

== Population ==
Historical population
Year	Pop.	±% p.a.
1968	836	—
1975	933	+1.58%
1982	1,028	+1.39%
1990	1,051	+0.28%
1999	1,114	+0.65%
2007	1,147	+0.37%
2012	1,122	−0.44%
2017	1,240	+2.02%
2023	1,278	+0.50%
Source: INSEE

== Places of interest ==
- The church of St.Ouen, dating from the fifteenth century.
- The chateau, dating from the sixteenth century.

== See also ==
- Communes of the Seine-Maritime department
