= Ralph de Limesy =

Anglo-Norman magnate

Ralph de Limesy (alias de Limesi) lord of the manor of Limésy in Normandy (now a commune in the Seine-Maritime department in the Normandy region in northern France) was a Domesday Book Anglo-Norman magnate and tenant-in-chief of King William the Conqueror. According to Camden: "At the time of the General Survey made by King William the Conqueror, Ralph de Limesi had great possessions in this Realm; viz. in Devonshire four lordships, in Somersetshire seven, in Essex three, in Norfolk two, in Suffolk eleven, in Northamptonshire one, in Warwickshire one, in Hertfordshire four, and in Notinghamshire eight".
