= La Folletière =

- Part of Saint-Martin-de-l'If
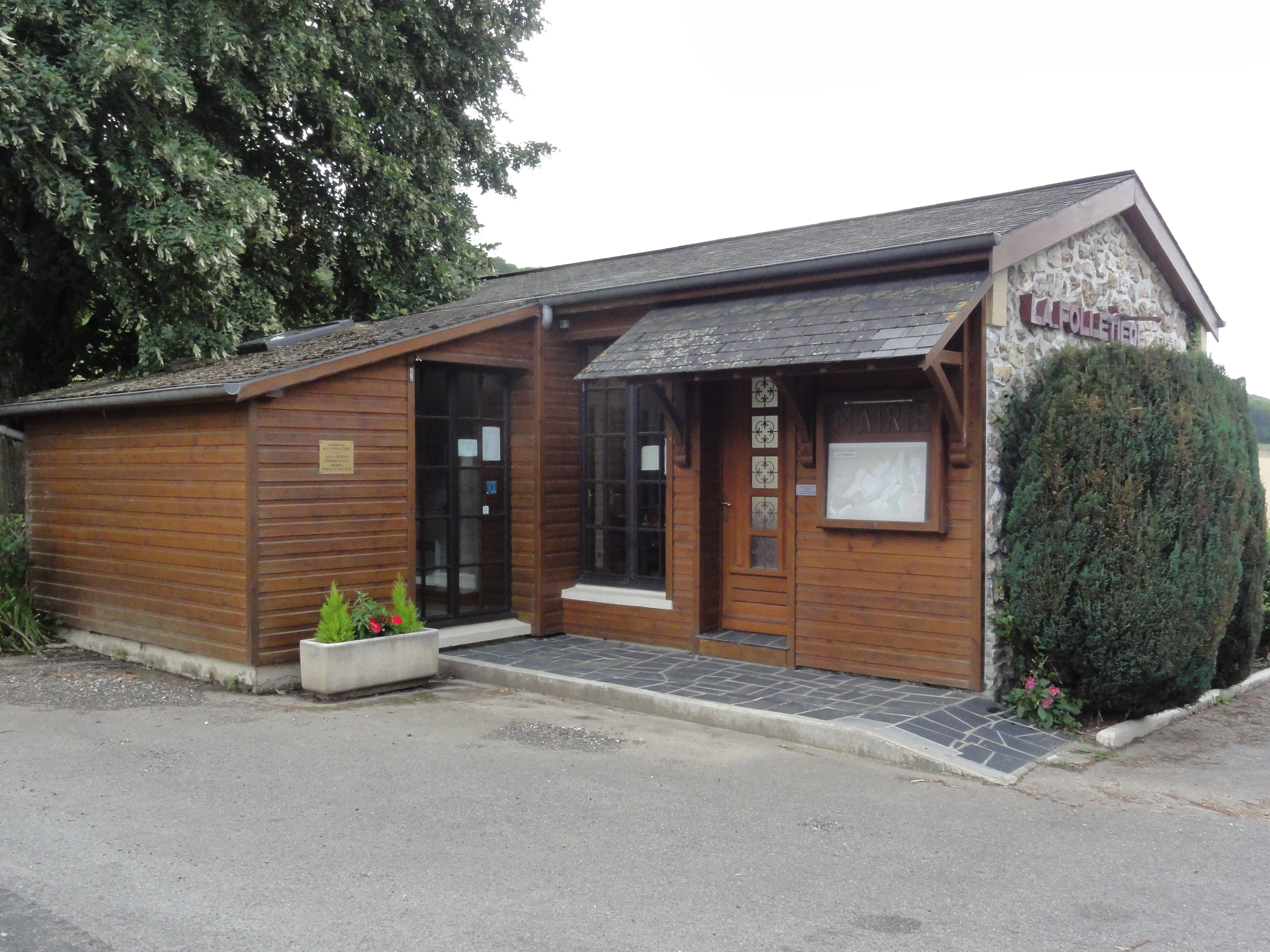
- La Folletière Town hall
- Location of La Folletière
- Location within France Location within Normandy
- Coordinates: 49°34′29″N 0°48′08″E
- Country: France
- Region: Normandy
- Department: Seine-Maritime
- Arrondissement: Rouen
- Canton: Notre-Dame-de-Bondeville
- Commune: Saint-Martin-de-l'If
- Area^{1}: 5.05 km^{2} (1.95 sq mi)
- Elevation: 46 m (151 ft)
- Highest elevation: 137 m (449 ft)
- Lowest elevation: 27 m (89 ft)
- Population (2018): 85
  - Density: 17/km^{2} (44/sq mi)
- Time zone: UTC+01:00 (CET)
  - Summer (DST): UTC+02:00 (CEST)
- Postal code: 76190
- ^{1} French Land Register data, which excludes lakes, ponds, glaciers > 1 km^{2} (0.386 sq mi or 247 acres) and river estuaries.

La Folletière (French pronunciation: [la fɔltjɛʁ]) is a former commune in the Seine-Maritime department in the Normandy region in northern France. On 1 January 2016, it was merged into the new commune of Saint-Martin-de-l'If.

== Geography ==
A very small forestry and farming village situated by the banks of the river Cesne in the Pays de Caux, some 20 miles (32 km) northwest of Rouen, at the junction of the D89 and the D289 roads.

== Places of interest ==
- The sixteenth century church was demolished in 1828.

== See also ==
- Communes of the Seine-Maritime department
