= Betteville =

- Part of Saint Martin de l'If
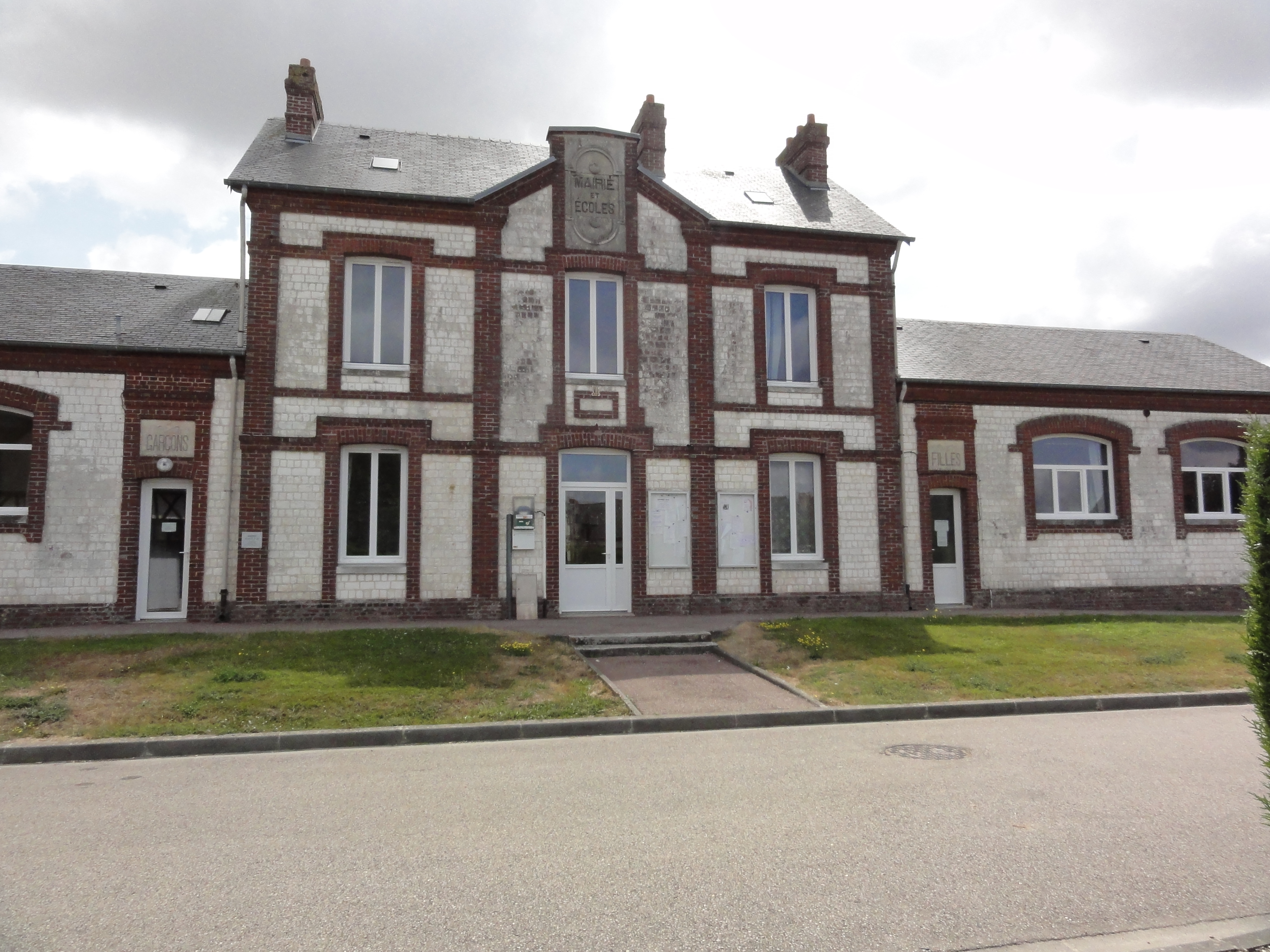
- Betteville Town hall
- Location of Betteville
- Location within France Location within Normandy
- Coordinates: 49°33′08″N 0°47′39″E
- Country: France
- Region: Normandy
- Department: Seine-Maritime
- Arrondissement: Rouen
- Canton: Notre-Dame-de-Bondeville
- Commune: Saint Martin de l'If
- Area^{1}: 8.57 km^{2} (3.31 sq mi)
- Elevation: 115 m (377 ft)
- Highest elevation: 132 m (433 ft)
- Lowest elevation: 17 m (56 ft)
- Population (2018): 561
  - Density: 65.5/km^{2} (170/sq mi)
- Time zone: UTC+01:00 (CET)
  - Summer (DST): UTC+02:00 (CEST)
- Postal code: 76190
- ^{1} French Land Register data, which excludes lakes, ponds, glaciers > 1 km^{2} (0.386 sq mi or 247 acres) and river estuaries.

Betteville (French pronunciation: [bɛtvil]) is a former commune in the Seine-Maritime department in the Normandy region in northern France. On 1 January 2016, it was merged into the new commune of Saint Martin de l'If.

== Geography ==
A farming village situated in the Pays de Caux some 17 miles (27 km) northwest of Rouen, at the junction of the D22, D205 and the D289 roads.

== Population ==
Historical population
Year	Pop.	±% p.a.
1962	367	—
1968	349	−0.83%
1975	337	−0.50%
1982	337	+0.00%
1990	437	+3.30%
1999	485	+1.16%
2018	561	+0.77%
Source: EHESS and INSEE

== Places of interest ==
- The church of St. Ouen, dating from the thirteenth century.
- A fourteenth-century chapel.
- A timber-framed manorhouse with earlier battlements and a dovecote.

== See also ==
- Communes of the Seine-Maritime department
