= Saint Martin de l'If =

- Commune
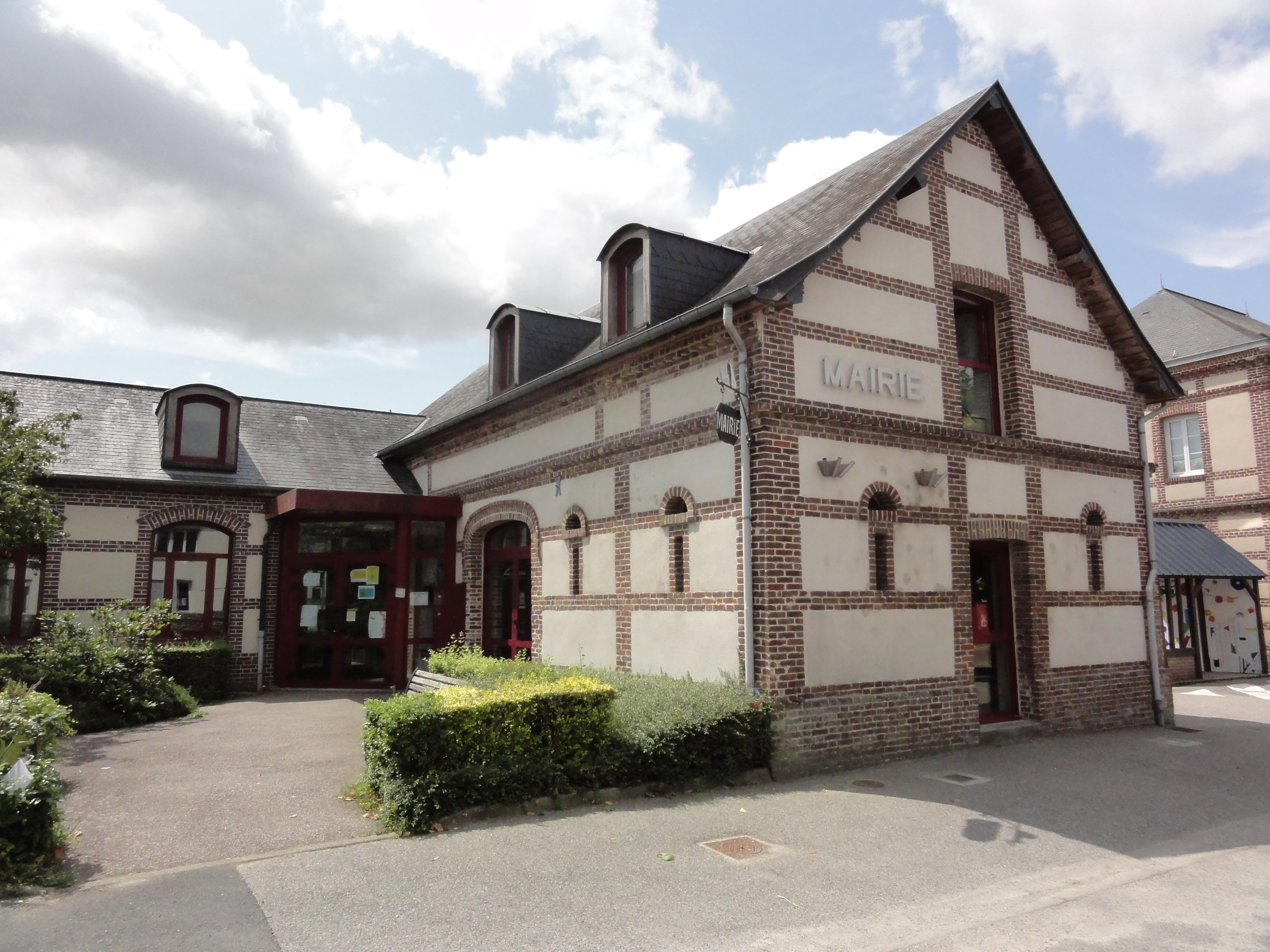
- Saint Martin de l'If Town hall
- Location of Saint Martin de l'If
- Location within France Location within Normandy
- Coordinates: 49°34′05″N 0°49′55″E
- Country: France
- Region: Normandy
- Department: Seine-Maritime
- Arrondissement: Rouen
- Canton: Notre-Dame-de-Bondeville

Government
  - Mayor (2026–32): Sylvain Garand
- Area^{1}: 22.92 km^{2} (8.85 sq mi)
- Population (2023): 1,736
  - Density: 75.74/km^{2} (196.2/sq mi)
- Time zone: UTC+01:00 (CET)
  - Summer (DST): UTC+02:00 (CEST)
- INSEE/Postal code: 76289 /76190
- ^{1} French Land Register data, which excludes lakes, ponds, glaciers > 1 km^{2} (0.386 sq mi or 247 acres) and river estuaries.

Saint Martin de l'If (French pronunciation: [sɛ̃ maʁtɛ̃ də lif]) is a commune in the department of Seine-Maritime, northern France. The municipality was established on 1 January 2016 by merger of the former communes of Fréville, Betteville, La Folletière and Mont-de-l'If.

== Population ==
Population data refer to the area corresponding with the commune as of January 2025.

Historical population
| Year | Pop. | ±% p.a. |
|---|---|---|
| 1968 | 951 | — |
| 1975 | 938 | −0.20% |
| 1982 | 1,141 | +2.84% |
| 1990 | 1,276 | +1.41% |
| 1999 | 1,434 | +1.31% |
| 2007 | 1,531 | +0.82% |
| 2012 | 1,642 | +1.41% |
| 2017 | 1,699 | +0.68% |
| 2023 | 1,736 | +0.36% |
Source: INSEE

== See also ==
- Communes of the Seine-Maritime department
