= Goupillières, Seine-Maritime =

Goupillières
- Commune
- Location of Goupillières
- Location within France Location within Normandy
- Coordinates: 49°35′01″N 0°58′49″E
- Country: France
- Region: Normandy
- Department: Seine-Maritime
- Arrondissement: Rouen
- Canton: Notre-Dame-de-Bondeville

Government
  - Mayor (2026–32): François Dodelin
- Area^{1}: 4.13 km^{2} (1.59 sq mi)
- Elevation: 137 m (449 ft)
- Highest elevation: 152 m (499 ft)
- Lowest elevation: 85 m (279 ft)
- Population (2023): 443
  - Density: 107/km^{2} (278/sq mi)
- Time zone: UTC+01:00 (CET)
  - Summer (DST): UTC+02:00 (CEST)
- INSEE/Postal code: 76311 /76570
- ^{1} French Land Register data, which excludes lakes, ponds, glaciers > 1 km^{2} (0.386 sq mi or 247 acres) and river estuaries.

Goupillières is a commune in the Seine-Maritime department in the Normandy region in northern France.

== Geography ==
A farming village situated by the banks of the river Austreberthe in the Pays de Caux, some 13 miles (21 km) northwest of Rouen, at the junction of the D6 and the D124 roads.

== Population ==
Historical population
Year	Pop.	±% p.a.
1968	276	—
1975	256	−1.07%
1982	306	+2.58%
1990	366	+2.26%
1999	371	+0.15%
2007	423	+1.65%
2012	419	−0.19%
2017	417	−0.10%
2023	443	+1.01%
Source: INSEE

== Places of interest ==
- The chapel of St.Jean-Baptiste, dating from the eighteenth century.

== See also ==
- Communes of the Seine-Maritime department
