= Varneville-Bretteville =

- Commune
- Coat of arms
- Location of Varneville-Bretteville
- Location within France Location within Normandy
- Coordinates: 49°39′10″N 1°02′46″E
- Country: France
- Region: Normandy
- Department: Seine-Maritime
- Arrondissement: Dieppe
- Canton: Luneray
- Intercommunality: CC Terroir de Caux

Government
  - Mayor (2026–32): François Roger
- Area^{1}: 9.22 km^{2} (3.56 sq mi)
- Elevation: 163 m (535 ft)
- Highest elevation: 176 m (577 ft)
- Lowest elevation: 135 m (443 ft)
- Population (2023): 327
  - Density: 35.5/km^{2} (91.9/sq mi)
- Time zone: UTC+01:00 (CET)
  - Summer (DST): UTC+02:00 (CEST)
- INSEE/Postal code: 76721 /76890
- ^{1} French Land Register data, which excludes lakes, ponds, glaciers > 1 km^{2} (0.386 sq mi or 247 acres) and river estuaries.

Varneville-Bretteville (French pronunciation: [vaʁnəvil bʁɛtvil]) is a commune in the Seine-Maritime department in the Normandy region in northern France.

== Geography ==
A forestry and farming commune situated in the Pays de Caux, some 23 miles (37 km) south of Dieppe at the junction of the D927, the D2 and the A151 autoroute.

== Heraldry ==
Arms of Varneville-Bretteville	The arms of the commune of Varneville-Bretteville are blazoned : Gules, a lion, and in chief 2 griffon's heads Or.

== Population ==
Historical population
Year	Pop.	±% p.a.
1968	267	—
1975	236	−1.75%
1982	254	+1.06%
1990	289	+1.63%
1999	292	+0.11%
2007	295	+0.13%
2012	305	+0.67%
2017	324	+1.22%
2023	327	+0.15%
Source: INSEE

== Places of interest ==
- The church of St. Vincent and St. Médard, dating from the thirteenth century.
- The nineteenth-century chateau of Bel-Event
- Remains of a Roman camp called ‘Le Bouteillerie’.
- Vestiges of an ancient castle.
- Old manorhouses, a presbytery and a dovecote.

== See also ==
- Communes of the Seine-Maritime department
