= Villers-Écalles =

- Commune
- Location of Villers-Écalles
- Location within France Location within Normandy
- Coordinates: 49°32′22″N 0°55′13″E
- Country: France
- Region: Normandy
- Department: Seine-Maritime
- Arrondissement: Rouen
- Canton: Barentin

Government
  - Mayor (2026–32): Valérie Granlin
- Area^{1}: 7.41 km^{2} (2.86 sq mi)
- Elevation: 92 m (302 ft)
- Highest elevation: 119 m (390 ft)
- Lowest elevation: 21 m (69 ft)
- Population (2023): 1,698
  - Density: 229/km^{2} (593/sq mi)
- Time zone: UTC+01:00 (CET)
  - Summer (DST): UTC+02:00 (CEST)
- INSEE/Postal code: 76743 /76360
- ^{1} French Land Register data, which excludes lakes, ponds, glaciers > 1 km^{2} (0.386 sq mi or 247 acres) and river estuaries.

Villers-Écalles (French pronunciation: [vilɛʁ ekal]) is a commune in the Seine-Maritime department in the Normandy region in northern France.

== Geography ==
A village of farming and associated light industry situated by the banks of the river Austreberthe in the Pays de Caux, some 15 miles (24 km) northwest of Rouen near the junction of the D88 with the D143 road.
The confectionery company Ferrero has a factory here, employing 800 people to produce Nutella and Kinder Bueno.

== Population ==
Historical population
Year	Pop.	±% p.a.
1968	1,035	—
1975	1,164	+1.69%
1982	1,693	+5.50%
1990	1,777	+0.61%
1999	1,781	+0.02%
2007	1,824	+0.30%
2012	1,792	−0.35%
2017	1,768	−0.27%
2023	1,698	−0.67%
Source: INSEE

== Places of interest ==
- The church of St. Jean, dating from the thirteenth century.
- The ruins of a fifteenth-century chateau with vaulted cellars.
- A seventeenth-century stone cross.

== See also ==
- Communes of the Seine-Maritime department
