= Eslettes =

- Commune
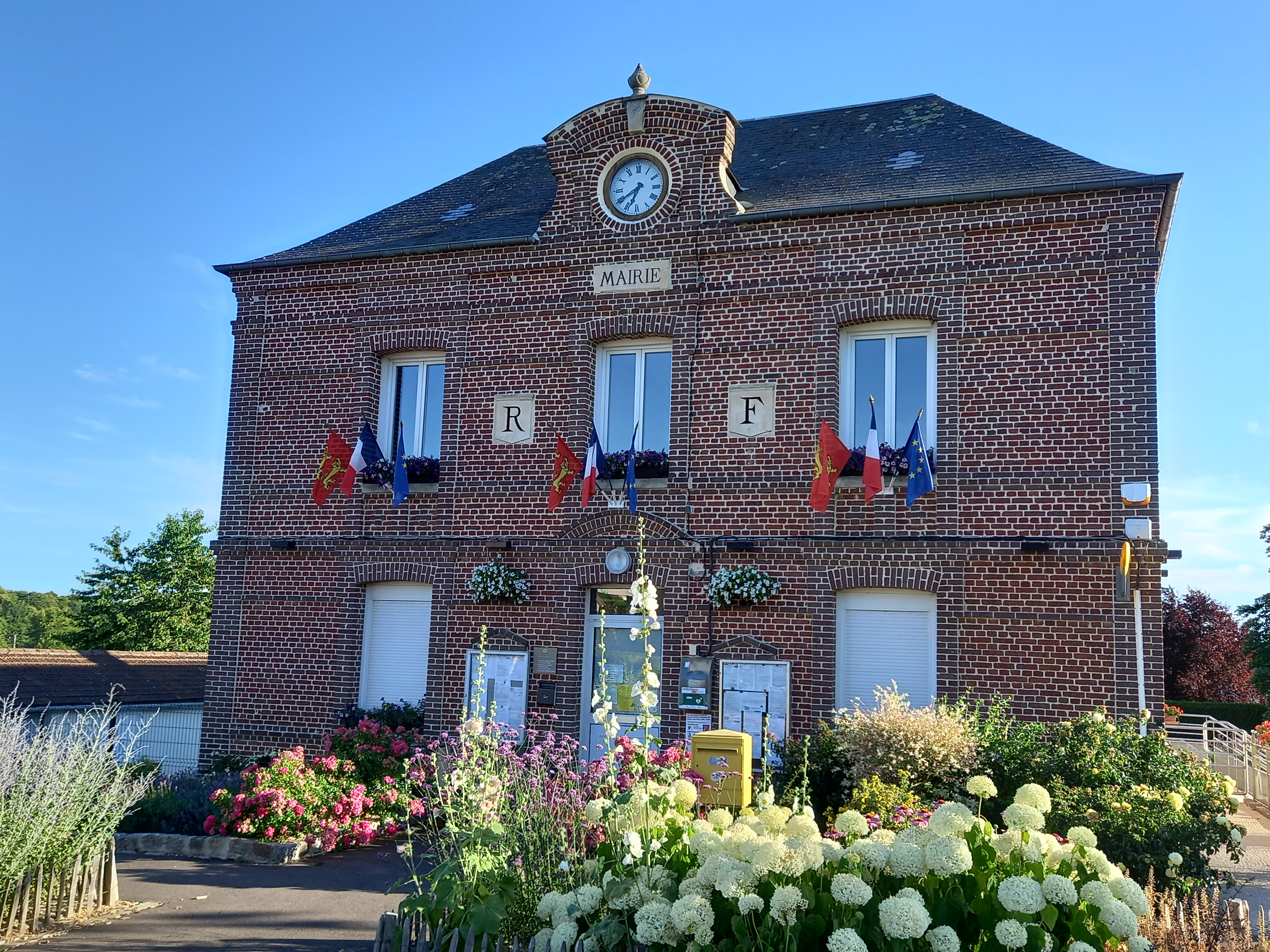
- Town hall
- Location of Eslettes
- Location within France Location within Normandy
- Coordinates: 49°32′49″N 1°03′12″E
- Country: France
- Region: Normandy
- Department: Seine-Maritime
- Arrondissement: Rouen
- Canton: Notre-Dame-de-Bondeville

Government
  - Mayor (2026–32): Roland Gueville
- Area^{1}: 5.12 km^{2} (1.98 sq mi)
- Elevation: 160 m (520 ft)
- Highest elevation: 167 m (548 ft)
- Lowest elevation: 44 m (144 ft)
- Population (2023): 1,620
  - Density: 316/km^{2} (819/sq mi)
- Time zone: UTC+01:00 (CET)
  - Summer (DST): UTC+02:00 (CEST)
- INSEE/Postal code: 76245 /76710
- ^{1} French Land Register data, which excludes lakes, ponds, glaciers > 1 km^{2} (0.386 sq mi or 247 acres) and river estuaries.

Eslettes is a commune in the Seine-Maritime department in the Normandy region in northern France.

== Geography ==
A farming village situated by the banks of the Cailly in the Pays de Caux, some 16 miles (26 km) northeast of Rouen, at the junction of the D251, D44 and the D297 roads. The A151 autoroute pass through the territory of the commune.

== Toponymy ==
Mentioned in a Latinized version : Esletis ab. 1040. Old Norse sletta "flat land" with an Old English plural -s. Same origin as Sleights (Yorkshire), and without -s, Sletten (Denmark).

== Population ==
Historical population
Year	Pop.	±% p.a.
1968	513	—
1975	665	+3.78%
1982	935	+4.99%
1990	1,383	+5.01%
1999	1,396	+0.10%
2007	1,507	+0.96%
2012	1,469	−0.51%
2017	1,567	+1.30%
2023	1,620	+0.56%
Source: INSEE

== Places of interest ==
- The modern church of Sainte-Jeanne-d'Arc (Joan of Arc), dating from the twentieth century. Built between 1920 (canonization year of Joan of Arc) and 1925.
- Two châteaux, de la Ratière and Galais.
- The eighteenth-century château des Alleurs.

== See also ==
- Communes of the Seine-Maritime department
