= Arboretum de Forêt Verte =

Arboretum in Normandy, France

Coordinates: 49.513°N 1.08°E

The Arboretum de Forêt Verte is an arboretum located within the Forêt Domaniale Verte near Houppeville, Seine-Maritime, Normandy, France. It was created in 1970 to study resistance of different trees to pollution.

== See also ==
- List of botanical gardens in France
