= Roumare =

- Commune
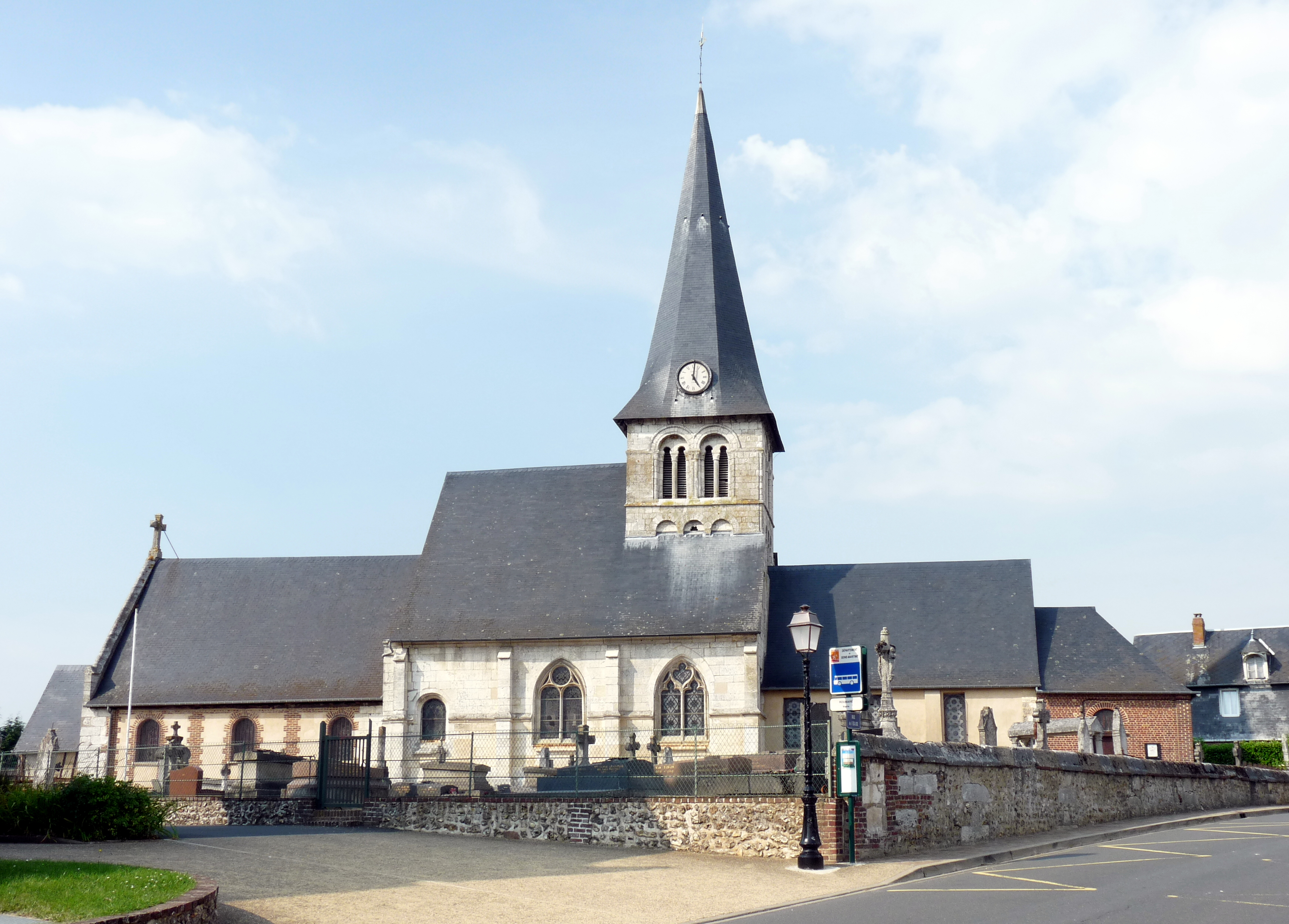
- The church in Roumare
- Location of Roumare
- Location within France Location within Normandy
- Coordinates: 49°30′41″N 0°58′28″E
- Country: France
- Region: Normandy
- Department: Seine-Maritime
- Arrondissement: Rouen
- Canton: Notre-Dame-de-Bondeville

Government
  - Mayor (2026–32): Jean-Paul Couiller
- Area^{1}: 9.96 km^{2} (3.85 sq mi)
- Elevation: 150 m (490 ft)
- Highest elevation: 136 m (446 ft)
- Lowest elevation: 8 m (26 ft)
- Population (2023): 1,560
  - Density: 157/km^{2} (406/sq mi)
- Time zone: UTC+01:00 (CET)
  - Summer (DST): UTC+02:00 (CEST)
- INSEE/Postal code: 76541 /76480
- ^{1} French Land Register data, which excludes lakes, ponds, glaciers > 1 km^{2} (0.386 sq mi or 247 acres) and river estuaries.

Roumare (French pronunciation: [ʁumaʁ]) is a commune in the Seine-Maritime department in the Normandy region in northern France.

== Geography ==
A village of forestry and farming situated in the pays de Caux, just 6 miles (9.7 km) northeast of Rouen at the junction of the D47, D90 and the D67 roads. The junction of the A150 autoroute with the A151 lies entirely within the commune's territory.

== Population ==
Historical population
Year	Pop.	±% p.a.
1968	464	—
1975	608	+3.94%
1982	809	+4.16%
1990	965	+2.23%
1999	1,103	+1.50%
2007	1,348	+2.54%
2012	1,426	+1.13%
2017	1,508	+1.12%
2023	1,560	+0.57%
Source: INSEE

== Places of interest ==
- The church of Notre-Dame, dating from the fifteenth century.
- The sixteenth-century château and its chapel.

== See also ==
- Communes of the Seine-Maritime department
