= Limésy =

- Commune
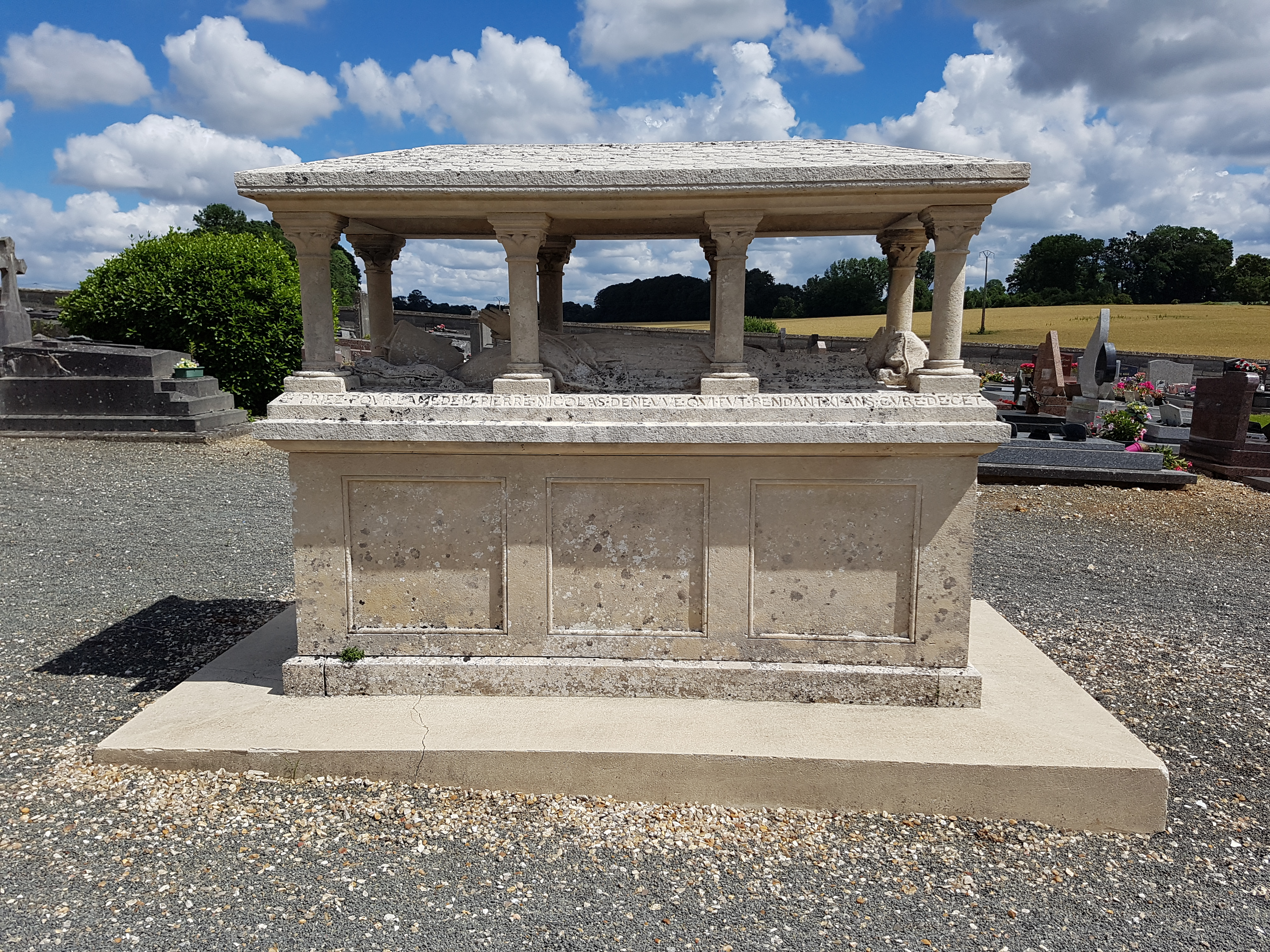
- The tomb of Pierre Nicolas Deneuve
- Location of Limésy
- Location within France Location within Normandy
- Coordinates: 49°36′50″N 0°55′36″E
- Country: France
- Region: Normandy
- Department: Seine-Maritime
- Arrondissement: Rouen
- Canton: Notre-Dame-de-Bondeville

Government
  - Mayor (2026–32): Jean-François Chemin
- Area^{1}: 15.01 km^{2} (5.80 sq mi)
- Elevation: 165 m (541 ft)
- Highest elevation: 173 m (568 ft)
- Lowest elevation: 67 m (220 ft)
- Population (2023): 1,511
  - Density: 100.7/km^{2} (260.7/sq mi)
- Time zone: UTC+01:00 (CET)
  - Summer (DST): UTC+02:00 (CEST)
- INSEE/Postal code: 76385 /76570
- ^{1} French Land Register data, which excludes lakes, ponds, glaciers > 1 km^{2} (0.386 sq mi or 247 acres) and river estuaries.

Limésy (French pronunciation: [limezi]) is a commune in the Seine-Maritime department in the Normandy region in northern France.

== Historical significance ==
Limésy was the origin of one of the greatest and most powerful families in Norman Britain, the de Limesi family. In the Domesday survey of 1086 they held 40 Lordships, and Ralph de Limesy, nephew of William the Conqueror founded Hertford priory. They also held smaller manors all over the Britain such as the manor of Merryfield (Muriefeld 1233) in West Tisted and other lands in the neighboring parish of Ropley.

== Geography ==
A farming village situated in the Pays de Caux some 16 miles (26 km) northwest of Rouen, at the junction of the D142, D63 and the D67 roads.

== Population ==
Historical population
Year	Pop.	±% p.a.
1968	1,043	—
1975	1,093	+0.67%
1982	1,221	+1.59%
1990	1,199	−0.23%
1999	1,306	+0.95%
2007	1,385	+0.74%
2012	1,467	+1.16%
2017	1,523	+0.75%
2023	1,511	−0.13%
Source: INSEE

== Places of interest ==
- The church of St.Martin, dating from the nineteenth century.
- The thirteenth-century château and park.
- Ruins of a château at the hamlet of Brunville.
- The seventeenth-century château of Etennemare.

== See also ==
- Communes of the Seine-Maritime department
