= Sainte-Austreberthe, Seine-Maritime =

Sainte-Austreberthe
- Commune
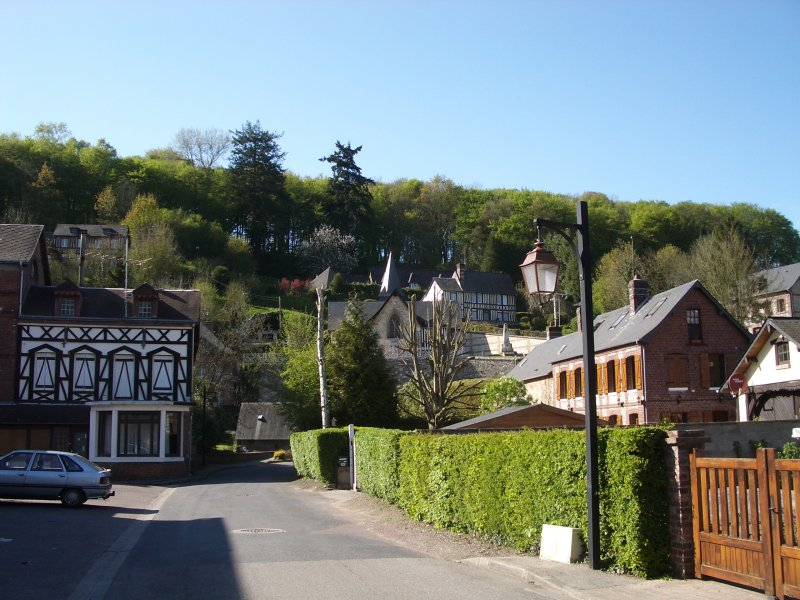
- A view within Sainte-Austreberthe

- Coat of arms
- Location of Sainte-Austreberthe
- Location within France Location within Normandy
- Coordinates: 49°35′55″N 0°58′31″E
- Country: France
- Region: Normandy
- Department: Seine-Maritime
- Arrondissement: Rouen
- Canton: Notre-Dame-de-Bondeville

Government
  - Mayor (2026–32): William Renault
- Area^{1}: 6.13 km^{2} (2.37 sq mi)
- Elevation: 85 m (279 ft)
- Highest elevation: 168 m (551 ft)
- Lowest elevation: 77 m (253 ft)
- Population (2023): 662
  - Density: 108/km^{2} (280/sq mi)
- Time zone: UTC+01:00 (CET)
  - Summer (DST): UTC+02:00 (CEST)
- INSEE/Postal code: 76566 /76570
- ^{1} French Land Register data, which excludes lakes, ponds, glaciers > 1 km^{2} (0.386 sq mi or 247 acres) and river estuaries.

Sainte-Austreberthe (French pronunciation: [sɛ̃t ɔstʁəbɛʁt]) is a commune in the Seine-Maritime department in the Normandy region in northern France.

== Geography ==
A village of farming and forestry situated by the banks of the river Austreberthe, some 14 miles (23 km) northwest of Rouen at the junction of the D22, D53 and the D103 roads.

== Heraldry ==
Arms of Sainte-Austreberthe	The arms of Sainte-Austreberthe are blazoned : Or, St. Austreberthe argent vested proper, holding a crozier sable in her left hand, a wolf ??? overlying her feet, and on a chief vert a fess wavy argent.

== Population ==
Historical population
Year	Pop.	±% p.a.
1968	416	—
1975	545	+3.93%
1982	453	−2.61%
1990	521	+1.76%
1999	583	+1.26%
2007	586	+0.06%
2012	611	+0.84%
2017	612	+0.03%
2023	662	+1.32%
Source: INSEE

== Places of interest ==
- The church of St. Austreberthe, dating from the eleventh century.
- The chateau of Langrume.
- The sixteenth-century stone cross in the cemetery.

== See also ==
- Communes of the Seine-Maritime department
