= Saint-Jean-du-Cardonnay =

- Commune
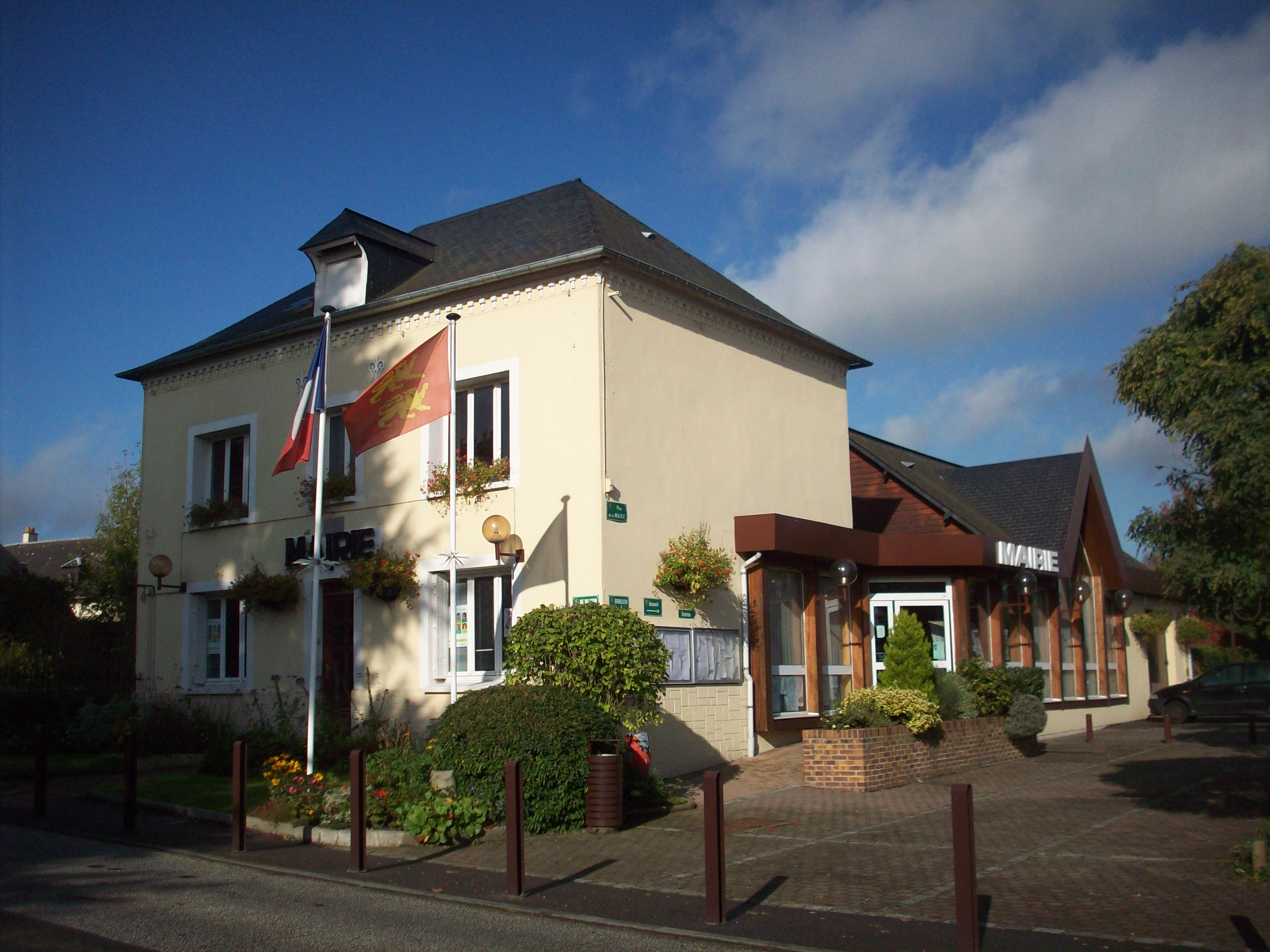
- The town hall in Saint-Jean-du-Cardonnay

- Coat of arms
- Location of Saint-Jean-du-Cardonnay
- Location within France Location within Normandy
- Coordinates: 49°30′25″N 1°00′36″E
- Country: France
- Region: Normandy
- Department: Seine-Maritime
- Arrondissement: Rouen
- Canton: Notre-Dame-de-Bondeville

Government
  - Mayor (2026–32): Jean-Luc Morisse
- Area^{1}: 7.52 km^{2} (2.90 sq mi)
- Elevation: 130 m (430 ft)
- Highest elevation: 146 m (479 ft)
- Lowest elevation: 55 m (180 ft)
- Population (2023): 1,356
  - Density: 180/km^{2} (467/sq mi)
- Time zone: UTC+01:00 (CET)
  - Summer (DST): UTC+02:00 (CEST)
- INSEE/Postal code: 76594 /76150
- ^{1} French Land Register data, which excludes lakes, ponds, glaciers > 1 km^{2} (0.386 sq mi or 247 acres) and river estuaries.

Saint-Jean-du-Cardonnay (French pronunciation: [sɛ̃ ʒɑ̃ dy kaʁdɔnɛ]) is a commune in the Seine-Maritime department in the Normandy region in northern France.

== Geography ==
A village of forestry and farming situated in the Roumois, just 7 miles (11 km) northwest of the centre of Rouen at the junction of the D90, D267 with the D6015 road.

== Population ==
Historical population
Year	Pop.	±% p.a.
1968	773	—
1975	1,015	+3.97%
1982	1,094	+1.08%
1990	1,270	+1.88%
1999	1,298	+0.24%
2007	1,345	+0.45%
2012	1,352	+0.10%
2017	1,377	+0.37%
2023	1,356	−0.26%
Source: INSEE

== Places of interest ==
- The church of St.Jean, dating from the sixteenth century.
- A seventeenth-century chateau.
- A chapel built in 1820.

== See also ==
- Communes of the Seine-Maritime department
