= Écalles-Alix =

- Commune
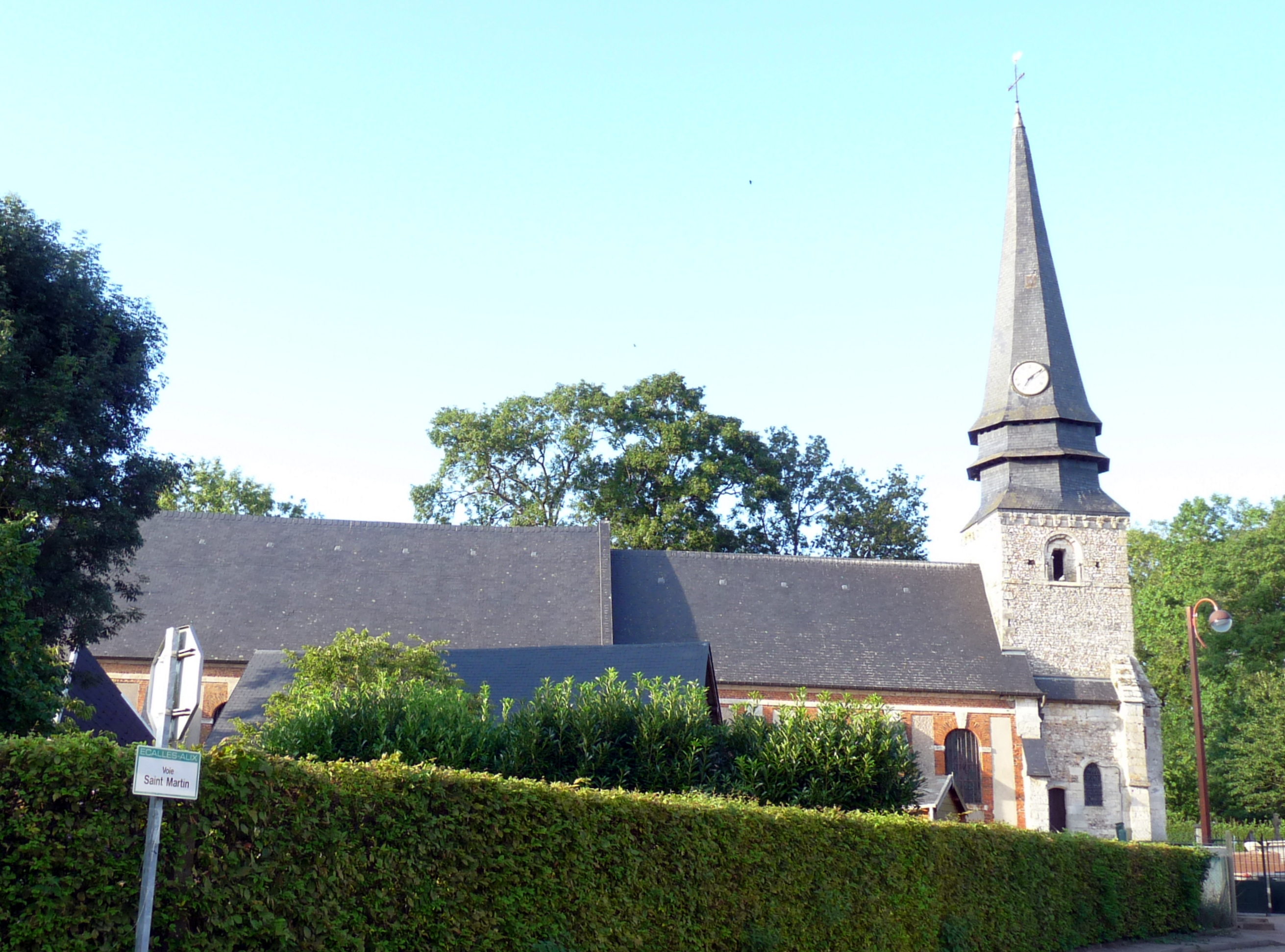
- The church in Écalles-Alix

- Coat of arms
- Location of Écalles-Alix
- Location within France Location within Normandy
- Coordinates: 49°36′59″N 0°49′31″E
- Country: France
- Region: Normandy
- Department: Seine-Maritime
- Arrondissement: Rouen
- Canton: Notre-Dame-de-Bondeville

Government
  - Mayor (2026–32): Daniel Delafenetre
- Area^{1}: 7.1 km^{2} (2.7 sq mi)
- Elevation: 135 m (443 ft)
- Highest elevation: 152 m (499 ft)
- Lowest elevation: 80 m (260 ft)
- Population (2023): 566
  - Density: 80/km^{2} (210/sq mi)
- Time zone: UTC+01:00 (CET)
  - Summer (DST): UTC+02:00 (CEST)
- INSEE/Postal code: 76223 /76190
- ^{1} French Land Register data, which excludes lakes, ponds, glaciers > 1 km^{2} (0.386 sq mi or 247 acres) and river estuaries.

Écalles-Alix (French pronunciation: [ekal aliks]) is a commune in the Seine-Maritime department in the Normandy region in northern France.

== Geography ==
A farming village situated in the Pays de Caux, some 25 miles (40 km) northwest of Rouen at the junction of the D89 with the D6015 road.

== Population ==
Historical population
Year	Pop.	±% p.a.
1968	344	—
1975	321	−0.98%
1982	339	+0.78%
1990	447	+3.52%
1999	501	+1.28%
2007	490	−0.28%
2012	507	+0.68%
2017	533	+1.01%
2023	566	+1.01%
Source: INSEE

== Places of interest ==
- The church of St. Martin, dating from the twelfth century.
- The Château de Beauvoir, built in 1638.

== See also ==
- Communes of the Seine-Maritime department
