= Fresquiennes =

- Commune
- Coat of arms
- Location of Fresquiennes
- Location within France Location within Normandy
- Coordinates: 49°33′52″N 1°00′20″E
- Country: France
- Region: Normandy
- Department: Seine-Maritime
- Arrondissement: Rouen
- Canton: Notre-Dame-de-Bondeville

Government
  - Mayor (2026–32): Nicolas Octau
- Area^{1}: 13.45 km^{2} (5.19 sq mi)
- Elevation: 131 m (430 ft)
- Highest elevation: 176 m (577 ft)
- Lowest elevation: 55 m (180 ft)
- Population (2023): 1,079
  - Density: 80.22/km^{2} (207.8/sq mi)
- Time zone: UTC+01:00 (CET)
  - Summer (DST): UTC+02:00 (CEST)
- INSEE/Postal code: 76287 /76570
- ^{1} French Land Register data, which excludes lakes, ponds, glaciers > 1 km^{2} (0.386 sq mi or 247 acres) and river estuaries.

Fresquiennes (French pronunciation: [fʁɛkjɛn], before 1995: Fresquienne) is a commune in the Seine-Maritime department in the Normandy region in northern France.

== Geography ==
A farming village situated in the Pays de Caux, some 10 miles (16 km) north of Rouen, at the junction of the D44, D504 and the D124 roads.

== Population ==
Historical population
| Year | Pop. | ±% p.a. |
|---|---|---|
| 1968 | 449 | — |
| 1975 | 560 | +3.21% |
| 1982 | 611 | +1.25% |
| 1990 | 874 | +4.58% |
| 1999 | 979 | +1.27% |
| 2007 | 1,039 | +0.75% |
| 2012 | 1,078 | +0.74% |
| 2017 | 997 | −1.55% |
| 2023 | 1,079 | +1.33% |
Source: INSEE

== Places of interest ==
- The church of St.Notre-Dame, dating from the fifteenth century.

== See also ==
- Communes of the Seine-Maritime department
