= Beautot =

- Commune
- Coat of arms
- Location of Beautot
- Location within France Location within Normandy
- Coordinates: 49°38′38″N 1°02′10″E
- Country: France
- Region: Normandy
- Department: Seine-Maritime
- Arrondissement: Dieppe
- Canton: Luneray
- Intercommunality: CC Terroir de Caux

Government
  - Mayor (2026–32): Jean-François Duclos
- Area^{1}: 3.5 km^{2} (1.4 sq mi)
- Elevation: 153 m (502 ft)
- Highest elevation: 173 m (568 ft)
- Lowest elevation: 145 m (476 ft)
- Population (2023): 156
  - Density: 45/km^{2} (120/sq mi)
- Time zone: UTC+01:00 (CET)
  - Summer (DST): UTC+02:00 (CEST)
- INSEE/Postal code: 76066 /76890
- ^{1} French Land Register data, which excludes lakes, ponds, glaciers > 1 km^{2} (0.386 sq mi or 247 acres) and river estuaries.

Beautot (French pronunciation: [boto]) is a commune in the Seine-Maritime department in the Normandy region in northern France.

== Geography ==
A small farming village situated in the Pays de Caux, some 15 miles (24 km) north of Rouen on a small road near the junction of the D927 and the D2 roads. The A29 autoroute meets the A151 autoroute within the boundaries of the commune's territory.

== Population ==
Historical population
Year	Pop.	±% p.a.
1968	121	—
1975	120	−0.12%
1982	112	−0.98%
1990	118	+0.65%
1999	106	−1.18%
2007	115	+1.02%
2012	121	+1.02%
2017	147	+3.97%
2023	156	+1.00%
Source: INSEE

== Places of interest ==
- The church of St. Andre, dating from the eighteenth century.

== See also ==
- Communes of the Seine-Maritime department
