= Croix-Mare =

- Commune
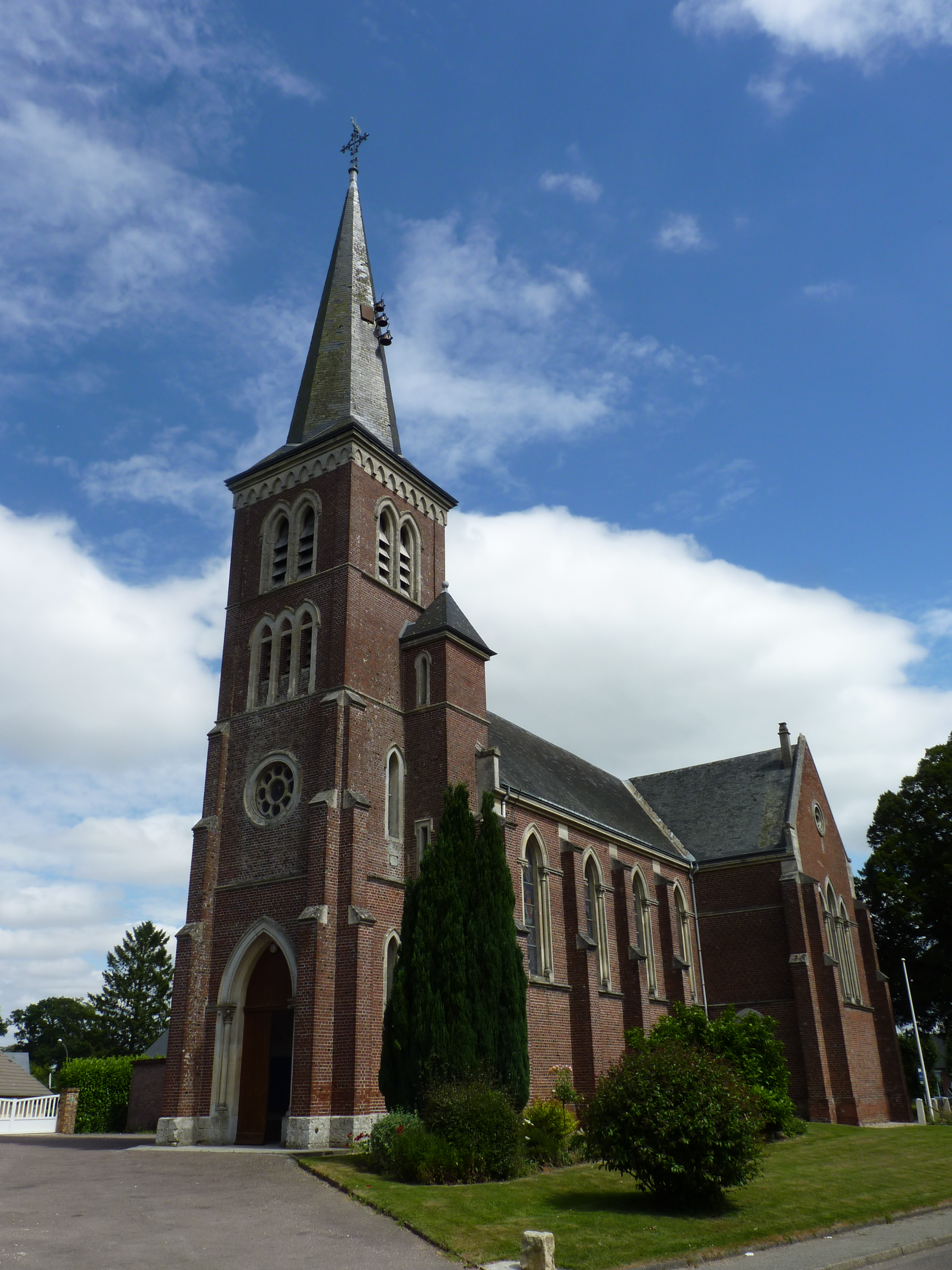
- The church in Croix-Mare
- Location of Croix-Mare
- Location within France Location within Normandy
- Coordinates: 49°36′10″N 0°51′05″E
- Country: France
- Region: Normandy
- Department: Seine-Maritime
- Arrondissement: Rouen
- Canton: Notre-Dame-de-Bondeville

Government
  - Mayor (2026–32): Eric Carpentier
- Area^{1}: 8.64 km^{2} (3.34 sq mi)
- Elevation: 156 m (512 ft)
- Highest elevation: 157 m (515 ft)
- Lowest elevation: 53 m (174 ft)
- Population (2023): 704
  - Density: 81.5/km^{2} (211/sq mi)
- Time zone: UTC+01:00 (CET)
  - Summer (DST): UTC+02:00 (CEST)
- INSEE/Postal code: 76203 /76190
- ^{1} French Land Register data, which excludes lakes, ponds, glaciers > 1 km^{2} (0.386 sq mi or 247 acres) and river estuaries.

Croix-Mare (French pronunciation: [kʁwamaʁ]) is a commune in the Seine-Maritime department in the Normandy region in northern France.

== Geography ==
A farming village situated in the Pays de Caux, some 19 miles (31 km) northwest of Rouen, at the junction of the D20, D304 and the D6015 roads.

== Population ==
Historical population
Year	Pop.	±% p.a.
1968	459	—
1975	436	−0.73%
1982	508	+2.21%
1990	591	+1.91%
1999	590	−0.02%
2007	670	+1.60%
2012	764	+2.66%
2017	803	+1.00%
2023	704	−2.17%
Source: INSEE

== Places of interest ==
- The church of St. Aubin, dating from the nineteenth century.

== See also ==
- Communes of the Seine-Maritime department
