= Pavilly =

- Commune
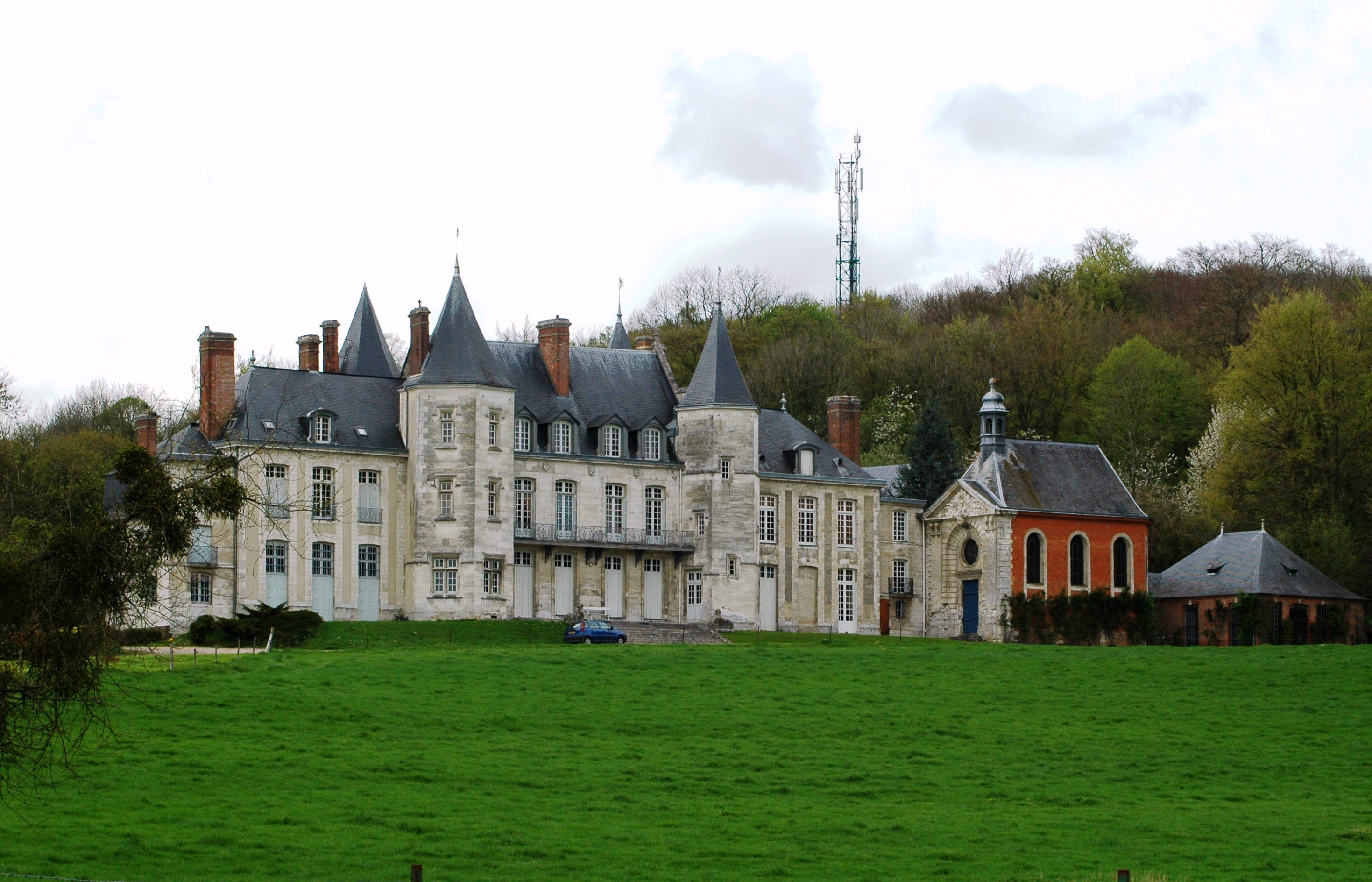
- The castle Château d'Esneval

- Coat of arms
- Location of Pavilly
- Location within France Location within Normandy
- Coordinates: 49°34′09″N 0°57′16″E
- Country: France
- Region: Normandy
- Department: Seine-Maritime
- Arrondissement: Rouen
- Canton: Notre-Dame-de-Bondeville

Government
  - Mayor (2026–32): François Tierce
- Area^{1}: 14.19 km^{2} (5.48 sq mi)
- Elevation: 102 m (335 ft)
- Highest elevation: 166 m (545 ft)
- Lowest elevation: 50 m (160 ft)
- Population (2023): 6,029
  - Density: 424.9/km^{2} (1,100/sq mi)
- Time zone: UTC+01:00 (CET)
  - Summer (DST): UTC+02:00 (CEST)
- INSEE/Postal code: 76495 /76570
- ^{1} French Land Register data, which excludes lakes, ponds, glaciers > 1 km^{2} (0.386 sq mi or 247 acres) and river estuaries.

Pavilly (French pronunciation: [paviji]) is a commune in the Seine-Maritime department in the Normandy region in northern France.

== Geography ==
The settlement of Pavilly, a town of farming and light industry, is situated by the banks of the river Austreberthe in the Pays de Caux, some 12 miles (19 km) northwest of Rouen at the junction of the D4, D142, D22 and the D67 roads.

== Heraldry ==
Arms of Pavilly	The arms of Pavilly are blazoned : Quarterly 1: Azure, a cross fleurdelysée Or; 2: Sable, a crozier reversed Or, over which a wolf couchant argent; 3: Sable, a bee argent; and 4: paly Or and azure, a chief gules.

== Population ==
Historical population
Year	Pop.	±% p.a.
1968	5,024	—
1975	5,593	+1.54%
1982	5,442	−0.39%
1990	5,729	+0.64%
1999	6,140	+0.77%
2007	6,056	−0.17%
2012	6,235	+0.58%
2017	6,308	+0.23%
2023	6,029	−0.75%
Source: INSEE

== Places of interest ==
- The church of Notre-Dame, dating from the thirteenth century.
- The chapel of Sainte Austreberthe, all that remains of the thirteenth century priory that was founded by Philibert of Jumièges.
- The fourteenth-century château Esneval, built on the foundations of a feudal castle.

== People ==
- Saint Austrebertha, born at Thérouanne (Pas-de-Calais) in 633, died at Pavilly on 10 February 704. She was the first abbess at the convent of Pavilly.

== See also ==
- Communes of the Seine-Maritime department
