= Émanville, Seine-Maritime =

Émanville
- Commune
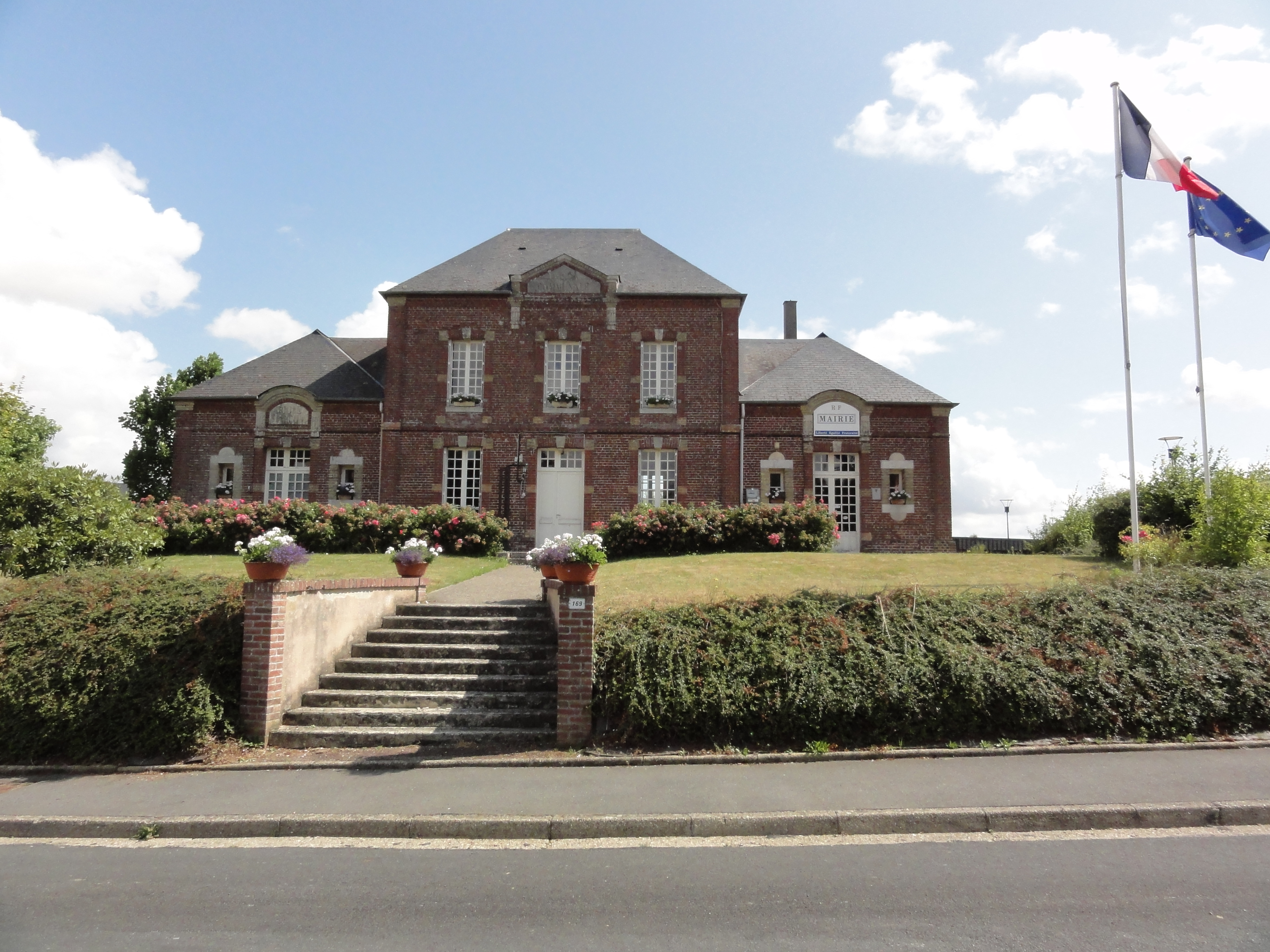
- Émanville Town hall

- Coat of arms
- Location of Émanville
- Location within France Location within Normandy
- Coordinates: 49°37′22″N 0°57′42″E
- Country: France
- Region: Normandy
- Department: Seine-Maritime
- Arrondissement: Rouen
- Canton: Notre-Dame-de-Bondeville

Government
  - Mayor (2026–32): Grégory Bellet
- Area^{1}: 6.43 km^{2} (2.48 sq mi)
- Elevation: 150 m (490 ft)
- Highest elevation: 174 m (571 ft)
- Lowest elevation: 94 m (308 ft)
- Population (2023): 791
  - Density: 123/km^{2} (319/sq mi)
- Time zone: UTC+01:00 (CET)
  - Summer (DST): UTC+02:00 (CEST)
- INSEE/Postal code: 76234 /76570
- ^{1} French Land Register data, which excludes lakes, ponds, glaciers > 1 km^{2} (0.386 sq mi or 247 acres) and river estuaries.

Émanville (French pronunciation: [emɑ̃vil]) is a commune in the Seine-Maritime department in the Normandy region in northern France.

== Geography ==
A farming village situated in the Pays de Caux, some 16 miles (26 km) north of Rouen at the junction of the D124, D63 and the D103 road.

== Population ==
Historical population
Year	Pop.	±% p.a.
1968	305	—
1975	294	−0.52%
1982	395	+4.31%
1990	455	+1.78%
1999	508	+1.23%
2007	543	+0.84%
2012	612	+2.42%
2017	707	+2.93%
2023	791	+1.89%
Source: INSEE

== Places of interest ==
- The church of St.Vaast, dating from the twelfth century.

== See also ==
- Communes of the Seine-Maritime department
