= A151 autoroute =

Road in France

A151 autoroute

Route information
- Length: 17.8 km (11.1 mi)

Major junctions
- South end: A 150 in Roumare

- E44 / A 29 in Beautot

- North end: N 27 in Varneville-Bretteville

Location
- Country: France
- Major cities: Rouen

Highway system
- Roads in France; Autoroutes; Routes nationales

The A151 autoroute is a short motorway north west of Rouen, France. It has a total length of 17.8 kilometres (11.1 mi).

== List of junctions ==
Region	Department	Junction	Destinations	Notes
Normandie	Seine-Maritime	A150 - A151	Rouen, Maromme, Canteleu	Entry and exit from Rouen
Normandie	Seine-Maritime	1 : Malaunay	Eslettes, Montville, Malaunay	
Normandie	Seine-Maritime	A29 - A151	Fécamp, Le Havre, Amiens, Calais (A28), Caen (A13)	
Normandie	Seine-Maritime	RD 2	Val-de-Saâne, Clères, Barentin, Varneville-Bretteville	
A 151 becomes N 27
1.000 mi = 1.609 km; 1.000 km = 0.621 mi
