= Butot =

- Commune
- Location of Butot
- Location within France Location within Normandy
- Coordinates: 49°36′59″N 1°01′42″E
- Country: France
- Region: Normandy
- Department: Seine-Maritime
- Arrondissement: Rouen
- Canton: Yvetot
- Intercommunality: CC Plateau de Caux

Government
  - Mayor (2026–32): Xavier Vandenbulcke
- Area^{1}: 5.51 km^{2} (2.13 sq mi)
- Elevation: 172 m (564 ft)
- Highest elevation: 182 m (597 ft)
- Lowest elevation: 155 m (509 ft)
- Population (2023): 280
  - Density: 51/km^{2} (130/sq mi)
- Time zone: UTC+01:00 (CET)
  - Summer (DST): UTC+02:00 (CEST)
- INSEE/Postal code: 76149 /76890
- ^{1} French Land Register data, which excludes lakes, ponds, glaciers > 1 km^{2} (0.386 sq mi or 247 acres) and river estuaries.

Butot (French pronunciation: [byto]) is a commune in the Seine-Maritime department in the Normandy region in northern France.

== Geography ==
A small farming village situated in the Pays de Caux some 15 miles (24 km) north of Rouen, at the junction of the D54 and the D467 roads.

== Population ==
Historical population
Year	Pop.	±% p.a.
1968	203	—
1975	177	−1.94%
1982	227	+3.62%
1990	240	+0.70%
1999	275	+1.52%
2007	282	+0.31%
2012	291	+0.63%
2017	281	−0.70%
2023	280	−0.06%
Source: INSEE

== Places of interest ==
- The church of St.Wulfran, dating from the seventeenth century.
- The chateau de Medine.
- A sixteenth-century stone cross.

== See also ==
- Communes of the Seine-Maritime department
