= Carville-la-Folletière =

- Commune
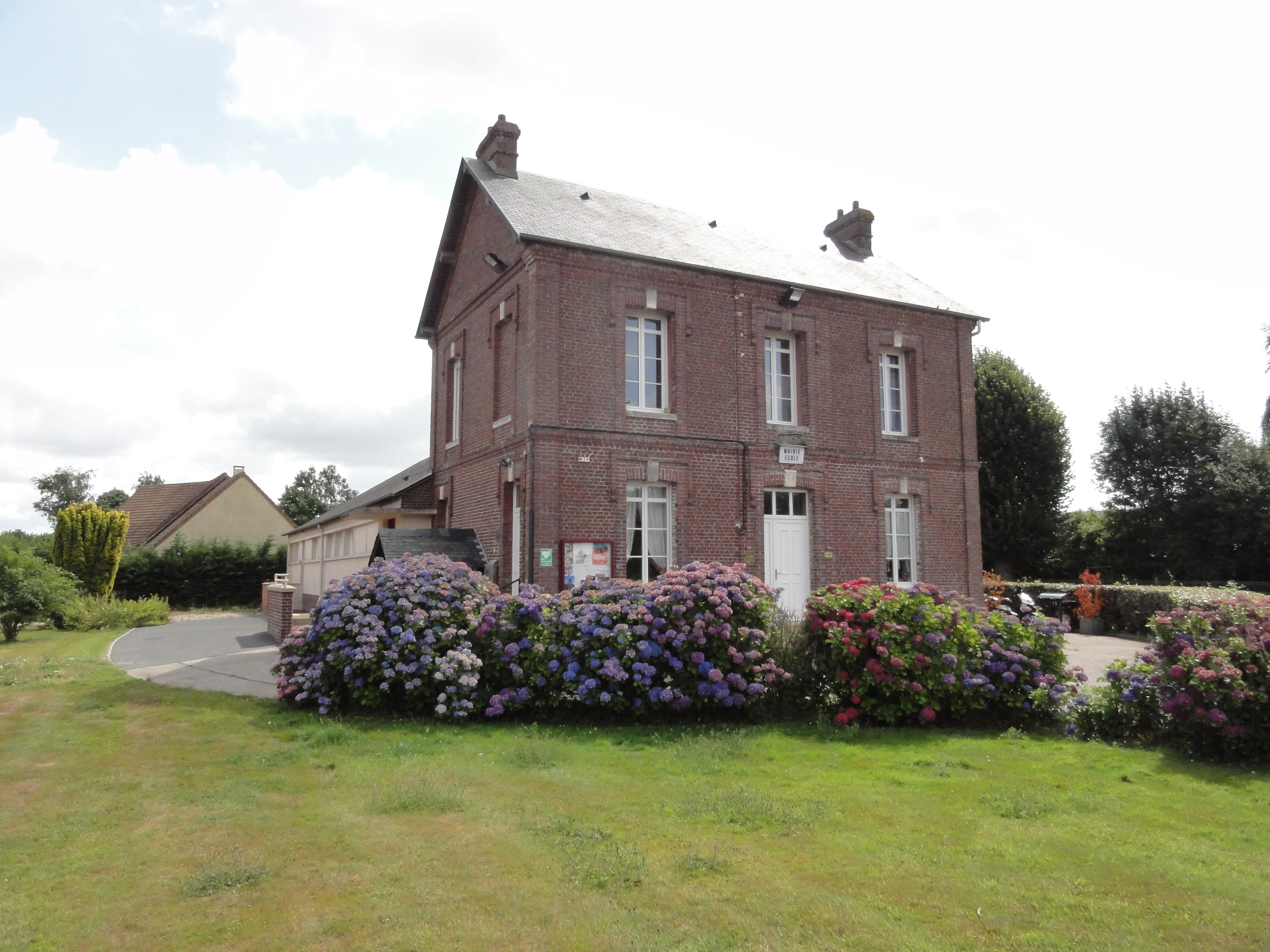
- Carville-la-Folletière Town hall
- Location of Carville-la-Folletière
- Location within France Location within Normandy
- Coordinates: 49°33′33″N 0°49′09″E
- Country: France
- Region: Normandy
- Department: Seine-Maritime
- Arrondissement: Rouen
- Canton: Notre-Dame-de-Bondeville

Government
  - Mayor (2020–2026): Jean-Louis Luc
- Area^{1}: 4.36 km^{2} (1.68 sq mi)
- Elevation: 120 m (390 ft)
- Highest elevation: 137 m (449 ft)
- Lowest elevation: 75 m (246 ft)
- Population (2023): 419
  - Density: 96.1/km^{2} (249/sq mi)
- Time zone: UTC+01:00 (CET)
  - Summer (DST): UTC+02:00 (CEST)
- INSEE/Postal code: 76160 /76190
- ^{1} French Land Register data, which excludes lakes, ponds, glaciers > 1 km^{2} (0.386 sq mi or 247 acres) and river estuaries.

Carville-la-Folletière is a commune in the Seine-Maritime department in the Normandy region in northern France.

== Geography ==
A small farming village situated in the Pays de Caux, some 18 miles (29 km) northwest of Rouen, at the junction of the D20 and the D22 roads.

== Population ==
Historical population
Year	Pop.	±% p.a.
1968	186	—
1975	207	+1.54%
1982	199	−0.56%
1990	224	+1.49%
1999	222	−0.10%
2007	330	+5.08%
2012	417	+4.79%
2017	425	+0.38%
2023	419	−0.24%
Source: INSEE

== Places of interest ==
- The church of St. Germain, dating from the thirteenth century, with a chapel.

== See also ==
- Communes of the Seine-Maritime department
