= Mesnil-Panneville =

- Commune
- Coat of arms
- Location of Mesnil-Panneville
- Location within France Location within Normandy
- Coordinates: 49°35′31″N 0°53′31″E
- Country: France
- Region: Normandy
- Department: Seine-Maritime
- Arrondissement: Rouen
- Canton: Notre-Dame-de-Bondeville

Government
  - Mayor (2026–32): Alain Lopez
- Area^{1}: 11.87 km^{2} (4.58 sq mi)
- Elevation: 120 m (390 ft)
- Highest elevation: 154 m (505 ft)
- Lowest elevation: 85 m (279 ft)
- Population (2023): 766
  - Density: 64.5/km^{2} (167/sq mi)
- Time zone: UTC+01:00 (CET)
  - Summer (DST): UTC+02:00 (CEST)
- INSEE/Postal code: 76433 /76570
- ^{1} French Land Register data, which excludes lakes, ponds, glaciers > 1 km^{2} (0.386 sq mi or 247 acres) and river estuaries.

Mesnil-Panneville (French pronunciation: [menil panvil]) is a commune in the Seine-Maritime department in the Normandy region in northern France.

== Geography ==
A farming commune made up of the main village and several hamlets, situated in the Pays de Caux, some 15 miles (24 km) northwest of Rouen at the junction of the D63, D263 and the D6015 roads.

== Population ==
Historical population
Year	Pop.	±% p.a.
1968	308	—
1975	272	−1.76%
1982	466	+7.99%
1990	492	+0.68%
1999	515	+0.51%
2007	621	+2.37%
2012	678	+1.77%
2017	719	+1.18%
2023	766	+1.06%
Source: INSEE

== Places of interest ==
- The church of Notre-Dame, dating from the nineteenth century.
- The chapel of St. Antoine, dating from the twelfth century.
- The sixteenth century chateau de Panneville.
- The Château d'Hardouville, with parts dating from feudal times.
- A sixteenth-century house with a sculpted chimney.
- The church of Notre-Dame at Durecy, dating from the nineteenth century.
- The church of St.Sulpice, dating from the thirteenth century.

== See also ==
- Communes of the Seine-Maritime department
