= Austreberthe =

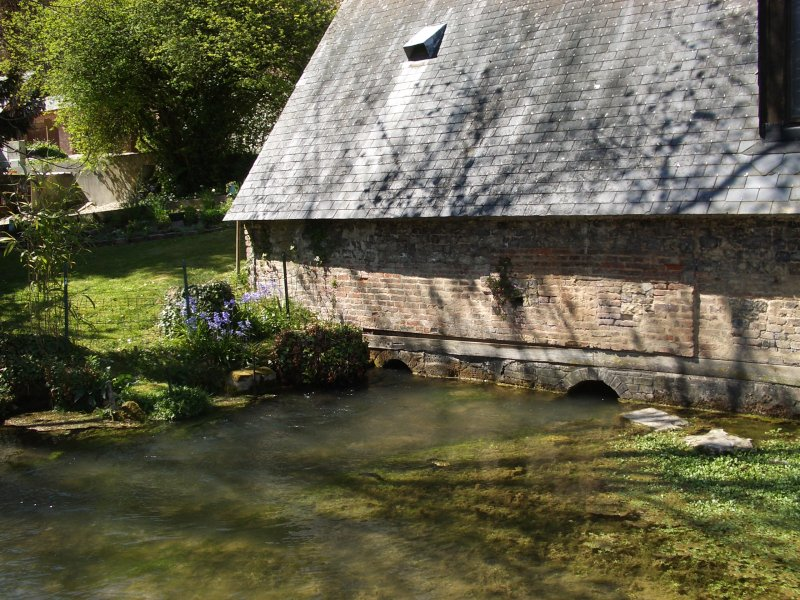
- A view of the Austreberthe

- Location within France Location within Normandy

Location
- Country: France

Physical characteristics
- Source
  - location: Normandy
- Mouth
  - location: Seine
  - coordinates: 49°28′42″N 0°52′17″E
- Length: 18 km (11 mi)

Basin features
- Progression: Seine→ English Channel

The Austreberthe (French pronunciation: [ɔstʁəbɛʁt]) is an 18-km river in the Seine-Maritime. Its source is the village of Sainte-Austreberthe. It meets the Seine at Duclair.

The Austreberthe is crossed by the Barentin Viaduct, a noteworthy 30 metre high brick railway bridge built in 1846, about 19-km from Rouen.
