= Canton of Notre-Dame-de-Bondeville =

Coordinates: 49°30′13″N 1°01′10″E

Notre-Dame-de-Bondeville
- Canton
- Country: France
- Region: Normandy
- Department: Seine-Maritime
- No. of communes: {{{nbcomm}}}
- Area: 203.22 km^{2} (78.46 sq mi)
- Population (2023): 43,277
  - Density: 212.96/km^{2} (551.55/sq mi)
- INSEE code: 76 24

The Canton of Notre-Dame-de-Bondeville is a canton situated in the Seine-Maritime département and in the Normandy region of northern France.

== Geography ==
An area of light industry, forestry and farming situated to the northwest of Rouen in the arrondissement of Rouen. The altitude varies from 8m (Roumare) to 169m (Houppeville) with an average altitude of 118m.

== Composition ==
At the French canton reorganisation which came into effect in March 2015, the canton was expanded from 9 to 24 communes (4 of which merged into the new commune Saint-Martin-de-l'If):

- Carville-la-Folletière
- Croix-Mare
- Écalles-Alix
- Émanville
- Eslettes
- Fresquiennes
- Goupillières
- Le Houlme
- Houppeville
- Limésy
- Malaunay
- Mesnil-Panneville
- Montigny
- Notre-Dame-de-Bondeville
- Pavilly
- Pissy-Pôville
- Roumare
- Sainte-Austreberthe
- Saint-Jean-du-Cardonnay
- Saint-Martin-de-l'If
- La Vaupalière

== Population ==
Historical population
Year	Pop.	±% p.a.
2013	41,605	—
2018	42,753	+0.55%
Source: INSEE

== See also ==
- Arrondissements of the Seine-Maritime department
- Cantons of the Seine-Maritime department
- Communes of the Seine-Maritime department
