= Calcutta Boys' School =

The Calcutta Boys' School

Location
- 72, S.N. Banerjee Road, Kolkata - 700014; Kolkata, West Bengal, India; 22°33′46.04″N 88°22′01.56″E

Information
- Type: Private
- Motto: Dei Mundus Deo (The World of God for God)
- Religious affiliation: Methodist Church in India
- Established: 1877; 149 years ago
- Founder: Bishop James M Thoburn
- School board: ICSE (year 10); ISC (year 12)
- Principal: Raja McGee
- Enrollment: 3000
- Classes: Nursery (4+) to 12 (ISC)
- Campus type: Urban
- Houses: Thoburn , Laidlaw , Henderson , Warne
- Song: "Hail! Alma Mater"
- Website: www.calcuttaboysschool.edu.in

The Calcutta Boys' School was founded by the Rev. James Mills Thoburn (Methodist Missionary to India, and later Missionary Bishop of the Methodist Episcopal Church), and was opened in 1877. It was endowed by Robert Laidlaw and others interested in the education of the sons of the Anglo-Indian and domiciled European community.

== History ==
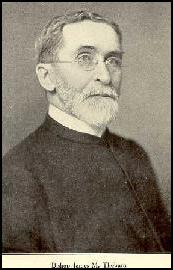
Bishop James M Thoburn

The origins of CBS are closely linked with the establishment of the Methodist Episcopal Church in India. In January 1873, the Reverend William Taylor founded the work of the Thoburn Methodist Episcopal Church in Calcutta (Kolkata). He was succeeded by the Reverend James Mills Thoburn. The latter's ardent preaching soon rendered the Entally Baptist Chapel unable to cope with the increasing number of converts. In February 1874, a new chapel was opened at 145 Dharmatala Street, built at a cost of 16,000 rupees largely due to the generosity of George Bowen of Bombay who donated 10,000 rupees. Soon even this chapel proved unable to accommodate the growing congregation, until a larger church was constructed on Dharamtolla Street, where it stands today. The New Thoburn Church was dedicated on 31 December 1875. In 1888 Rev. James Mills Thoburn was elected Missionary Bishop of India and Malaysia - the first ever Missionary Bishop in India.

It was Bishop Thoburn who founded the Calcutta Boys' School. First located at Mott Lane, and then later housed in a room on Corporation Street (known as S. N. Banerjee Road today), the school struggled for survival without a building of its own. It acquired a permanent residence in 1893 thanks to the generosity of a man who could be regarded as the chief patron of the school: Sir Robert Laidlaw, founder of the 'Whiteaway, Laidlaw & Company'.

The school has four houses named under the founder, benefactors and well-wishers; Thoburn (Red), Laidlaw (Green), Warne (Yellow) and Henderson (Blue).

During Mr. Clifford Hicks' (educationist) time as Principal & Secretary, the middle building that currently houses the CBS Chapel Hall was built. Named the 'Fritchley Building', the construction was made possible by the retirement benefit and gratuity of Mr. Horace Christopher Fritchley, former Principal (1931–1951), which he donated to "his very dear CBS" together with donations collected by the students of the school. The school library (now housed in the old Physics lab) is named "The Clifford Hicks Memorial Library". The CBS Archives (established in 2009) is housed in the old Library.

Mr. Gilbert Samuel, who became Principal in 1997, furthered the cause of co-curricular activities, allowing the students of CBS to secure top positions at premier National and International contests regularly, including a second-place finish at the 2003 Biology Olympiad and the International Informatics Olympiad in 2004. In 2005 CBS won the under-16 national cricket tournament, and in 2004 the national rounds of the Inter School Frank Antony Memorial Debate.

The school offers courses in science, commerce and humanities (started in 2019) for the students enrolling in ISC.

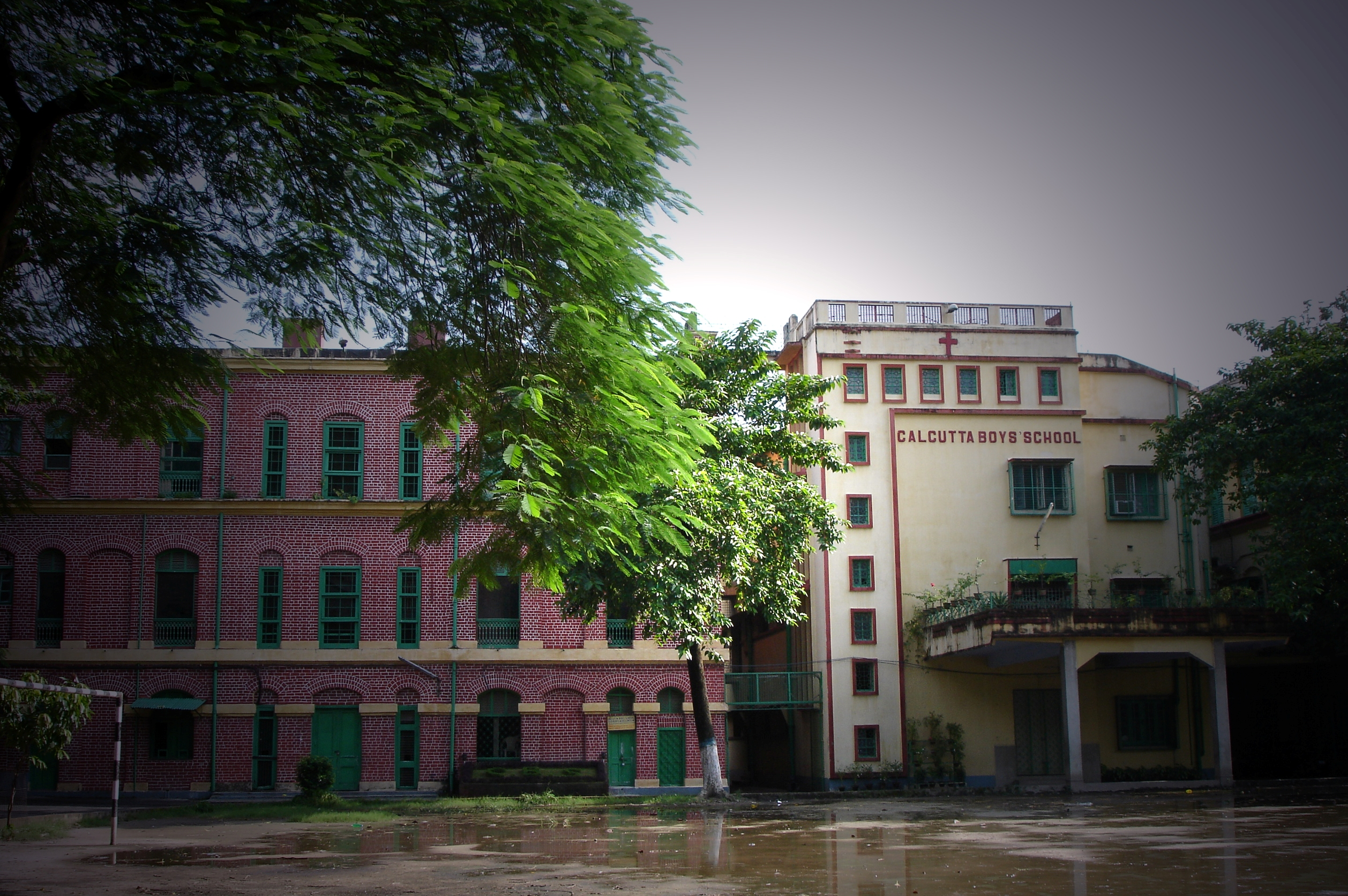
Frichley Building and Renfrew House

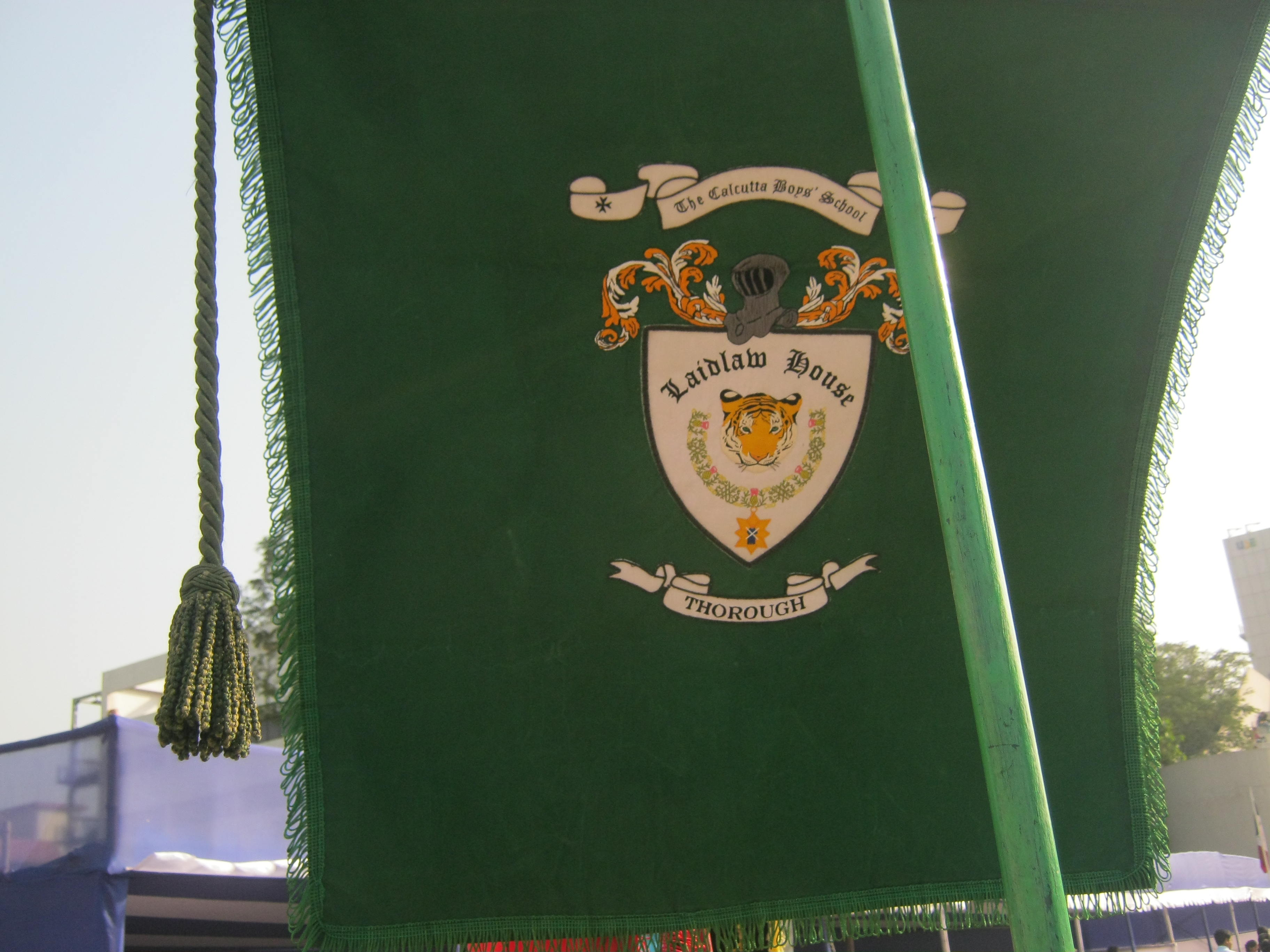
Laidlaw House's flag

== Notable alumni ==
- M. J. Akbar, Ex-Minister of State, External Affairs
- Chandrajit Banerjee, Director General - Confederation of Indian Industry
- Protik Prakash Banerjee, Indian Judge
- Sasthi Brata, Writer
- Swapan Kumar Chakravorty, former Director of National Library of India
- Purbayan Chatterjee, Sitarist
- Utpal Chatterjee, Cricketer
- Rusi Jeejeebhoy, Cricketer
- Altamas Kabir, former Chief Justice of India
- Amit Mitra, Finance Minister of West Bengal
- Rudrangshu Mukherjee, Editor, The Telegraph
- Gaurav Pandey, Filmmaker
- Ashok Som, Associate Dean, ESSEC Business School
- Benjamin Walker, Writer
- Prakash Panangaden, Professor, McGill University
- Sharadwat Mukherjee, Oncologist and Health Minister of West Bengal
- Joymalya Bagchi, Judge, Supreme Court of India

== Gallery ==
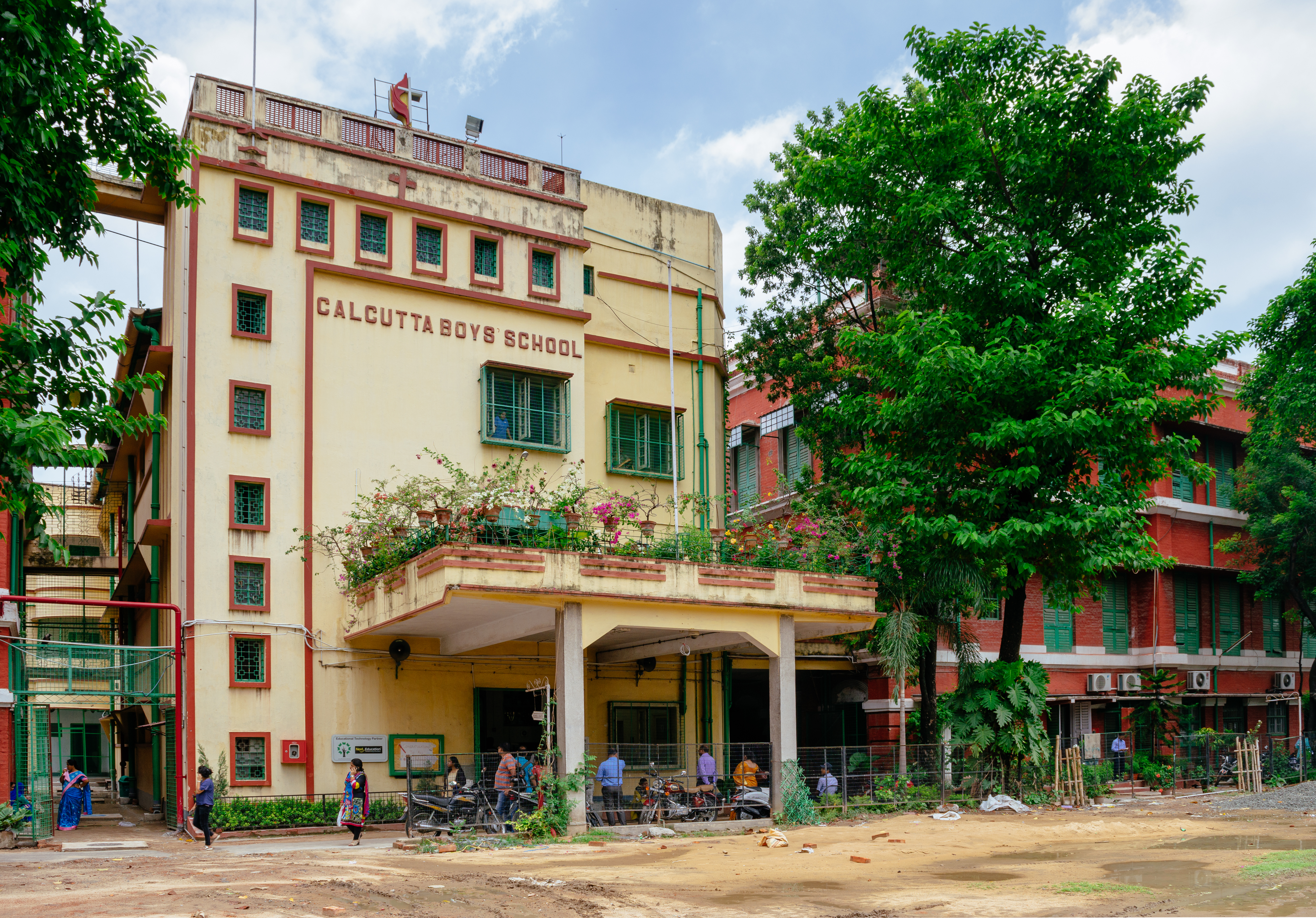

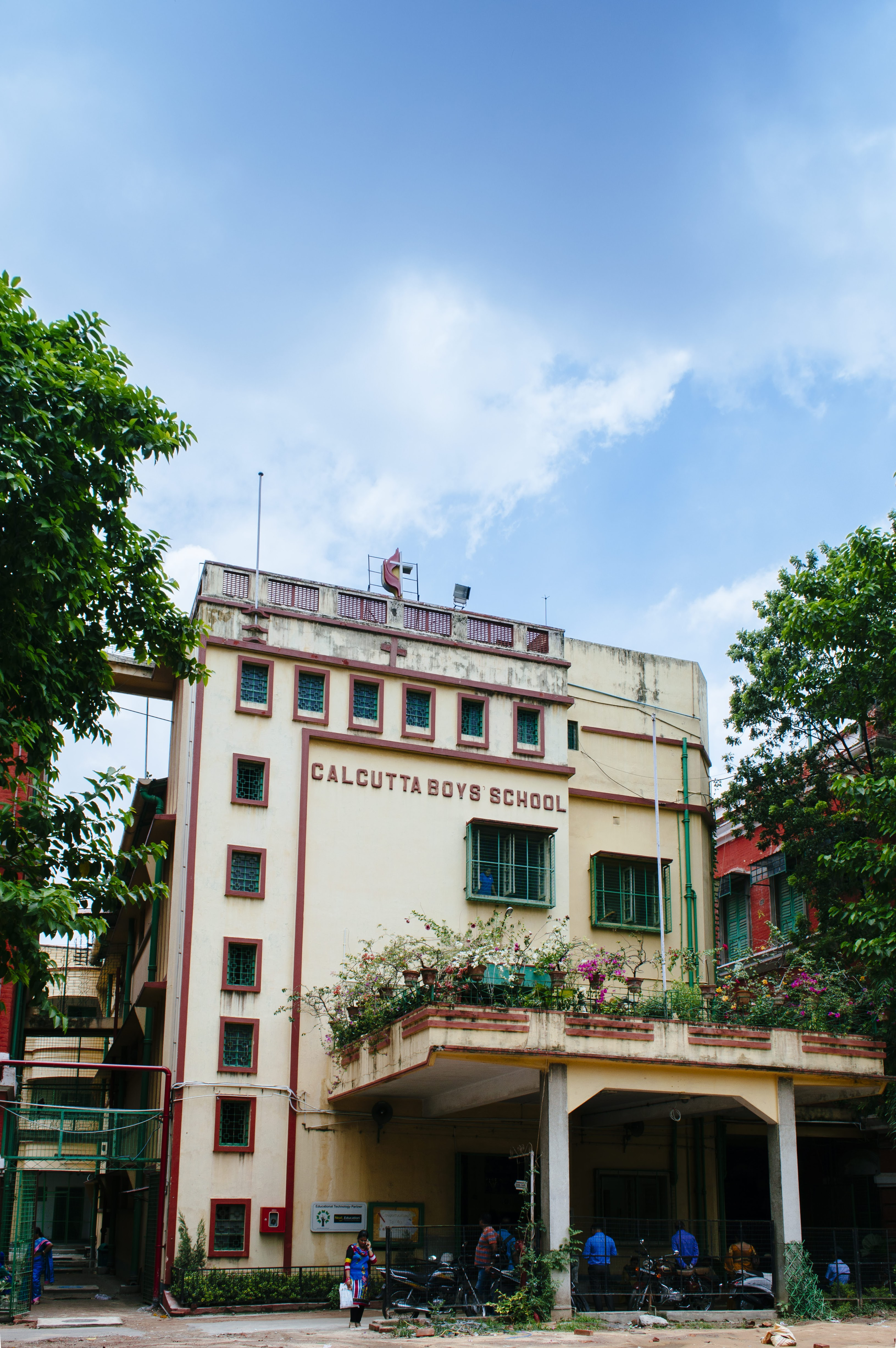

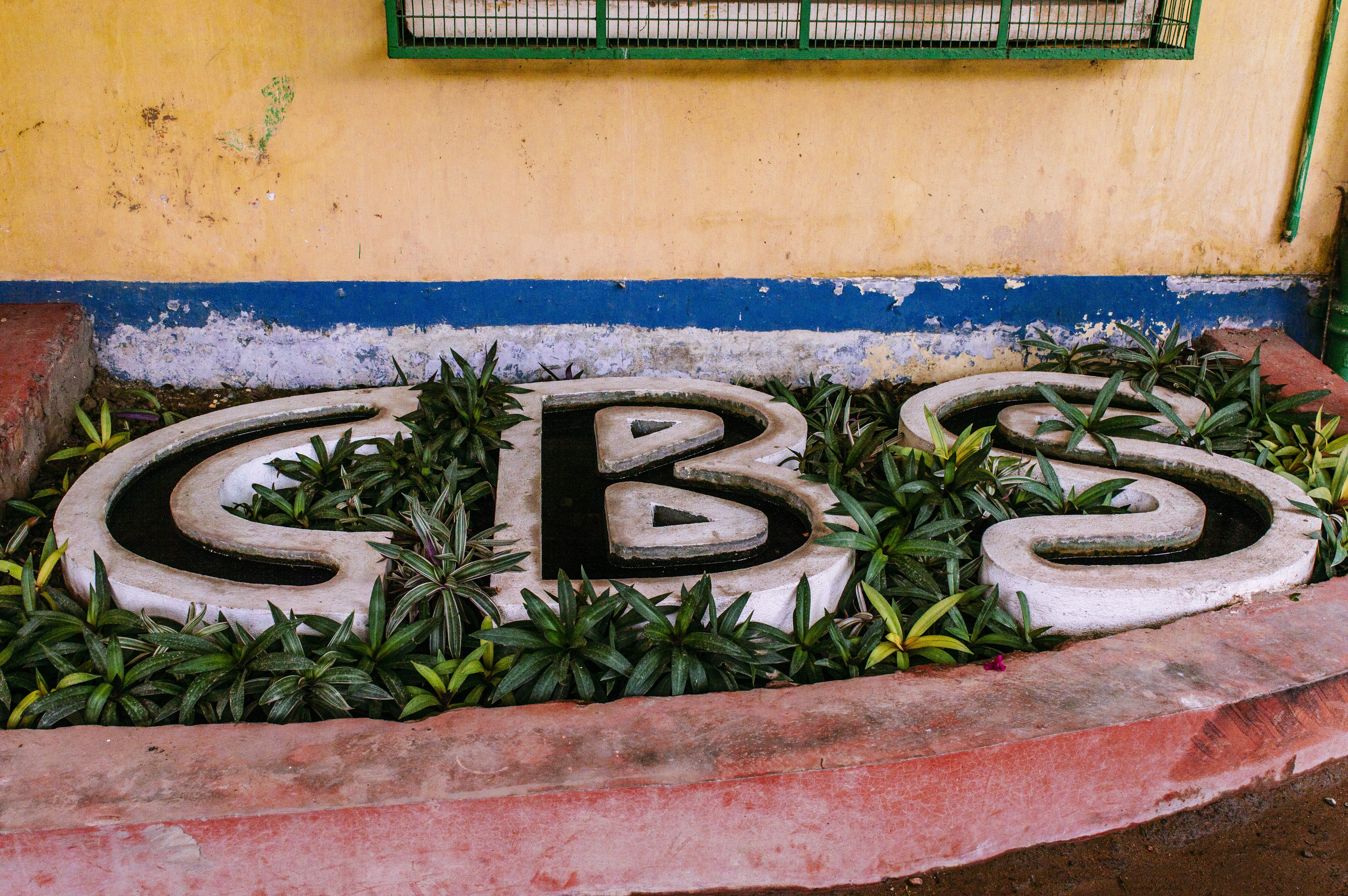

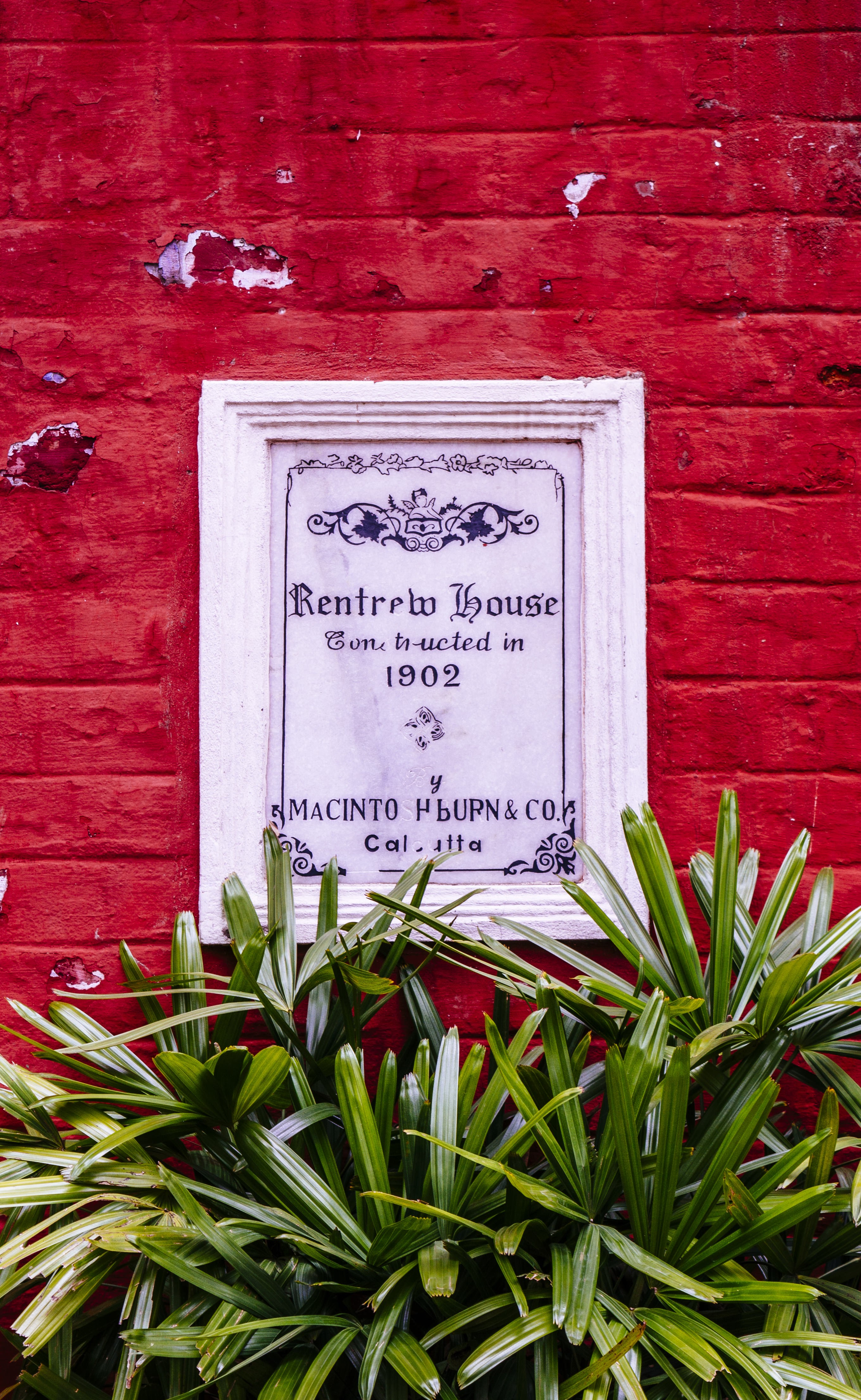

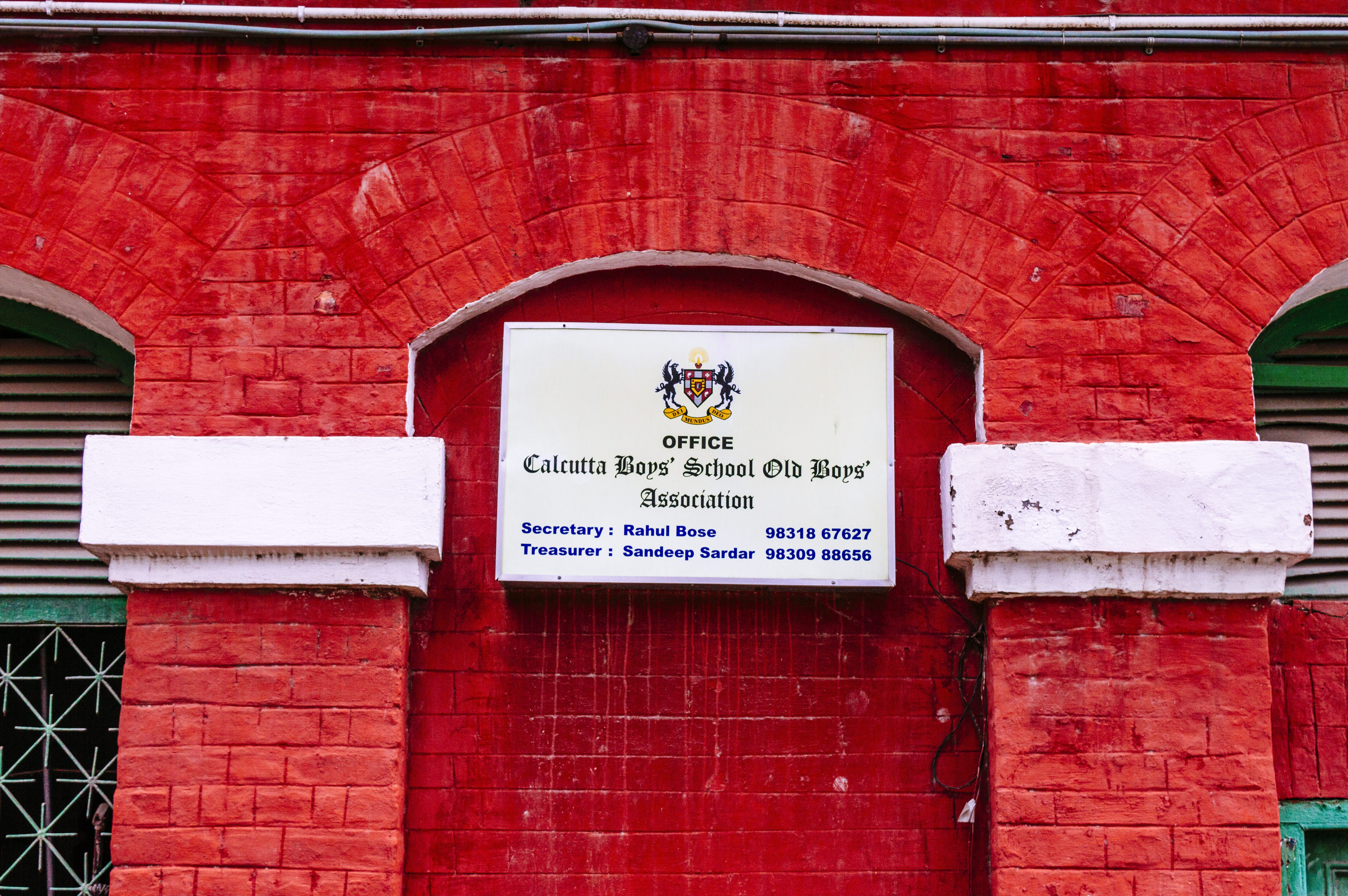

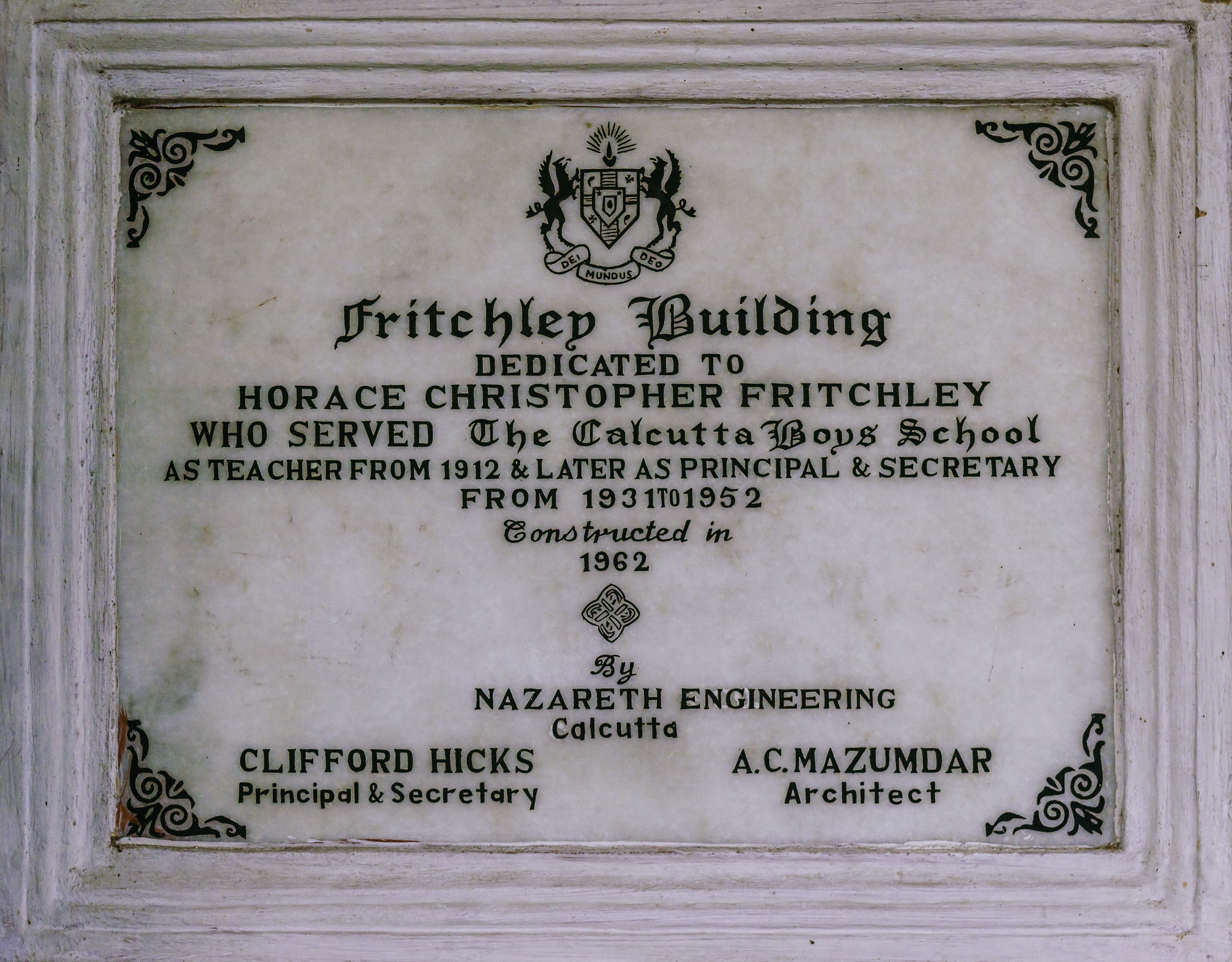

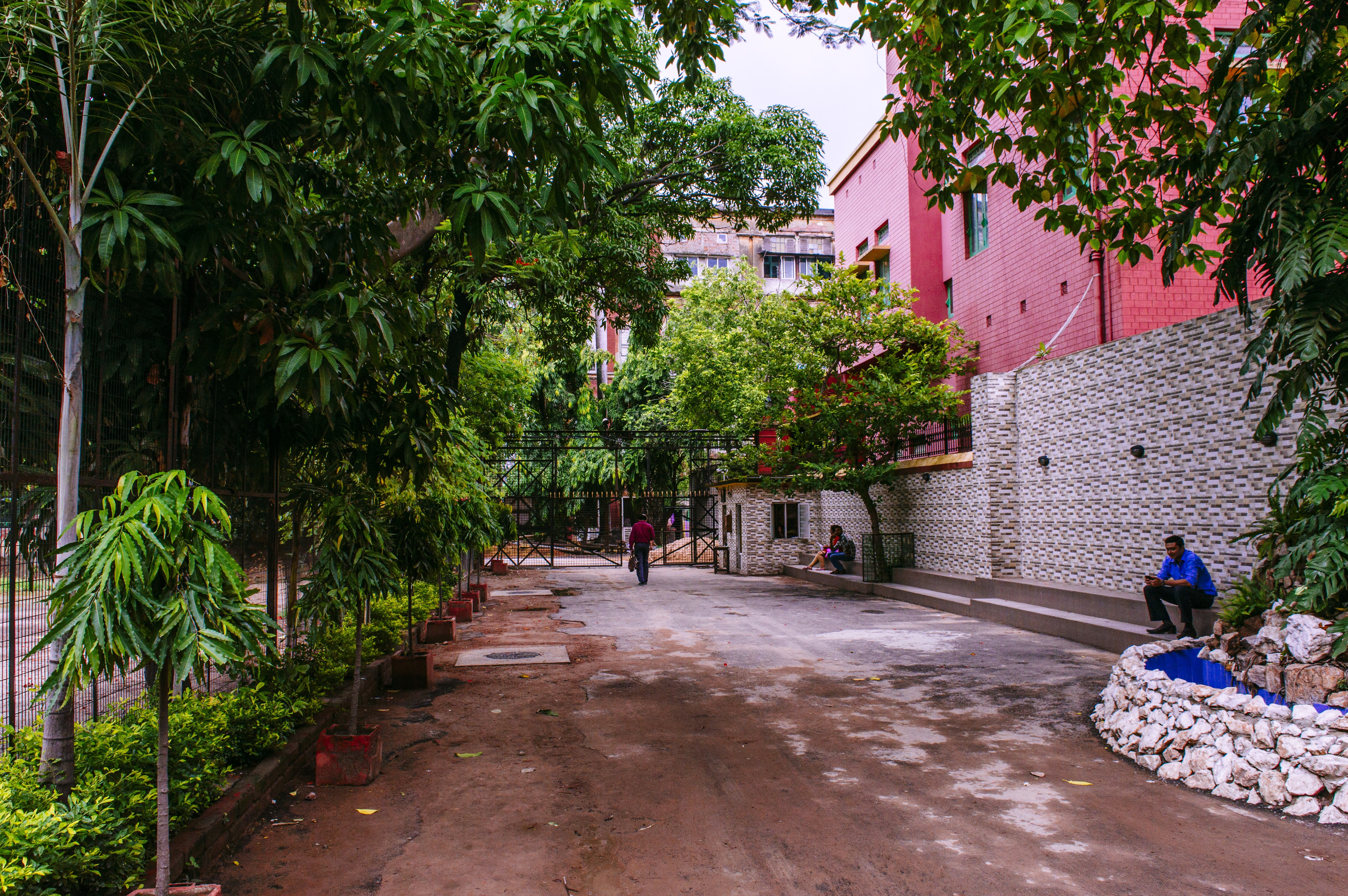
