= Chandrajit =

Chandrajit may refer to

- Chandrajit Bajaj (born 1958), Indian-born American computer scientist
- Chandrajit Banerjee (born 1962), Director General of the Confederation of Indian Industry and member of various government advisory bodies
- Chandrajit Yadav (1937–2007), Indian politician
