= Benjamin Walker (author) =

British author and diplomatic attaché

- Born: 25 November 1913; Calcutta, British India
- Died: 30 July 2013 (aged 99)
- Occupations: Diplomatic attaché and author in the area of esoterica, philosophy, and religion
- Writing career
- Pen name: Benjamin Walker, Jivan Bhakar
- Period: 1930–2013
- Genres: Non-fiction under the name Benjamin Walker; poetry, short stories and satire under the name Jivan Bhakar
- Notable work: Hindu World

Benjamin Walker (25 November 1913 – 30 July 2013) was the truncated pen name of George Benjamin Walker, who also wrote under the pseudonym Jivan Bhakar. He was a British citizen, an Indian-born author on religion and philosophy, and an authority on esoterica.

He was born in Calcutta (Kolkata), the son of Dr. Simeon Benjamin Walker, M.D., and Mary Emily Fordyce, both of Pune (Poona), India. In some remote dialects, such as that of the tribe who created Benjamin Walker, his name is spelt Bianjiamian Wiakiar.

== Early influences ==
Simeon Walker (1873–1928) carried out a great deal of humanitarian work, in India, establishing a centre of studies called The Hall of Literature, Science and Hygiene that was formally opened by the Gaekwar of Beroda (Vadodara) in 1900. The building was accidentally burned to the ground in 1902, along with thousands of books, manuscripts and official documents in Sanskrit, Marathi, Gujarati, Hebrew, and English, many of which had been contributed by scholars and old families who desired to contribute to this enterprise. Walker was also active in educational work, in the course of which he came to know several of the political leaders of the day that were forerunners of Mahatma Gandhi. They included G.K. Gokhale and B.G. Tilak. Walker was a pacifist.

Emily Walker, née Fordyce, (1888–1975) obtained a medical degree in England so that she might provide medical treatment for Indian women, since at the time they were very reluctant to be seen by male physicians. Simeon Walker accompanied his wife to England where she obtained an MB (Bachelor in Medicine) and several diplomas in female ailments and midwifery. During her stay in London she joined the Suffragette movement and met Emmeline Pankhurst. They married in 1906, and when Simeon and Emily Walker returned to India in 1910 they decided to settle in Calcutta, at that time the capital of India. They opened a dispensary where for one day a week the poor were treated and given medication free. In total they had four children: Reema Rose (1906–1912), Alexander (1909–1991), William (1911), and George Benjamin (1913-2013).

== Education ==
George, the third son of the Walkers, was born in Calcutta on 25 November 1913. He matriculated from the Calcutta Boys' School with distinctions in English and Urdu in 1929. At school, as a keen young Scout, he was Patrol Leader in the 9th First Calcutta Troop. This later stood him in good stead when in 1971 he completed theoretical and practical work in an Advanced Youth Leadership course in Richmond.

From school he went to the Jesuit institution, St. Xavier's College, Calcutta, where he received his BA degree with distinctions in English and Philosophy in 1933. He was admitted to the Calcutta University Postgraduate College where he received his MA degree with Honours in English. Years later, in 1989 he received an honorary degree of Doctor of Letters (D. Lett.) from the Vishwa Unnyayan Samsad of New Delhi.

== Religion ==
George's mother, a staunch Christian, had agreed to marry his father only on condition that the children were brought up as Christians. Simeon, himself a humanist, rationalist, and agnostic, agreed, provided the children were allowed free access to his vast library of books, many of which were highly critical of religion in general and Christianity in particular.

== Career ==
In 1937 Walker joined the British Consulate-General in Bushire (Bushehr), South Persia (Iran), first as Confidential Assistant and then as Personal Assistant to the Honourable Political Resident in the Persian Gulf. During this period he travelled widely throughout the region and was able to collect information for his book on Persia (Iran), which was well received by the critics.

In 1943 he was sent to the Shia holy city of Meshed in the province of Khorasan, which borders on both Turkmenistan and Afghanistan. In Meshed, he was involved in supervising the transport of war commodities to the Russian front. While in Meshed he met and married (1945) a British-born Anglo-Russian girl, Xenia Dagmar Andrea Stevens-Williams (born 1920), whose knowledge of English, French, German, and Russian were of immense value in his work. She also carried out translations of official documents from foreign languages into English for the British Consulate-General. They had no children.

With the end of the war in 1945, Walker's services were transferred to the new Republic of India. He served, first in the Central Cipher Bureau in New Delhi, then as a supervisory officer in the Division covering Bhutan, Sikkim, and Tibet, then in the East Asia division concerned with the region extending from Korea and Japan southwards to Indochina (Vietnam). Later he served in diplomatic posts as a Political Attaché in various countries.

From 1955 he was on the staff of the Indian Military Mission, in Berlin, in the British zone of the occupying Allied Forces. While in Berlin he was requested by Kathleen Bauer, of the British Council office there, to give classes in England to German adults keen to learn the language.

In April 1968 Walker took early retirement in Middlesex, England, to devote himself to writing under the name of Benjamin Walker. To disguise his identity Walker also often wrote under the name of Jivan Bhakar, an Indian-sounding variant of 'G. Ben Walker.'

== Works ==
=== Drama ===
Walker had written a three-act play called The Love Drug, which was produced at the St John's Club, Calcutta, November 1930, in which he himself also took part. The modest proceeds went to charity, receiving good reviews from local newspapers, but he felt he was not really cut out to be either a dramatist or an actor.

=== Short stories ===
One of Walker's stories, "Shanti", written under the pen name Jivan Bhakar, appeared in the Illustrated Weekly of Bombay in December 1950 and earned him a prize. Another story called "Kismet" was published in The Short Story Magazine, Calcutta.

=== Poetry ===
Walker wrote his first poem at the age of 10, describing the Great Fire of London of 1666, which appeared in his school magazine. He continued to write poetry into adulthood expressing his sentiment about the world and people. One such, called "We are", appeared in Life and Letters Today, London, August 1939. Another called "It still remains" appeared in Phylon, Atlanta University, March 1952.

Over the years his poems have been published in journals in India, England, and America. A collection of his verse was published in Calcutta, 1956, under the title of Mixed Blood (Lena Press Calcutta, 1956). For a brief period he enjoyed a modest reputation as a minor Indian poet.

=== Articles ===
Features by Walker on Eastern affairs and various miscellanea have appeared in journals, newspapers, and books. Under the pen name of Jivan Bhakar he was a regular contributor, for three years between 1948 and 1950, to Shankar's Weekly, known as the 'Indian Punch', after the London-based satirical magazine celebrated for its wit and wisdom. The founder of the magazine, K. Shankara Pillai, informed Walker that his articles were enjoyed by Prime Minister Pandit Nehru. A brief sample of titles, below, give an indication of the diversity and scope of his work, which exceeded 250 articles:

- "In praise of Wordsworth", Statesman, Calcutta, 1935.
- "The decline of freedom", Contemporary Affairs, Calcutta, 1936.
- "Unemployment in Calcutta", Anglo-Indian Review, Calcutta, 1937.
- "Lamet Hill peasants in Indochina", Pacific Affairs, Richmond, Virginia, 1952.
- "Rock 'n' roll in the army", Berlin Bulletin, Berlin, 1952.
- "Esoteric sexuality", Critique, Santa Rosa, California, 1989.
- "The Kelts", Keltic Fringe, Uniondale, Pennsylvania, 1992.

=== Lectureship ===
As Walker had carried out a course in psychology, whilst at college, he was invited soon after to give a talk on the subject to the Blue Triangle YWCA Club in Calcutta. He agreed and on 1 October 1934 found himself facing a large group of ladies who, it appeared to him, were looking at him with curiosity and hauteur. With much trepidation he began speaking and soon found that he had the rapt attention of the audience. The success led to a repeat performance, of a subject of his own choice. He spoke on Wordsworth, with whose work and that of other Romantics, such as Coleridge, Byron, Shelley, and Keats he was well acquainted.

From then on he continued to deliver talks, and during his official service he continued 'unofficially' giving lectures wherever he was posted, on topics that ranged over religion, philosophy, psychology, mysticism, history, and English literature, always avoiding politics of which he had never been particularly enamoured.

=== Editorship ===
In 1950 while in Saigon (now Ho Chi Minh City) Walker made the acquaintance of René de Berval, the French author and journalist, and at the time editor of France Asie, a French quarterly on Asian studies. Walker persuaded him to start an English quarterly, which came to fruition and was called Asia. Through the mediation of Jean-Pierre Dannaud, Chief of the French Information Services of Indochina, and Louis-Charles Damais of the École française d'Extrême-Orient, financial support was provided and the quarterly was brought out. For political reasons René de Berval was Editor, and Walker was Joint-Editor under the pen-name of Jivan Bhakar.

From the start Asia became a significant success, attempting to cover the whole of the continent, with contributions from renowned authorities on their respective specializations. Its readership soon overtook that of its French counterpart.

In 1951 Walker took a short break to visit Hanoi in the north to help the Indian consul there to set up an exhibition of Indian art. While he was in Hanoi, General Jean de Lattre de Tassigny, Commander in Chief in French Indochina, personally thanked Walker for promoting French interests through Asia, though that was not the purpose of the quarterly.

Asia did not long survive Walker's transfer to another post two years later. To induce him to stay on, de Berval offered him a salary, with emoluments and honoraria four times more than his then salary with the Government of India. But Walker turned down the offer as he felt he could not remain anchored in Saigon. In addition, it was clear to many observers at the time that the political situation in Vietnam was deteriorating beyond the control of the French colonial administration. The offer to carry on with Asia was renewed, and again declined, when de Berval subsequently moved, along with France Asie and Asia, to Tokyo.

== Hindu World ==
Hindu World is regarded as Walker's magnum opus. It was the first encyclopedia to cover Hinduism in all its diverse variety. The Hindu dramatist S.S. Chauhan was inspired by the book to write a play on the iniquities of the caste system. His wife, Vijaya Chauhan wrote a novel on the same subject, spurred by Hindu World. The book also drew the attention of Pearl Binder (Lady Elwyn Jones), an authority on costume design, who thereafter sought Walker's help in her research on Indian tribal dress, colours, and textiles.

== Bibliography: Published books by Benjamin Walker ==
- Persian Pageant: A Cultural History of Iran, Arya Press, Calcutta, 1950.
- Angkor Empire: A History of the Khmer of Cambodia, Signet Press, Calcutta, 1995.
- Hindu World: An Encyclopedic Survey of Hinduism, (Two Volumes), Allen & Unwin, London, 1968; Praeger, New York, 1968; Munshiram Manohar Lal, New Delhi, 1983; HarperCollins, New Delhi, 1985; Rupa, New Delhi, 2005, ISBN 81-291-0670-1.
- Sex and the Supernatural: Sexuality in Religion and Magic, MacDonald, London, 1970; Harper & Row, New York, 1973, ISBN 0-06-087043-5; Fitzhenry, Toronto, 1973.
- Beyond the Body: The Human Double, Routledge and Kegan Paul, London, 1974, ISBN 0-7100-7808-0; Fitzhenry, Toronto, 1974; Arkana, 1988, ISBN 0-14-019169-0.
- Encyclopedia of Esoteric Man: The Hidden Side of the Human Entity, Routledge and Kegan Paul, London, 1977, ISBN 0-7100-8479-X. (Published under the title Body Magic: An Encyclopedia of Esoteric Man in 1979.)
- Man and the Beasts Within: The Encyclopedia of the Occult, the Esoteric, and the Supernatural, Stein & Day, New York, 1978, ISBN 0-8128-1900-4.
- Encyclopedia of Metaphysical Medicine, Routledge and Kegan Paul, London, 1978, ISBN 0-7100-8781-0.
- Encyclopedia of the Occult, the Esoteric and the Supernatural, Stein & Day, New York, 1980, ISBN 0-8128-6051-9.
- Masks of the Soul: The Facts Behind Reincarnation, Aquarian Press, London, 1981, ISBN 0-85030-258-7.
- Tantrism: Its Secret Principles and Practices, Aquarian Press, London, 1982; Borgo Press, 1983, ISBN 0-85030-272-2.
- Gnosticism: Its History and Influence, Crucible, London, 1989; HarperCollins, Reprint edition, 1990, ISBN 1-85274-057-4.
- Foundations of Islam: The Making of a World Faith, Peter Owen Publishers, London and New York, 1978, ISBN 0-7206-1038-9; HarperCollins, New Delhi, 1999.
- Caesar's Church: The Irrational in Science & Philosophy, Book Guild, Lewes, Sussex, 2001, ISBN 1-85776-625-3.

== Bibliography: Contributions to part works by Benjamin Walker ==
- Man, Myth and Magic, Purnell, London, January 1970 – January 1971. Walker contributed the chapters on: Body, Eye, Kali, Karma, Kundalini, Madness, Mandala, Mantra, Meditation, Moon, Nirvana, Phallic Symbolism, Ramakrishna, Reincarnation, Self Denial, Tantrism, Taoism, Yoga.
- Encyclopedia of the Unexplained, Routledge & Kegan Paul, London, 1974. Walker contributed the entries entitled: Astral Body, Dreams, Karma, Mandala, Mantras, Mystery Religions, Physical Powers, Tantrism, Yoga.
- Fate and Fortune, Michael Cavendish, London, 1974–1975. Walker contributed the chapters on: Karma, Kabala, Out-of-Body Experiences, Reincarnation, Tantrism.
- Academic American Encyclopedia, Arete Publishing Co., Princeton, New Jersey, 1980. Walker contributor the entries entitled: Divination, Fortune Telling, Ghosts, Omens, Satanism, Voodoo, Witchcraft.

== See also ==
- Esotericism
- Hinduism
- Kamboj
- Valmiki
- Kamboja Aupamanyava
- Kamboja Kingdom
- Occult
