= Sasthi Brata =

British–Indian fiction writer (1939–2015)

Sasthibrata Chakravarti
- Born: 1939
- Died: 2015 (aged 75–76)
- Education: Calcutta Boys' School, Presidency College (Physics)
- Occupation: Writer
- Writing career
- Genres: Fiction, short stories, poetry, memoir, travel
- Notable work: Confessions of an Indian Woman Eater

Sasthibrata Chakravarti (1939–2015), known as Sasthi Brata, was a British-Indian Indo-Anglian writer of fiction. He is best known for his best selling novel Confessions of an Indian Woman Eater.

== Early life and education ==
Sasthibrata was educated at Calcutta Boys' School, Kolkata and then at Presidency College, Kolkata, where he studied Physics. After finishing college education he left India and spent his adult life in Europe and America.

== Post literary career ==
Sasthibrata lived a checkered life. After his literary career, he had worked as a salesman for air conditioners, a lavatory attendant, a postman, a kitchen porter, to supplement his pension. He died in 2015 at the age of 75.

== Works ==
=== Novels ===
- 1971. Confessions of an Indian Woman Eater
- 1973. She and He
- 1980. The Sensuous Guru: The Making of a Mystic President

=== Short stories ===
- 1978. Encounter

=== Poetry ===
- 1960. Eleven Poems

=== Memoir and Autobiography ===
- 1968. My God Died Young
- 1975. A Search for Home
- 1976. Traitor to India: A Search for Home

=== Travel ===
- 1985 Labyrinths in the Lotus Land
- 1986 India: The Perpetual Paradox
