= Château du Bosc Théroulde =

Château in Normandy, France

Coordinates: 49°33′13″N 1°7′53″E

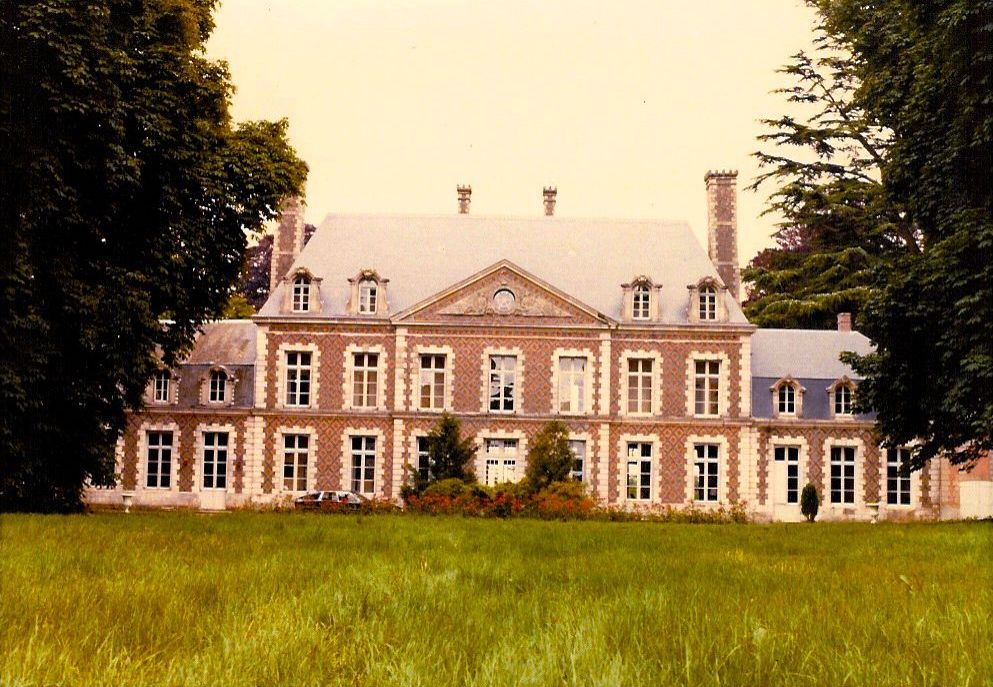
Château du Bosc Théroulde

The Château du Bosc Théroulde is a château built in the 17th century near Bosc-Guérard-Saint-Adrien in the Seine-Maritime département of Normandy, France.

== Name origin ==
Bosc is an old French word meaning bois (wood), deriving from the Germanic bosk which is related to the Latin boscus. The same word occurs in Norman. It can be found in many place names and surnames.

and

Théroulde from Thorold/Thorald, or in Latin Turoldus, comes from a forename of Scandinavian origin - Thorold (coming in turn from Thorvaldr (meaning 'ruled by Thor'). The name arrived in Normandy with the Vikings, and was very popular there from the 10th to the 12th centuries. It is also the origin of many surnames: Théroulde, Théroude, Touroude, Troude and Throude. These names are mainly found in the Pays de Caux, the Roumois and the Cotentin, where the Scandinavian settlements were strongest. Several placenames exclusively found in Normandy come from this same origin: probably all the Trouville, Bourgtheroulde, Thérouldeville, Turretot, etc. place names are related. The surname is also very common in the Channel Island of Guernsey, spelt variously as above and currently as Torode.

== History through Families ==
=== du Bosc de Tendos ===
Until the 12th Century, the land of Bosc Theroulde consisted of 6 to 8 houses and was part of the land of the baronnerie de Fontaine le Bourg, under the title of fief Alinette, huitieme de fief.

=== Cormeilles ===
From 1512 the estate belonged to the Cormeille family and until the 16th century.

=== Le Faë ===
In 1598, Jacques Le Faë (d. ca. 1630), Adviser to the King, 'Controleur general des traites dominilales et impots en la province de Normandie', acquires the Alinette domaine from the Cormeilles Family on the 6th of April. He builds the present Château Louis de XIII style in bricks, works will only start in 1616 (exchange of contract only on 14 May 1607) and will be completed in 1632. (The inscription 1616 can be found on one of the main chimneys.) He married Anne Petit, then died in 1630, and the estate is ruled by his wife on behalf of her nobles children until 1637. Adrien (d. ca. 1669) Le Fae Sieur de Bosc Theroulde, Adviser to the king, 'Maitre en sa Chanmbre de Normandie', inherited the Estate and was made escuyer in 1640. He built the chapel (1646–1648) along the Chateau, named after his patron saint, after being saved from the plague of Rouen (in 1637 in Rouen 11,000 people died in 10 months). Christophe Charles Le Faë (died 28 March 1707), Lord of Bosc Theroulde, Saint Germain, Mêtillon, La Mivoie and other places, adviser to the Parliament of Rouen, appointed on 3 March 1670, succeeded to Adrien and married Madeleine Le Roux (died 8 May 1719). A stone shield located on the west wing represents their respective merged family shields.

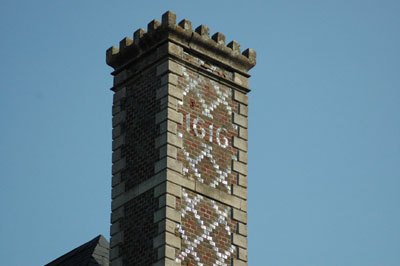
Date

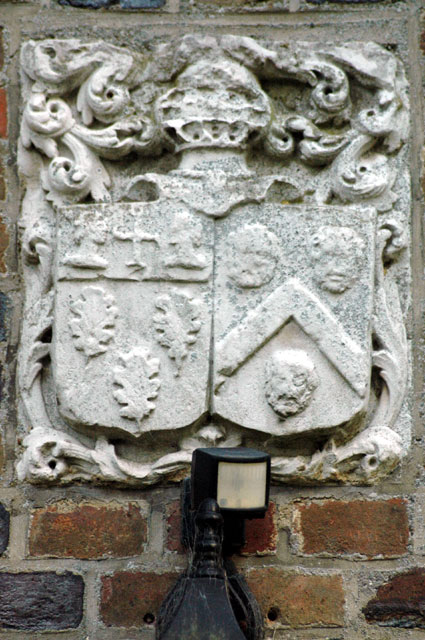
Shield

They had one son, Francois Louis, and two daughters. One became a Benedictine nun in the Saint-Sacrement convent and the other inherited the Estate. Francois Louis Lord of Bosc Theroulde, advisor to the chamber of Roeun, died young on 24 September 1716 without heir.

=== Langlois de Colmoulins ===
Marie Elisabeth Louise Le Fae de Bosc Theroulde brought le Bosc Théroulde in dowry when marrying Claude Emmanuel Langlois de Colmoulins, first Advisor to the King and in 1707 President of the Parlement of Rouen. They had no children.

=== de Berthost ===
Louis Pierre François René de Berthost (died 2 January 1776), Lord de Caudecoste, du Mesnil, de Saint-Germain and du Bosc Théroulde inherited through his wife, born Le Fae, the estate in 1753. He rebuilt the Chateau and acquired on 12 March 1782 most of the land that would form the estate of le Bosc Théroulde; the additional land he received by inheritance. He married Marie Anne Laudasse de Francamp, du Varat, and they had two children. One of his grandsons, Charles de Berthost de Bosc Théroulde, was at the Bailliage of Rouen in 1789 during the French Revolution and did not survive.

Louis Francois Rene de Berthost du Bosc theroulde (died 23 December 1814) inherited the estate. He was condemned by the King following the decree of 3 November 1788. The king released him of all condemnation in 1789. He spent the French revolution in the Chateau.

Louis Armand de Berthost de Saint Germain and other places (died 1825), inherited the estate and married Julie Adelaide Jeanne Haillet, daughter of Lord of Petit and Grand Couronne. Louis Armand enlarged the estate by purchasing lands. He died 30 April 1825, without heir. He was a gambler and died covered in debts. His niece, Miss de Milleville, took over the estate without knowing when she accepted the inheritance.

Julie Adelaïde Jeanne Haillet remarried Jean Louis Huger de Bracquecourt de St Vincent. They had one daughter, Aglaé Patronille Huger. Julie Adelaïde Jeanne Haillet remarried a third time to Capitaine d'état Majot Félix Augier de Moussac.

=== de Milleville ===
Louis Octave de Milleville (1774–1851), Chevalier of the Order of Saint Louis, married Aglaé Patronille Huger de Bracquemont in 1805 and brought in dowry the Estate of Bosc Théroulde.

Louis Octave de Milleville had one son Marie-Adrien Octave and a daughter.

Marie-Adrien Octave Milleville (1812–1885) sold the estate to Charles Sénateur Maze-Sensier on 13 August 1845.

=== Maze-Sensier ===
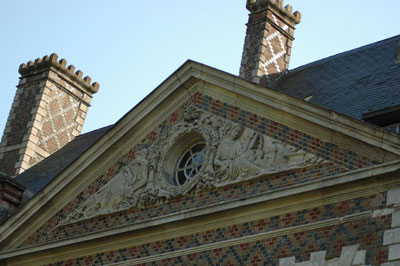
Frontons Sud

Chales Sénateur Maze-Sensier (1797–1863)

From the estate built by de Berthost, which was over 491 hectares in size, Chales Sénateur Maze purchased 246 hectares including the Château, the farm from the Château, and five other farms.

The Château was at its most glorious, 'pediments' were added on both sides and a layer of coloured varnished baked bricks with stones were added on the aging original bricks of St Jean. The four letters M A Z E were engraved in the stonework surrounding the upper windows.

=== Daniel Serruys ===
Daniel Jean Louis Alphonse Marie Serruys (1875–1950) born in Belgium.

- Friend of Minister Paul Van Zeeland, son in law of Winston Churchill
- Appointed to negotiate the economic measures of peace during World War I

Winston Churchill met Daniel Serruys at the Château du Bosc Théroulde to discuss the post war economic conditions.

=== de Becq de Fouquière ===
Augustin Pierre de Fouquière (1868–1960), Ministre plénipotentiaire purchased the estate in 1936. He didn't keep the estate very long. He exploited the woods for timber and sold part of the land.

=== Morel ===
He was a gentleman farmer, used all the buildings and estate for farming.

=== Dannaud ===
Jean-Pierre Dannaud (1921–1995), Conseiller d'état since 1966 purchased the estate in 1959.

=== Souham ===
Glenn Souham (1952–1986) was a businessman with worldwide interests in real estate, oil and consulting services. Mr. Souham was also Special Advisor to President Reagan's Advisory Council on Private Sector Initiatives, and an investment advisor to various groups around the world. He also served as a special trade advisor to Governor James Thompson of Illinois. Glenn Souham held a degree in public affairs, government affairs and public relations from the University of Paris. Glenn was a member of The French Institute of International Relations (Paris) and the International Institute for Strategic Studies (London).

His spouse was Dayle Haddon, a top model for L'Oréal.

…/… We are especially proud to have Glenn’s support with our private sectors initiatives programs. The assistance like Glenn and yourselves has helped make these programs a success. You can be sure that Glenn’s spirit of compassion, cooperation, and commitment will long be remembered by all who knew him. May God bless you and keep you Sincerely Ronald Reagan

To : Mr. And Mrs Gérard Souham (See scan of full document)

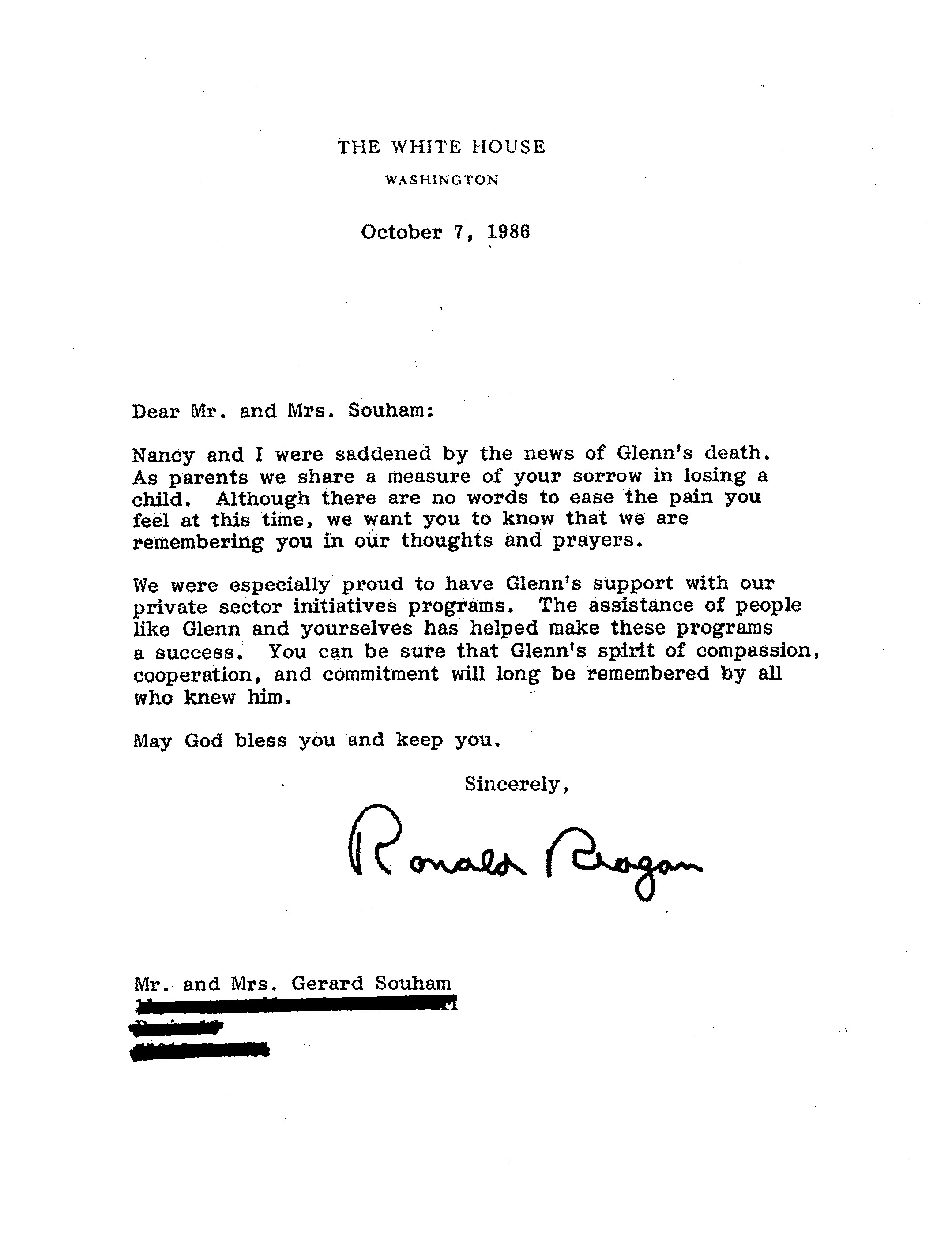
Letter from Pdt Ronald Reagan

== Interiors ==
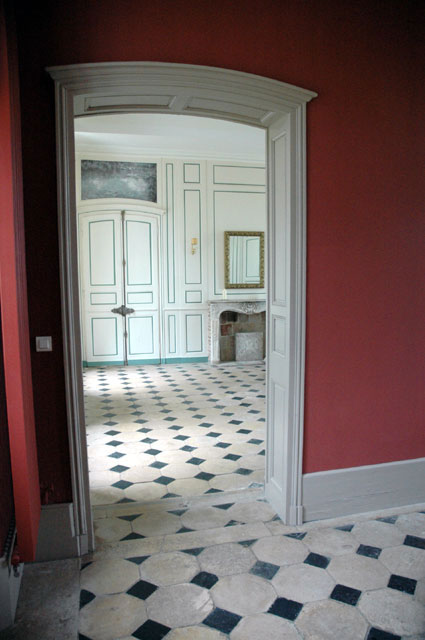
Main Hall

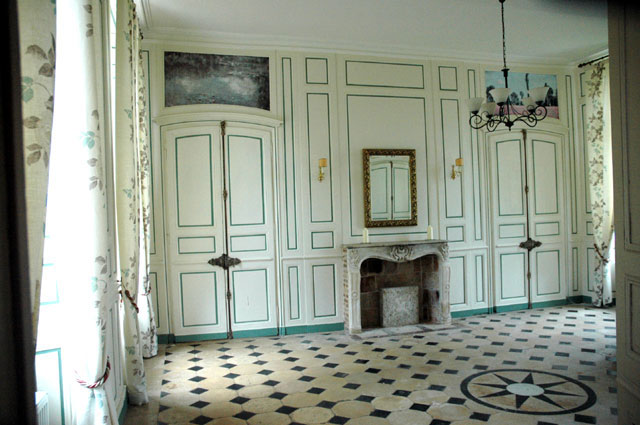
Dining

== Exterior ==
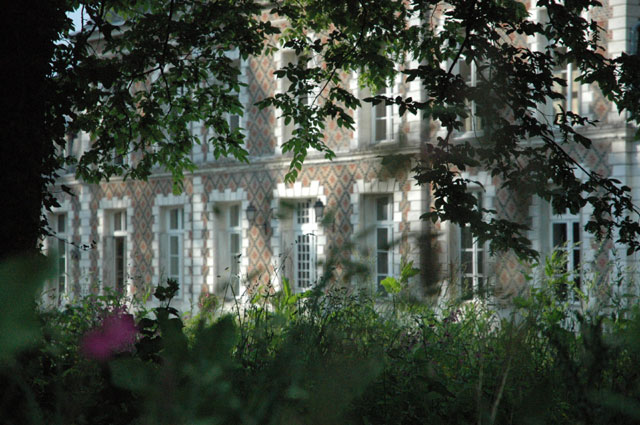
Garden
