= Bosc-Guérard-Saint-Adrien =

- Commune
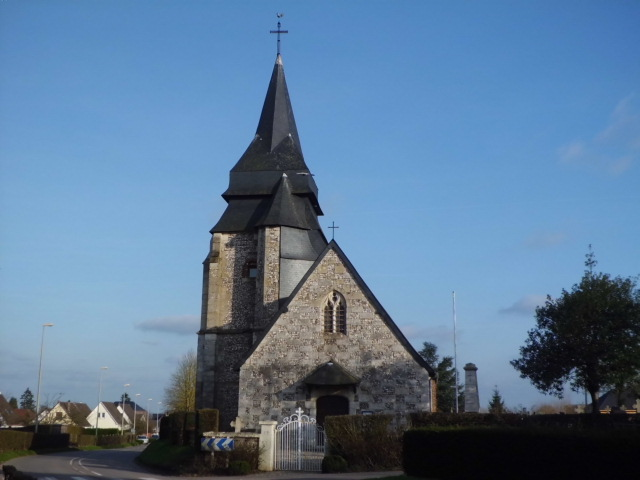
- The church in Bosc-Guérard

- Coat of arms
- Location of Bosc-Guérard-Saint-Adrien
- Location within France Location within Normandy
- Coordinates: 49°32′29″N 1°07′12″E
- Country: France
- Region: Normandy
- Department: Seine-Maritime
- Arrondissement: Rouen
- Canton: Bois-Guillaume

Government
  - Mayor (2026–32): Denis Gutierrez
- Area^{1}: 10.41 km^{2} (4.02 sq mi)
- Elevation: 171 m (561 ft)
- Highest elevation: 178 m (584 ft)
- Lowest elevation: 65 m (213 ft)
- Population (2023): 1,101
  - Density: 105.8/km^{2} (273.9/sq mi)
- Time zone: UTC+01:00 (CET)
  - Summer (DST): UTC+02:00 (CEST)
- INSEE/Postal code: 76123 /76710
- ^{1} French Land Register data, which excludes lakes, ponds, glaciers > 1 km^{2} (0.386 sq mi or 247 acres) and river estuaries.

Bosc-Guérard-Saint-Adrien is a commune in the Seine-Maritime department in the Normandy region in northern France.

== Geography ==
A farming village situated some 7 miles (11 km) north of Rouen at the junction of the D47 and the D3 roads.

== Population ==
Historical population
| Year | Pop. | ±% p.a. |
|---|---|---|
| 1968 | 342 | — |
| 1975 | 373 | +1.25% |
| 1982 | 431 | +2.09% |
| 1990 | 578 | +3.74% |
| 1999 | 776 | +3.33% |
| 2007 | 830 | +0.84% |
| 2012 | 890 | +1.41% |
| 2017 | 948 | +1.27% |
| 2023 | 1,101 | +2.53% |
Source: INSEE

== Places of interest ==
- The church of St.Pierre-et-Paul, dating from the thirteenth century.
- The seventeenth century Château du Bosc Théroulde, once owned by François de Montmorency.
- A fifteenth century manorhouse at Plessis, with a dovecote and chapel.
- The chapel of Saint-Adrien at Bosc-Théroulde, dating from the eighteenth century.

== See also ==
- Communes of the Seine-Maritime department
