= Jean-Pierre Dannaud =

Jean-Pierre Dannaud, (6 February 1921, Paris – 1995) was a French State Councillor and novelist who won the 1993 French Academy Prize for his novel Fleuve Rouge (Red River).

== Education ==
He received the degree of Associate of Philosophy from the Lycée Henri-IV in Paris, Ecole Normale Supérieure.

== Career ==
In 1947, he was professor at the Lycee Janson de Sailly in Paris, then in the 1948–1950 period he was appointed cultural attaché in Saigon. In 1950–1954, he became director of information services in French Indochina and then head of the French Cultural Mission in Vietnam (1954–1956). In 1957, he became cultural councillor, head of the French academic and cultural mission to Morocco and then technical adviser to the president of the community (1959).

During the 1961–1964 period he was appointed as director of cultural and technical cooperation in the Ministry of Cooperation and then director of cultural and technical cooperation secretary of state for foreign affairs (1964–1966). In 1966, he became a state councillor in France. From April 1967 to May 1968 he was chief of staff to the minister of the interior. He then became commissioner for tourism (1970–1974), returned to the Council of State (November 1974). He was the appointed director of the Havas Agency in 1972.

In 1972, he was appointed director of Agence Havas and then returned to the Council of State in 1974.

In 1993 he received the prize of the French Academy for his novel Fleuve rouge.

Jean-Pierre Dannaud died in Paris on December 7, 1995, at the age of 74.

== See also ==
- Château du Bosc Théroulde
- Benjamin Walker
