= Chandrajit Banerjee =

Indian businessman

- Born: 22 August 1962 (age 64)
- Education: University of Calcutta
- Occupation: Director General of the Confederation of Indian Industry

Chandrajit Banerjee is the Director General of the Confederation of Indian Industry (CII) and member of a number of government advisory bodies at national and international levels. As DG of CII, he is responsible for leading and contributing to many policy level dialogues and discussions to enhance the competitiveness of India Inc and towards the development of India.

He has been with the CII since 1987 and has served as its Director General since 2008. In this post, he is responsible for the overall operations of CII.

== Education ==
Chandrajit Banerjee is a post-graduate in economics with specialisation in economics of planning and econometrics from the University of Calcutta. Earlier, he did his schooling from the Calcutta Boys' School and then his graduation from St. Xavier's College, Kolkata in Economics (Hons).

He has been honoured with Honorary Doctorate (D. Phil Honoris Causa) from Amity University and Honorary Doctorate in Business Management from the Xavier Institute of Management (Xavier University), Bhubaneswar.

== Career ==
Prior to his appointment as Director General of CII, he held several senior positions in key areas including sectoral verticals of Manufacturing, Services, Agriculture and Life Sciences as well as the SME sector. He has also led CII’s policy work relating to macroeconomic policy, financial services and corporate governance. He was also in charge of CII’s regional operations.

He was also the first executive director of the National Foundation of Corporate Governance (NFCG), an organisation set up by the Ministry of Corporate Affairs, Government of India.

Banerjee is member of various government advisory committees. He is the vice chairman of the Asia Pacific Chapter of UFI, a global association of the exhibition industry. He is the Co-chairman of the Governing Council. He was also the co-chairman of Overseas Indian Facilitation Centre (OIFC), a not-for-profit public private initiative of Ministry of Overseas Indian Affairs (MOIA) and CII, established in 2007. He is a Member of the World Economic Forum's Global Agenda Council on India. Banerjee is also a member of the Advisory Council to the Chief Minister of Madhya Pradesh and also a member of the Board of Governors of Indian Institute of Management Ranchi. He is in the Board of Trustees and Governing Council of National Foundation for Corporate Governance (NFCG) as a Member.

He holds / has held Trusteeship and Board Member posts in many global and Indian institutions which includes Institute of Economic Growth (IEG); Global Innovation and Technology Alliance (GITA); Bharatiya Yuva Shakti Trust (BYST); Society of Indian Defence Manufacturers (SIDM); World Economic Forum (WEF); Global Agenda Council of India; Commonwealth Enterprise and Investment Council (CWEIC); Indian Institute of Management (IIM), etc. He is also a Member of the Managing Committee of SPORTSCOM and Governing Council Member of some Sector Skill Councils. CII Foundation and India@75 Foundation, which are promoted and supported by CII, are also two institutions where CB is a Board level member.

He is a Director on the Board at the ‘Invest India’ which is set up by the Department of Promotion of Industry and Internal Trade, Ministry of Commerce and Industry, Government of India.

Chandrajit Banerjee is also a Director of the Singapore India Partnership Foundation (SIPF).

He is also Secretary for many bilateral CEOs Forums constituted by the Government of India like Australia, France, Malaysia, Indonesia, Japan, Sweden, South Africa, etc.

== Awards ==
Chandrajit Banerjee has been awarded the China-India Friendship Award by the Chinese prime minister Wen Jiabao for his contributions towards the development of bilateral ties between India and China. He has also been conferred with the decoration of Knight Commander of the Order of Queen Isabella by Felipe VI, the king of Spain for his contribution towards promoting relations between India and Spain.

Government of Italy has bestowed CB with the award of “Cavaliere dell’Ordine della Stella d’Italia” for collaborating and solidifying friendly relationship and cooperation between Italy and India.
