= Confederation of Indian Industry =

Industry association in India

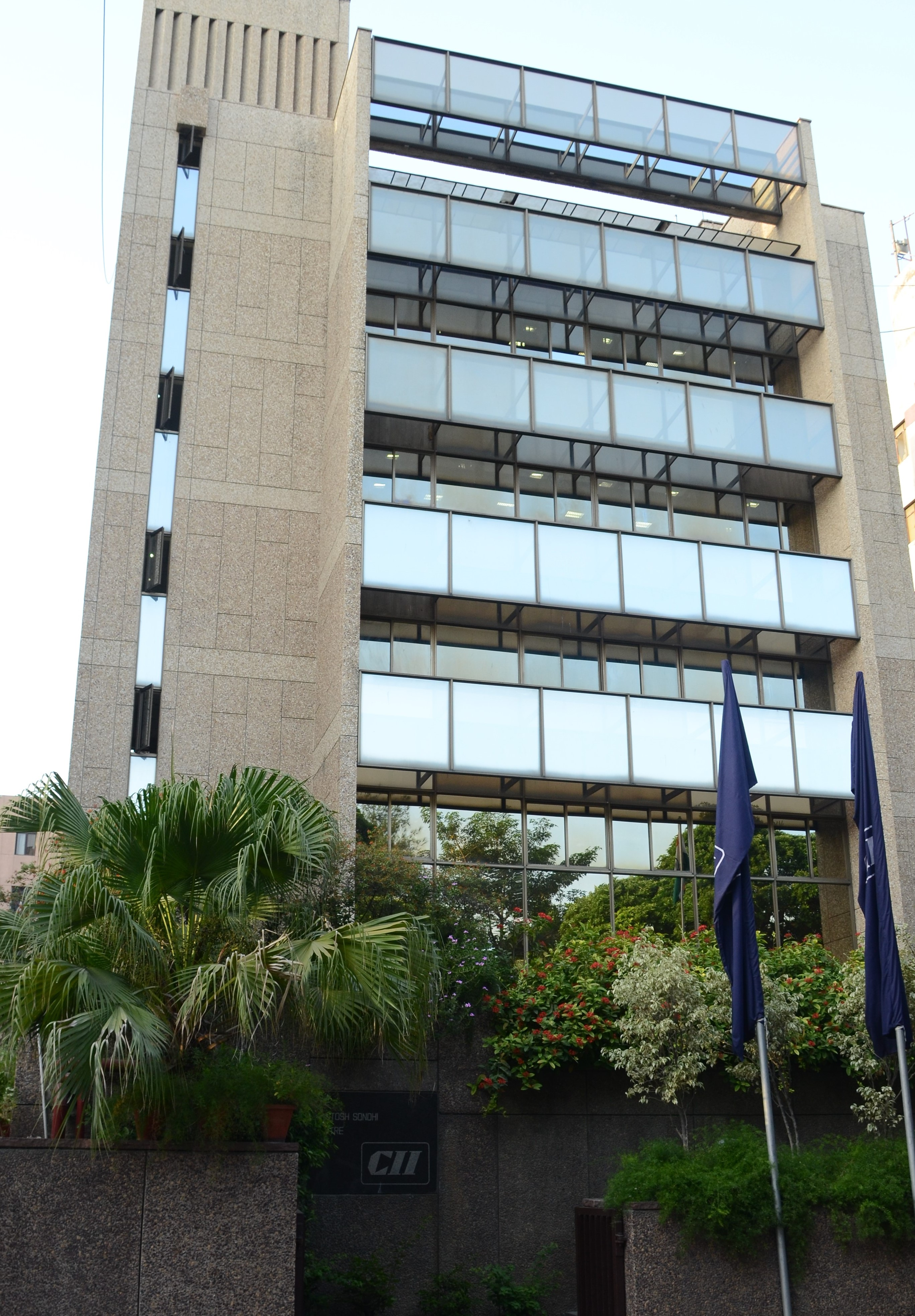
- CII's headquarters in New Delhi
- Abbreviation: CII
- Predecessor: Confederation of Engineering Industry
- Formation: 1895; 131 years ago
- Type: Non-governmental trade association
- Headquarters: New Delhi, India
- Coordinates: 28°35′09.5″N 77°13′36.0″E
- Region served: Worldwide
- Services: Business promotion, networking, policy reforms
- Members: Direct 9,000+ Indirect 3,00,000
- President: R Mukundan
- Director General: Chandrajit Banerjee
- Website: cii.in

The Confederation of Indian Industry (CII) is a non-governmental business and industry organisation and advocacy group headquartered in New Delhi, India, founded in 1895. CII is a membership-based organisation with over 9,700 direct members and 3,65,000 indirect members from 318 national and regional industry bodies.

Originally established in 1895 as the Engineering and Iron Trades Association (EITA), the organisation underwent several transformations before becoming CII in 1991. It played a significant role in India's economic liberalisation reforms of 1991 and was appointed as the B20 India Secretariat during India's G20 Presidency in 2023.

CII has 70 offices across India, including 12 Centres of Excellence in areas such as quality, sustainability, and manufacturing. Internationally, it operates 9 overseas offices and engages with governments, industry associations, and multilateral institutions worldwide. The organisation also runs social initiatives including Young Indians, Indian Women Network, and the India@100 Foundation.

CII was appointed as the B20 India Secretariat by the Government of India to lead the B20 India process during India's G20 Presidency in 2023.

== History ==
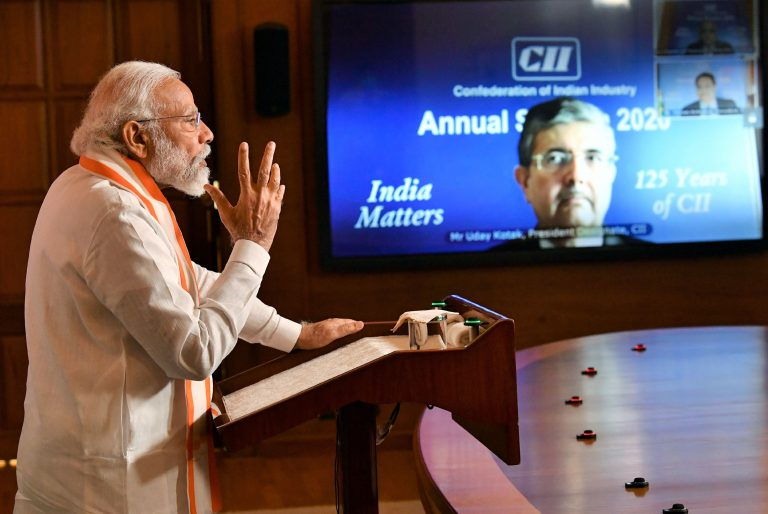
Prime minister Shri Narendra Modi addressing the inaugural session of the virtual CII Annual Session 2020 with the theme 'Getting Growth Back' on 2 June 2020.

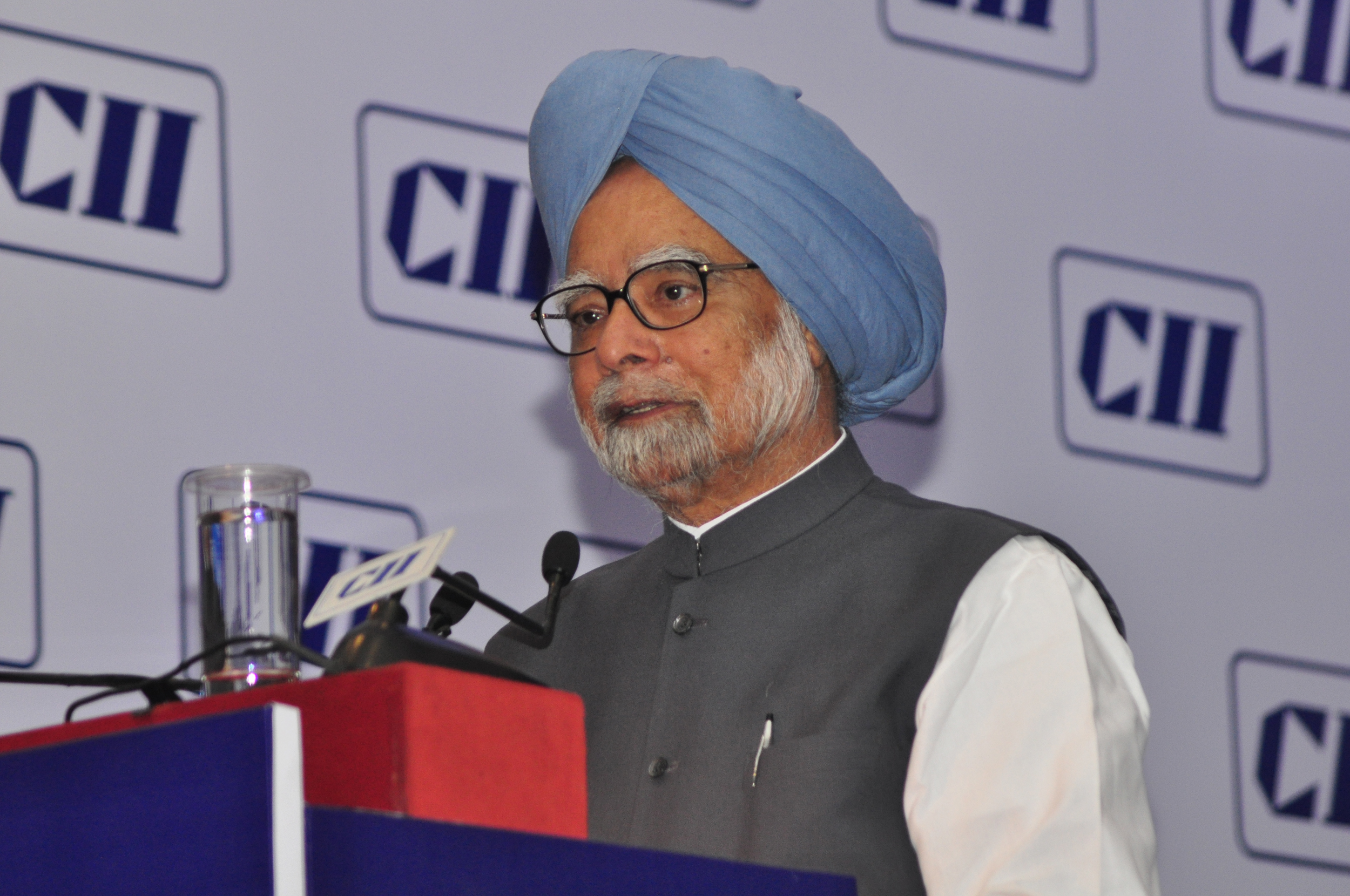
Manmohan Singh, Prime Minister of India, addressing the CII Annual Session 2007

The journey of CII began in 1895, when 5 engineering firms – Martin & Company, Burn & Company, John King & Company, Jessop & Company, and Turner Morrison & Company – decided to form the Engineering and Iron Trades Association (EITA). To promote the interests of Indian manufacturers, EITA was renamed as Indian Engineering Association (IEA) in 1912. In 1942, the Engineering Association of India (EAI) was founded to promote the interests of small and medium engineering firms. In 1974, EAI merged with IEA and formed the Association of Indian Engineering Industry (AIEI) which in 1986 became the Confederation of Engineering Industry (CEI). The CEI in 1991, became the present Confederation of Indian Industry (CII).

During the 1980s, the Association of Indian Engineering Industry (AIEI) was galvanised into the Confederation of Indian Industry – a national organisation that would represent the interests of Indian industry.

In 1998, the then Prime Minister Atal Bihari Vajpayee while addressing CII's National Conference & Annual Session urged to reform the government, industry and the common citizen. This was his first address to any industry association as the Prime Minister. Vajpayee reaffirmed the government's commitment to reforms and underscored the importance of sustainable economic growth.

In 2007, the then Indian Prime Minister Manmohan Singh at CII Annual Session, invited corporate India to be a partner in making a more humane and just society where he emphasised a Ten-Point Social Charter for inclusive growth.

In 2020, Indian Prime Minister Narendra Modi gave the plenary speech at CII's 125th Annual Session. He focused on building an Atmanirbhar Bharat (self-reliant India) and bringing India back on the path of rapid development.

The Prime Minister has subsequently addressed several CII occasions, including the post-Budget interaction on 30 July 2024, soon after assuming charge for the third consecutive term.

== Organisation ==
CII is a body registered under Societies Registration Act, 1860 of India. The highest governing body of CII is the CII National Council, composed of leading industry heads and experts.

=== Leadership ===
For 2026–2027, R Mukundan, Managing Director & CEO, Tata Chemicals Ltd is the President of CII, Dr Suchitra K Ella, Co-founder and Managing Director, Bharat Biotech International Limited, is the President-Designate of CII and Shashwat Goenka, Vice Chairman, RP-Sanjiv Goenka Group, is the Vice President of CII. Chandrajit Banerjee is the Director General of CII since May 2008.

Rajiv Memani, Chairman and CEO, EY India was the president of CII for the year 2025-2026. Sanjiv Puri, Chairman and Managing Director, ITC Limited, was the President of CII for the year 2024-25. R Dinesh, Executive Vice Chairman, TVS Supply Chain Solutions Ltd was the President of CII for the year 2023-24. Sanjiv Bajaj, Chairman and Managing Director of Bajaj Finserv Limited was the President of CII for the year 2022–2023. T. V. Narendran , CEO and Managing Director of Tata Steel Limited, was the President, CII for the year 2021–2022.

=== Membership ===
CII has direct membership of around 9700 members from the private as well as public sectors, including SMEs and MNCs, and an indirect membership of over 3,65,000 enterprises, from 318 national and regional industry bodies.

== Activities ==
=== Policy advocacy ===
CII has over 600 'Intellectual Groups' – councils, committees, task forces, and working groups among others – working at the national and regional levels, across industry sectors. These groups give shape to and articulate member concerns to government policymakers, regulators, think tanks etc. They work pro-actively with the government to formulate policies that would empower businesses.

CII has been a catalyst of change in India's economic policy reforms. CII played a very important role during economic liberalisation in 1991 which knocked down the high walls of protection between Indian industry and the rest of the world.

CII actively engages with central and state governments at various levels on issues facing Indian industry and society and recommends policies conducive to the development of India.

To stimulate foreign investment into India and engage with overseas businesses, CII engages with overseas government leaders, businesses and industry associations. It has partnered on Indian government initiatives in other countries and organizes business meetings in India with regions and partner countries to expand Indian industry's overseas footprint.

=== Competitiveness ===
CII has set up dedicated Centers of Excellence to enhance the competitiveness of Indian industry through training, consultancy, and research. These centres provide special services to the industry to enable firms to lower their costs and become more productive and competitive. Currently, there are 12 Centers of Excellence set up in the areas of Quality, Green Business, Manufacturing Excellence, Logistics, SMEs, Sustainable Development, Leadership, Food and Agriculture, and Water Institute, Innovation, Entrepreneurship and Start-ups, Employment and Livelihood, and Skills.

==== Quality movement ====
India started its quality movement journey in the early 1980s. Late Japanese Professor Kaoru Ishikawa visited India in 1986, then heading JUSE (Union of Japanese Scientists and Engineers). During his visit to India, he recommended starting a national drive for quality by setting up an institutional arrangement. CII took the lead in this initiative and has since spearheaded the quality movement in India. In 1988, A Total Quality Management Division (TQMD) was set up on Ishikawa's recommendation. The TQMD evolved into the CII Institute of Quality, which led a quality movement that aimed to transform Indian businesses by offering them Total Quality Management skills such as Total Productive Maintenance, Lean Management, Six Sigma, Industrial and Legal Metrology, and Conformity Assessment and Standards. CII and the Export-Import Bank of India jointly established the CII-EXIM Bank Award for Business Excellence in 1994. The Award is based on the internationally recognised EFQM Excellence Model. The CII Institute of quality has had a major impact on a large number of firms in India in terms of raising overall awareness regarding quality.

==== Environment ====
CII initiated industry engagement in the area of environment and climate change in 1991, when the landmark Rio Summit was held. Since then, it has established four Centres of Excellence that work in the areas of climate change, air pollution, environment, sustainability, green building, energy, agriculture and water management.

==== Green buildings ====
Going green way addresses ecological challenges and also makes good business sense. Keeping this principle in mind, the CII Green Business Centre (GBC) was launched in March 2000 during the visit of the then U.S. President Bill Clinton to India. The Centre aims to promote ecologically sustainable business models in green economy. The GBC was inaugurated by Dr. A. P. J. Abdul Kalam, the then President of India on 14 July 2004. The GBC headquarters at Hyderabad is India's first platinum rated green building which has been awarded by the United States Green Building Council (USGBC), under the Leadership in Energy and Environmental Design (LEED) rating system.

Since 2004, the GBC under the aegis of Indian Green Building Council (IGBC) is spearheading the green movement in the country by offering services to various national and international stakeholders in the areas of green projects.

In 2011, the centre launched the GreenCo Rating system which evaluates how green a company is and suggests the way forward on resource conservation as well as energy and environmental management. In 2015, GreenCo Rating was acknowledged in India's Intended Nationally Determined Contribution (INDC) document, submitted to United Nations Framework Convention on Climate Change (UNFCCC), as a proactive voluntary action of Indian industry towards combating climate change.

So far, 22 green building rating systems have been designed by GBC to address ecological challenges. IGBC Green Building Rating System has adopted over 5,400 green building projects amounting to over 7.5 billion sq. ft. GBC's various initiatives have facilitated the reduction of over 16 million tons of CO_{2} per year.

The CII Centre at Indore offers the services of several centres of excellence at one place to provide comprehensive guidance to enterprises at the grassroots.

=== International partnership ===
International activities include meeting with the Heads of State and Government, decision-makers, networking with counterpart organisations, multilateral and academic institutions, and other policy-making bodies.

CII's international engagement journey started with the opening of its first overseas office in 1977 in Dammam, Saudi Arabia. This endeavour helped to place the organisation on a high pedestal of relationship with the government, diplomatic missions, and international agencies. AIEI organised the very first international trade mission to Africa in 1975, covering Kenya, Zambia, Egypt, and Libya. In 1976, a Mission went to Iran, Iraq, and Kuwait. These initiatives of AIEI helped explore business opportunities in African and middle-east markets.

From 2013, CII has broadened its focus of work through more Regional and Country Committees like: Africa, ASEAN + ANZ, East Europe, GCC, LAC, Bangladesh, Canada, China, Germany, Italy, Japan, Maldives, Nepal, Pakistan, Russia, South Korea and Sri Lanka. CII's International work is backed by 9 overseas offices in Australia, China, Egypt, Germany, Indonesia, Singapore, UAE, UK, and the US that helps propagate important information pertaining to markets and joint venture possibilities to both Indian and global companies.

CII was appointed as the B20 Secretariat by the Government of India to lead the B20 India process during India's G20 Presidency in 2023. It organized the successful B20 India Summit in August 2023 and brought out key thought pieces for the global business community.

=== Community development ===
In the year 2000, CII set up the Indian Business Trust for HIV/AIDS to engage the industry in meeting the challenges of the deadly virus. This Trust helped formulate ISO 9002 workplace policy and protocols for industry. More than 2000 companies in India joined this campaign to provide a safe and healthy work environment for their employees.

During the COVID-19 pandemic, CII extended its support to a large number of affected people to mitigate the global crisis. Synergizing the efforts of Indian industry and engaging with the Government of India, CII reached out to various sections of the society, providing immediate relief and strategic long-term rehabilitation support.

To tackle the unexpected and immense challenge posed by the COVID-19 pandemic, CII formed a high-level task force to find possible solutions to issues faced by Indian industry. CII made immediate policy interventions and representations at both the state and central government levels for macroeconomic management, monetary measures, and ease of doing business. It came out with an impact assessment on industry and economy with an exit strategy to sustain continuity.

CII is working on air pollution in North India, Anganwadi development, disaster management and relief and education, among other areas. It has also instituted the Women Exemplar Awards to recognize women leaders making a difference at the grassroots.

== Initiatives ==
CII has undertaken various initiatives: India@75, Young Indians, and Indian Women Network.

=== India@75 and India@100 ===
India@75 is a CII initiative that envisions how India should be in 2022 – the 75th year of India's independence. The idea of India@75 was conceptualised at the Incredible India@60 celebrations in New York in 2007, where Professor C.K. Prahalad, management professor at the University of Michigan, shared his vision of India@75.

CII adopted his vision of India@75 on 8 May 2008. After consultations, a national vision document - India@75 – The People's Agenda was released. It was structured around the ten broad themes - Education & Skill Development, Technology & Innovation, Agriculture, Businesses, Infrastructure & Urbanization, Health, Environment, Arts, Sports & Literature, Governance & Public Administration and Moral Leadership.

To turn this vision into reality, CII set up the India@75 Foundation. This initiative of CII has also found resonance with the Government of India, as in the Strategy for New India@75 document released by the NITI Aayog in 2018.

The India@75 Foundation has now been renamed as the India@100 Foundation which is working towards Vikit Bharat@100.

The CII Annual Meeting 2021 was organised on 11–12 August 2021 on the theme- "India@75: Government and Business working together for Aatmanirbhar Bharat." Shri Narendra Modi, Hon'ble Prime Minister of India, was the Chief Guest and delivered the inaugural address.

=== Young Indians ===
CII set up Young Indians (YI) in 2002 to engage youth leaders in nation building. YI is one of the founding members of the G20 Young Entrepreneur's Alliance (G20 YEA) and Commonwealth Alliance of Young Entrepreneurs – Asia Pacific (CAYE-A). Through MASOOM, Gift an Organ and Road Safety projects, the organisation connects youth in development work. It's student wing YUVA engages with students through 130 institutions in India. YI has participated in disaster relief operations and health emergencies such as COVID-19. Young Indians has 3,600 members across its 51 offices, and 29,500 students YUVA members from colleges in India.

=== Indian Women Network ===
CII launched Indian Women Network (IWN) in 2013 to develop women workforce and work towards challenges faced by them at the workplace. Through CII's National Committee on Women Empowerment, IWN engages with the government, industry and thought leaders to shape inclusive policy for women workforce. IWN has developed an online Gender Diagnostic Tool for companies to self-assess and identify strengths, gaps and opportunities to improve gender parity and develop their potential. It has also initiated Equal Opportunity Pledge for companies to ensure inclusive work environment for women.

=== National Foundation for Corporate Governance ===
To promote voluntary, transparent and accountable corporate governance practices in India, Ministry of Corporate Affairs set up National Foundation for Corporate Governance (NFCG) as a Trust in the year 2003. It was set up in partnership with CII, Institute of Company Secretaries of India (ICSI) and Institute of Chartered Accountants of India (ICAI). In the year 2010, Institute of Cost Accountants of India (ICAI) and National Stock Exchange (NSE) were included in NFCG as Trustees and in 2013 Indian Institute of Corporate Affairs (IICA) also joined as Trustee.

=== Indian Digital Gaming Society ===
In 2018, the CII formed the Indian Digital Gaming Society (IDGS) to foster the development of an Indian video game development industry. They have hosted an annual meeting, the IDGS Gaming Conclave, for industry professionals and lobby for increased government funding of their sector. The IDGS wants to make video games a central component of India's digital economy. In response to the Promotion and Regulation of Online Gaming Act, 2025, the IDGS predicted that India's gaming market would become more focused on microtransactions and in-app purchases.
