= Joint Cipher Bureau =

Division of the Indian armed forces

The Joint Cipher Bureau (JCB) is an agency of the Indian armed forces responsible for signals intelligence and cryptanalysis and coordinating similar activities and operations of military intelligence agencies. It is under the Ministry of Defence and its employees are all civilian like Military Engineer Services (India) mostly attached to defence organization.

The JCB works closely with the IB and R&AW. It is responsible for cryptanalysis and encryption of sensitive data. The inter-services JCB has primary responsibility for cryptology and SIGINT, providing coordination and direction to the other military service organizations with similar mission. Most current equipment providing tactical intelligence is of Russian origin, including specialized direction finding and monitoring equipment. The JCB also analysis and participates in investigations of any personnel of the Defence Research and Development Organization (DRDO) if incriminating material is discovered during inspections by the DRDO's security.

The JCB is also responsible for issues relating to public and private key management. Cryptographic products are export-controlled licensed items, and licenses to India are not generally available for products of key length of more than 56 bits. The domestic Indian computer industry primarily produces PCs, and PC-compatible cryptographic products have been developed and are being used commercially. More robust cryptologic systems are not commercially produced in India, and progress in this field has been slow due to the general unavailability of technology and know-how. Customised cryptographic products have been designed and produced by organizations in the defence sector are engaged in the implementation of cryptographic techniques, protocols and the products.

== Ranks and Hierarchy ==
Ranks are divided into two groups

=== Group-A ===
1. Director
2. Joint Director
3. Deputy Director
4. Senior Systems Security Officer-I
5. Senior Systems Security Officer-I I

=== Group- B ===
1. System Security Officer
2. Senior Technical Assistant
3. Technical Assistant
4. Programmer
5. Junior Programmer
6. Data Processing Assistant
