= Ashok Som =

Professor at ESSEC Business School

Ashok Som is a professor at ESSEC Business School (France-Singapore), specializing in research on the luxury sector. He founded the Indian Research Center, which focuses on studying the impact of Indian and Asian businesses on French and European markets.

In addition to his research contributions, Som was the founding Associate Dean of the Global MBA Program at ESSEC Business School. He also serves as the coordinator of the executive program in Luxury and Retail Management at the Indian Institute of Management Ahmedabad.

== Books ==
He has authored several books on trends in the luxury industry, international strategy, and organizational redesign:

- Organization Re-design and Innovative HRM (Oxford University Press, 2008).
- International Management: Managing the Global Corporation (McGraw Hill, 2009).
- The Road to Luxury: The Evolution, Markets and Strategies of Luxury Brand Management (John Wiley & Sons, 2015).
